= North Dublin Pirates =

American Football team in Ireland

- Established: 2015
- Based in: Swords, County Dublin
- Home stadium: Malahide Rugby Club
- League: IAFL
- Division: IAFL-2 (as of 2022)

Current uniform
Home kit

Away kit

North Dublin Pirates are an American football club, founded in 2015, based in the North County Dublin area of Fingal primarily the large suburban town of Swords. As of 2022, the club was playing in the IAFL affiliated IAFL2 division, the third tier of the American Football League system in Ireland. In January 2024, a post on the club's Facebook profile stated that it would not be "fielding a team for [the] 2024 season".

== History ==
North Dublin Pirates were formed, in August 2015, when two former Drogheda Lightning players decided to start a new club after the demise of their former club.

It was decided the club would set up in the North County Dublin area. It was decided the new team would be called the North Dublin Pirates and the new team would apply for a place in the bottom tier of American football in Ireland IAFL2. The newly formed club gathered a number of players from the Swords and Fingal areas, running training at the public park Newbridge House just outside Swords.

With a squad assembled by late 2015, the club applied for a place in IAFL2 and was granted entry for the 2016 season.

In early 2016, the club moved its training base to Donaghmede Park in Donaghmede. The Pirates inaugural season was in 2016.

As of 2017, the North Dublin Pirates were playing their home games at Malahide Rugby Club, on the Estuary Road outside Swords.

=== Inaugural (2016) season ===
The North Dublin Pirates played in their first ever game away to the newly formed Wexford Eagles in Gorey. The Pirates, with a small squad of only 16 players, played against a larger Eagles squad and ended up on the end of a 34–8 scoreline. The game had to be called near the middle of the 4th quarter due to a number of injuries to the already decimated Pirates squad. Team Ireland international player Oisin Dowling scored the very first touchdown in the club's history.

In their next match, the Pirates played their first home game at Malahide Rugby Club against the Galway Warriors. The Warriors won the game by 29–6.

In the Pirates 3rd game, they played at home against the Derry/Donegal Vipers. The Vipers were a new team that first played in the 2015 IAFL2. The game took up to moniker of the 'Banter Bowl' due the lighthearted verbal jousting on the two teams' respective social media pages. The Pirates lost to the Vipers by 26–6.

In the fourth game of the season, the Pirates traveled to Lisburn, County Antrim in Northern Ireland to play against fellow newcomers the PSNI Razorbacks - a team representing the police force of Northern Ireland. The game, which was played in wet conditions, finished 6–0 to the Pirates and resulted in the club's very first victory.

In the fifth and final home game of the season, the Pirates were defeated by 40–7 by the Wexford Eagles.

In the final game of the season, the Pirates made the journey to face the unbeaten Donegal/Derry Vipers in Drumahoe. The Pirates lost to the Vipers by 44–0.
