= Dalymount Park =

Football stadium in Dublin, Ireland

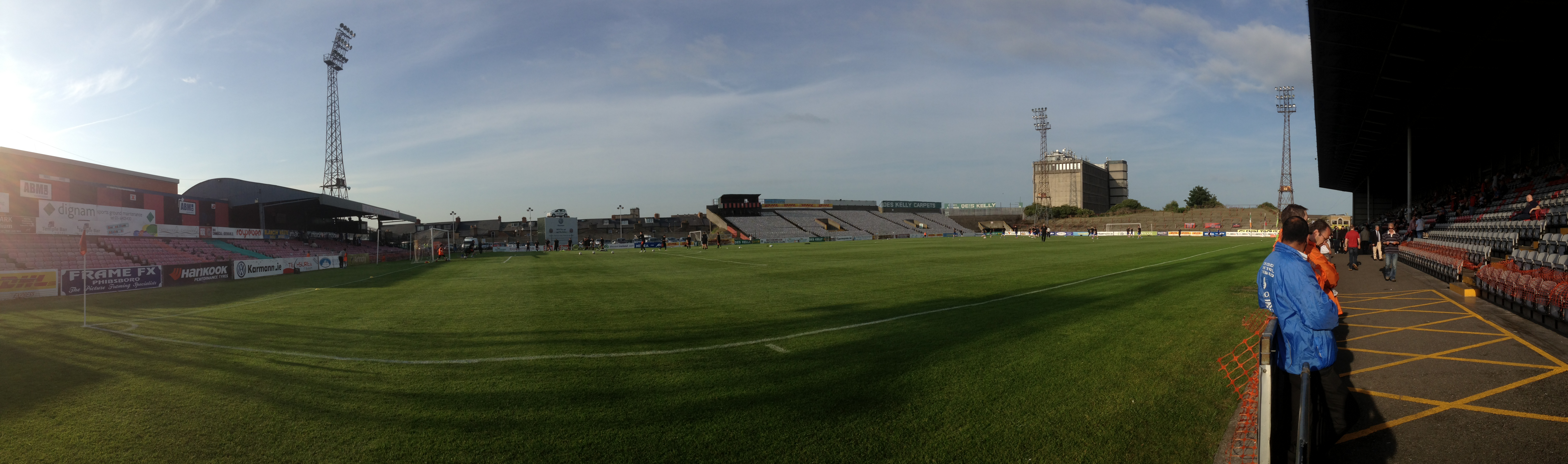

- Location within Dublin
- Location: Phibsborough, Dublin, Ireland
- Coordinates: 53°21′42″N 6°16′30″W
- Owner: Dublin City Council
- Capacity: 4,500
- Surface: Grass
- Scoreboard: No
- Field size: 125 x 75yds
- Public transit: Cabra; Phibsborough; Dublin Bus routes E1 & E2

Construction
- Groundbreaking: 1901
- Opened: 7 September 1901; 125 years ago
- Renovated: 1928, 1999, 2023

Tenants
- Bohemian F.C. (1901–present); Bohemian F.C. Women (2022–present); Republic of Ireland national football team (1954–1990); Shamrock Rovers F.C. (1988–1990)

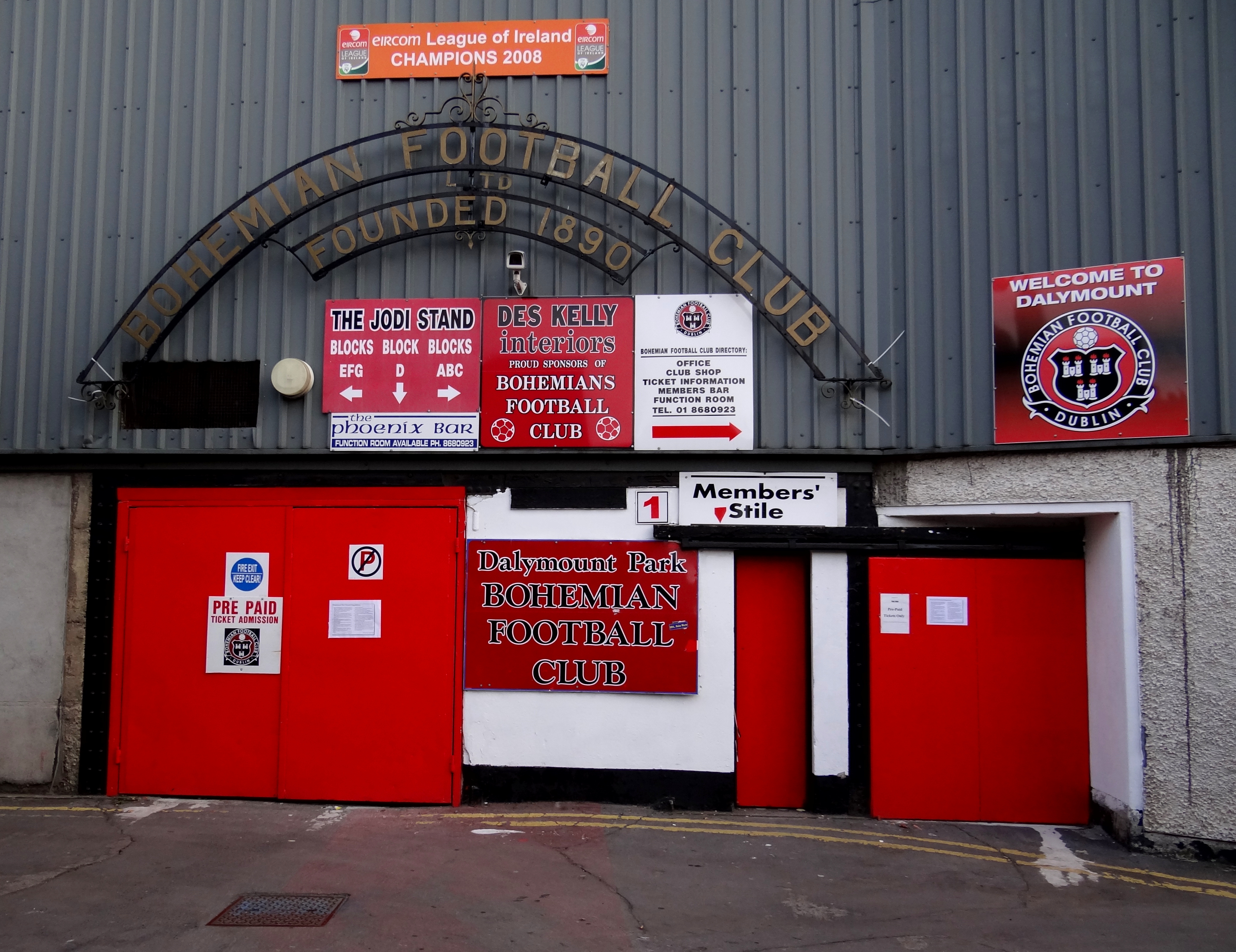
Entrance gate to Dalymount Park

Dalymount Park (Irish: Páirc Chnocán Uí Dhálaigh) is a football stadium located in Phibsborough on the Northside of Dublin, Ireland. It is the home of Bohemian F.C., who have played there since the early 20th century, and has a capacity of 4,443.

Affectionately known as Dalyer by fans, it was also historically the "home of Irish football", holding many Irish internationals and FAI Cup finals. It has also hosted UEFA Champions League qualifiers, UEFA Cup and UEFA Cup Winners' Cup matches. However, the ground was largely undeveloped between the 1940s and the 2000s, and has now fallen out of use as a major venue, except for the home games of Bohemians.

The ground has also been used as a home ground by other League of Ireland teams, including Shelbourne, Shamrock Rovers, Dublin City F.C., and Sporting Fingal. Although it was also proposed in 2016 that Shelbourne F.C. would share the ground, by 2025 Shelbourne had secured a long-term lease to remain at Tolka Park.

== History ==
=== Early years ===
Dalymount Park was originally common land with a large vegetable plot that was known as Pisser Dignam's Field until it was taken over by Bohemian F.C. The ground hosted its first game on 7 September 1901, between Bohemians and Shelbourne F.C. and in front of an attendance of around 3,000. Harold Sloan scored the first-ever goal at Dalymount Park in a 4–2 win for Bohs. On that day, it was just an ordinary field enclosed by a corrugated iron fence, the playing pitch being separated from the spectators by a roped barrier and a tent at one end served as dressing rooms for the players.

Within a few weeks, paling had replaced the ropes and the line of demarcation between "reserved" and "unreserved" was fixed by a 6 ft high hoarding. An "unreserved" entrance was then erected at the Connaught Street side. A small wooden stand to the east of the reserved entrance soon appeared as did a similar stand behind each goal.

Dalymount was chosen as the venue for the Irish Cup final in 1903, played on 14 March between Bohemians and Distillery with 6,000 in attendance. On 26 March 1904, the ground hosted an international game for the first time; the 1903–04 Home Championship match between Ireland and Scotland that ended in a 1–1 draw. Between 1904 and 1913, Dalymount hosted at least one Irish international in the years when Ireland had more than one home match in the British Home Championship.

By the 1907/08 season, the ground had been considerably widened, large wooden stands were erected behind both goals, another was built in the centre of the "popular" side and in the reserved enclosure an additional wooden stand appeared to the west of the entrance. Over the following years, the main stand on the reserved side was roofed and a similar addition made on the unreserved side.

In 1915, Dalymount hosted the IFA Intermediate Cup final when UCD beat Portadown 2–1.

Huge improvements happened to the ground during the 1927/28 season; the galvanised iron boundary was replaced by a 10 ft wall having 20 turnstile houses and entrance and exit gates at a cost of £2,520. A new steel stand was erected in the reserved enclosure and provision was made for fitting out club rooms, offices, etc. when more money was available. Entrance to the stand was by steps placed at points along the front and facing the field of play. This stand cost £5,833. Other additions included an iron railing along the pitch on the reserved side, new banking on both reserved and unreserved sides and a gymnasium and kicking alley.

A terraced stand at the Tramway End of the stadium was built behind the eastern goal in 1928, so called because of a tram depot located behind that side of the ground.

Within a few years, the Bohemian F.C. committee engaged the services of famous Scottish architect Archibald Leitch (he had designed many of the most famous grounds in England and Scotland) who drew up plans for the future building of Dalyer. Another section was added to the reserved stand, and new entrances and exits were placed at the rear. More banking and terracing around the entire pitch were completed, crush barriers erected and new-style houses installed (bringing the total to 28). This new work meant that between 1925/26 and 1932, a total of £17,000 had been spent on upgrading the stadium.

=== "Glory years" ===
In its heyday, Dalymount Park, or "Dalyer" as it is popularly known, regularly saw crowds of up to 40,000 for big games, however, whether it was ever able to accommodate this number of spectators safely is open to question. The stadium consisted of three sides of open terracing, one side the "Shed End" or "School End" being partly covered with a roof over half the terrace since 1945. The fourth side was the main stand, which held only 1,500 seats. The stand was constructed in 1928 from iron and wood, with wooden benches and a terraced standing room at the front. The floodlights that adorn Dalymount Park, once thought to have stood at Arsenal's old stadium, were in fact built in Scotland. The lights were funded through what we would now refer to as crowdfunding and inviting some of the bigger teams over. Initial notices suggested that the lights would be in place by September 1961, which was then extended to October and ultimately until February 1962. In the words of Club Secretary Andy Kettle, as quoted by Ryan Clarke in his recent series on Dalymount, it also meant that Bohs could "invite many top clubs to Dublin from time to time".

The first of which ended up being Arsenal, though they weren't the first choice. But before these glamour matches could be paid Kettle had to deal with some level of internal dissent from Bohs members about the level of expenditure and even had to engage in a little bit of what might be termed "crowdfunding" in the modern parlance. Kettle elaborated in the Dublin Evening Mail that the club had "approached their bankers, the Munster and Leinster Bank, their members, players, traders, FAI and League of Ireland for financial assistance", before adding "Bohs are keeping open their fund and will only be to happy to receive any further contributions. No matter how small…"The inaugural floodlit match saw Arsenal beat Bohemians 3-8.

Dalymount's record attendance was set during an Irish international game, the 1958 World Cup qualifier match against England, on 19 May 1957. The total figure was estimated to be between 45,000 and 48,000. A similar crowd attended the first entry of an Irish team into the European Cup, when Shamrock Rovers played Manchester United in September 1957. The record attendance at the venue for an FAI Cup final is 45,000, achieved when Shamrock Rovers beat Bohs in 1945. The ground saw the international debuts of players such as Liam Brady, Johnny Giles and Denis Irwin.

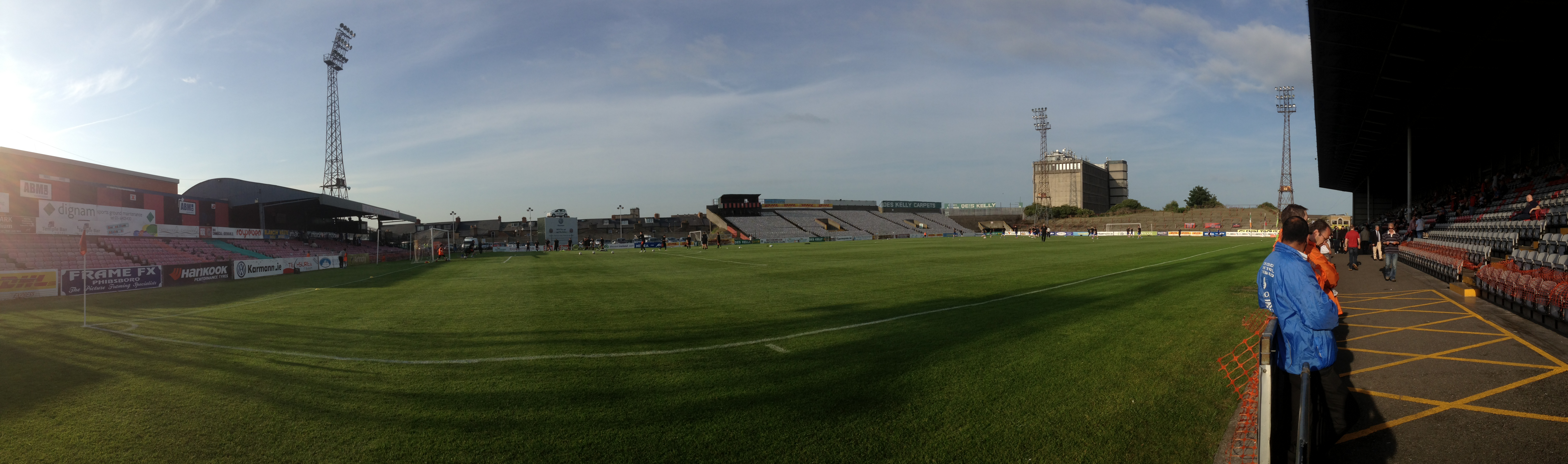
Panoramic view inside Dalymount Park in 2013

=== Record Breaking Hat-Trick ===
On 19 November 1967, with Shelbourne losing 0–2 to Bohemians in a League of Ireland match, Jimmy O'Connor scored a hat-trick within 2 minutes and 13 seconds as Shels came back to win 3–2 at Dalymount. O'Connor's goals won Shelbourne the game and set a record in Europe for the fastest ever officially verified hat-trick in a top-flight domestic league match which, as of November 2017, still stands.

=== Decline ===
The stadium hosted the Republic of Ireland team on 16 November 1983 for the international side's record 8–0 win over Malta. However, by the 1980s, Dalymount had been sidelined by the more modern and larger Lansdowne Road rugby union ground for Irish football internationals. Parts of the ground had also become somewhat dilapidated, some of the terracing was in bad shape – with grass growing on it in places – and one access route to the ground (behind the old "Tramway End") had been cut off completely. In February 1985, when Ireland played the then World Champions, Italy, at Dalymount Park, it was clear that the old ground could not accommodate the 40,000 or so spectators who turned up to see the game. Fans had to be passed down to the sidelines to avoid being crushed and serious questions were raised about whether Dalymount was a viable venue for modern sport. After a safety review, the capacity of the stadium was cut in half to only 22,000. Thereafter, Dalymount only rarely hosted senior internationals and rarer still competitive ones. The last full Irish international game to be played there was a friendly against Morocco in 1990. Dalymount also lost the FAI Cup Final in 1990, when it was switched to Lansdowne Road. It briefly recovered the final in 1996, when it held the replayed final between Shelbourne and St Patrick's Athletic and in 1997 and 1998, when it hosted Cup Final again. However, in 1999, the final was switched to Tolka Park and in 2003 back to Lansdowne Road. Even when Landsdowne was being redeveloped from 2006 to 2010, Dalymount was not considered suitable to host the Cup Final, which was held at the Royal Dublin Society stadium in 2007 and 2008 and Tallaght Stadium in 2009.

=== Redevelopment ===
Bohemians have redeveloped the ground to some extent. In 1999, the old main stand was replaced by a modern structure with 2,742 seats, known as the "Jodi Stand". This was at a cost of £1.1 million. This new structure replaced the 90-year-old wooden stand and at the time was meant to be phase one of the redevelopment of Dalymount Park.

Half of the terrace on the opposite side was knocked down, the remainder had seats installed on the terracing and held 3,720 but has no roof cover which limited its use until it was closed for health and safety reasons in 2011. The old "Shed End", now called "The Des Kelly Carpets Stand" has similarly had seats added and now has a capacity of 1,485 and is now commonly used as an away section. The terrace behind the opposite goal (or "Tramway End") has been sold and is also therefore closed, leaving the ground with only two operational sides, and a capacity of just 4,227 until 2023.

For the 2023 League of Ireland Premier Division season, a new stand was opened for away supporters on the Connaught Street side

Shamrock Rovers also played the 2005 season at Dalymount Park, as did the now-defunct team Dublin City F.C. in 2006, who drew very low crowds. Galway United director Nial O'Reilly claimed to have seen "52 spectators at the match" when his club played away to Dublin City.

The stadium has also been used to host European games of other teams when their own stadia were deemed unsuitable, such as Drogheda United's Champions League qualifiers and UEFA Cup games of 2006, 2007, and 2008. Shamrock Rovers played their first 11 European games at Dalymount as Milltown was deemed too small at the time. Shelbourne played their first five European games at Dalymount Park against illustrious opposition such as Barcelona, Atlético Madrid and Sporting Lisbon.

Sporting Fingal played their Europa League match against Portuguese side C.S. Maritimo at the stadium as Fingal's new ground had yet to be completed. In December 2010, Sporting Fingal announced that they were to play their home games at Dalymount during the 2011 Airtricity League season however, the club folded less than two months later.

Dalymount hosted a game in the 2011 UEFA Regions' Cup between Ligue de Normandie of France and Abruzzo of Italy. In the 2016 domestic league season, tenants Bohemian F.C. drew an average home league attendance of 1,480.

=== Abandoned development plans ===
In 2003, a deal was agreed to sell the Tramway End to the owner of the Phibsboro Shopping Centre, a property company named Albion.

On 4 May 2006, Bohemian F.C. members voted to allow the club's board enter into negotiations for the sale of Dalymount Park. The proposed deal would have seen Andorey Developments pay €25 million for the ground in Phibsborough as well as building the club a new stadium in Castleknock, at a cost of €21 million to Andorey.

On 5 September 2006, club members approved a second, increased offer from Danniger Developments. The new offer would have resulted in the sale of Dalymount Park to property developer Liam Carroll for €45 million and a new purpose-built 10,000-seater stadium (with a projected cost of €21 million, to be met by the developer). The club would then relocate to the proposed stadium near Dublin Airport, four miles from their current home.

However, Albion objected to the sale based on their claim to ownership of the Tramway End. Bohemians maintained that the 2003 purchase by Albion had not been finalised and the matter went to the courts to resolve the dispute over legal ownership of the stand. On 7 November 2008, Bohemian F.C. lost the court case to Albion Properties Ltd over the ownership of a section of the Tramway End at Dalymount Park, putting the deal with Liam Carroll in serious doubt. By August 2009, Carroll had lost his own court battle to enter examinership, sending both the Zoe Group and Danniger into liquidation, and leaving Carroll unable to finance the purchase of Dalymount.

In late 2009, the owner of Albion Ltd offered to build a new €18 million stadium for Bohs in return for Dalymount Park, with Albion wanting the ground to help redevelop the adjoining Phibsborough Shopping Centre. Given the collapse of the Irish property sector, this did not materialise and by April 2012, the National Asset Management Agency (NAMA) had assumed ownership of the Tramway End. In anticipation of securing the Carroll deal, Bohemians had taken out a loan with Zurich Bank. This debt, along with a prior lien on Dalymount Park granted to club members, put the club in a weak financial position.

=== Council purchase and proposed groundshare ===
Bohemians announced in March 2015 that Dublin City Council would pay the balance of the debt owed to Zurich (€3.4M) and take ownership of Dalymount Park. The council completed the purchase in June 2015 for €3.8 million. The council's plan was to lease a redeveloped Dalymount to the Football Association of Ireland, who would in turn agree a groundshare with both Bohemians and Shelbourne F.C. As part of the plan, Shelbourne would need to surrender their lease on Tolka Park to the city council, who held the freehold (i.e., the land underneath the stadium). Tolka Park would then be demolished for housing to help the council recoup their investment. It was proposed that Bohemians, the council and the stadium would emerge from the deal "debt-free". The Dalymount deal went ahead despite issues with the Tolka Park acquisition.

While it was announced in October 2016 that Shelbourne FC would be moving in, by February 2022, Shelbourne proposed the purchase of Tolka Park, and the cancellation of the plan to share Dalymount.

=== Council redevelopment proposals ===
In October 2018, the council published plans for the redevelopment of the stadium into a 6,000-seater UEFA Category 3 facility. The council had published preliminary plans in 2016 to demolish and rebuild Dalymount on a phased basis at a cost of €20 million. The work was contingent on works on the neighbouring Phibsborough Shopping Centre site, which was controlled by the National Asset Management Agency. A related deal was concluded in February 2019. It was suggested that Bohemians and Shelbourne would need to play elsewhere during redevelopment. Government funding of €900,000 was announced in February 2020, with Bohs set to play in Tolka Park. Tolka Park may remain in operation according to Dublin City Council.

By mid-2022, the development plans had not progressed, and "scaled back" options were under consideration by the council, "amid rising cost concerns". Even so, demolition of the Connaught Street Stand went ahead in August. In October 2022, the council published its updated redevelopment plans, with a proposed capacity of 7,880 and a completion date of 2026.

In February 2024, Dublin City Council approved a grant of €40 million for the redevelopment of the stadium to a capacity of 8,000, with the club hoping to complete construction by the 2027 season. In November 2024, the project was awarded a €25 million sports capital grant.

In September 2025, the Phibsborough Shopping Centre was acquired by Dublin property company Twinlite Real Estate. The future of the shopping centre is linked to the planned redevelopment of Dalymount Park. Twinlite did not outline a timeline for construction, but said further details of its proposal for Phibsboro Shopping Centre would follow in due course.

In November 2025, Dublin City Council approved the borrowing of €34million to get the project underway. DCC sought tenders in April 2026. The May 2026 derby against Shamrock Rovers was billed as the last to be played at the old Dalymount, before redevelopment begins. The club confirmed they would remain at Dalymount Park until May 2027 when work on the new stadium will begin.

== Structure and facilities ==
Dalymount Park has three spectator areas; to the north (Mono Stand), south (Jodi Stand) and west (Des Kelly Stand) of the pitch. The east terrace, known as the Tramway End, is no longer in use.

=== Jodi Stand ===
The original wooden 1930s Leitch Stand was replaced by the Jodi Stand in 1999. A covered, single tier all-seater stand, it has a capacity of 2,742. The stand is named after Jodi Sportswear, a company owned by former player and club president Tony O'Connell. The space beneath the Jodi Stand is used for offices, bars, changing and store rooms and, as of September 2022, has been the hub of the club's administrative and social life for 90 years.

=== Des Kelly Stand ===
Situated behind the west goal end, this stand is also known as the Shed End or the School End due to its proximity to St. Peter's National School. Access to the stand is via St. Peter's Road. The stand is a mix of seating and terracing with a total capacity of 1,300. Half of the stand was covered by a roof, with the barrel-shaped awning said to resemble a shed, hence the nickname. The roof was removed in August 2021.

=== Mono Stand ===
The stand, located on the north side of the ground, is named posthumously after club volunteer Derek 'Mono' Monaghan. It was built in 2023 after the demolition of the Connaught Street stand. A covered single tier standing terrace, it houses away fans and has a capacity of 450.

== Notable games ==
=== Irish international matches ===
Irish international matches held at Dalymount Park have included:

Date	Competition	Flag	Country	Score
26/04/1904	1904 British Home Championship	Scotland	Scotland	1–1
17/03/1906	1906 British Home Championship	Scotland	Scotland	0–1
14/03/1908	1908 British Home Championship	Scotland	Scotland	0–5
10/02/1912	1912 British Home Championship	England	England	1–6
15/03/1913	1913 British Home Championship	Scotland	Scotland	1-2
14/06/1924	Friendly		United States	3–1
20/04/1929	Friendly	Belgium	Belgium	4–0
13/12/1931	Friendly	Spain	Spain	0–5
25/02/1934	1934 FIFA World Cup qualification	Belgium	Belgium	4–4
16/12/1934	Friendly	Hungary	Hungary	2–4
08/12/1935	Friendly		Netherlands	3–5
17/03/1936	Friendly		Switzerland	1–0
17/10/1936	Friendly	German Reich	Germany	5–2
06/12/1936	Friendly	Hungary	Hungary	2–3
07/12/1937	1938 FIFA World Cup qualification	Norway	Norway	3–3
18/09/1938	Friendly	Switzerland	Switzerland	4–0
13/11/1938	Friendly	Poland	Poland	3–2
30/06/1946	Friendly	England	England	0–1
02/03/1947	Friendly	Spain	Spain	3–2
14/05/1947	Friendly	Portugal	Portugal	0–2
05/12/1948	Friendly	Switzerland	Switzerland	0–1
24/04/1949	Friendly	Belgium	Belgium	0–2
22/05/1949	Friendly	Portugal	Portugal	1–0
12/06/1949	Friendly	Spain	Spain	1–4
08/09/1949	Friendly	Finland	Finland	3–0
13/11/1949	Friendly	Sweden	Sweden	1–3
26/11/1950	Friendly	Norway	Norway	2–2
13/5/1951	Friendly	Argentina	Argentina	0–1
17/10/1951	Friendly	Germany	West Germany	3–2
16/11/1952	1954 FIFA World Cup qualification	France	France	3–5
28/10/1953	1954 FIFA World Cup qualification	Luxembourg	Luxembourg	4–0
07/11/1954	Friendly	Norway	Norway	2–1
19/10/1955	Friendly	SFR Yugoslavia	Yugoslavia	1–4
27/11/1955	Friendly	Spain	Spain	2–2
03/10/1956	1958 FIFA World Cup qualification	Denmark	Denmark	2–1
25/11/1956	Friendly	Germany	West Germany	3–0
19/05/1957	1958 FIFA World Cup qualification	England	England	1–1
05/10/1958	Friendly	Poland	Poland	2–2
05/04/1959	1960 European Nations' Cup preliminary Qualifying Round	Czechoslovakia	Czechoslovakia	2–0
01/11/1959	Friendly	Sweden	Sweden	3–2
30/03/1960	Friendly	Chile	Chile	2–0
28/09/1960	Friendly	Wales	Wales	2–3
06/11/1960	Friendly	Norway	Norway	3–1
07/05/1961	1962 FIFA World Cup qualification	Scotland	Scotland	0–3
08/10/1961	1962 FIFA World Cup qualification	Czechoslovakia	Czechoslovakia	1–3
08/04/1962	Friendly	Austria	Austria	2–3
12/08/1962	1964 European Nations' Cup Qualifying Round	Iceland	Iceland	4–2
09/06/1963	Friendly	Scotland	Scotland	1–0
13/10/1963	1964 European Nations' Cup Eighth Finals	Austria	Austria	3–2
08/04/1964	1964 European Nations' Cup Quarter Finals	Spain	Spain	0–2
24/05/1964	Friendly	England	England	1–3
25/10/1964	Friendly	Poland	Poland	3–2
24/04/1965	Friendly	Belgium	Belgium	0–2
05/05/1965	1966 FIFA World Cup qualification	Spain	Spain	1–0
04/05/1966	Friendly	Germany	West Germany	0–4
23/10/1966	UEFA Euro 1968 Qualifying Group	Spain	Spain	0–0
16/11/1966	UEFA Euro 1968 Qualifying Group	Turkey	Turkey	2–1
21/05/1967	UEFA Euro 1968 Qualifying Group	Czechoslovakia	Czechoslovakia	0–2
15/05/1968	Friendly	Poland	Poland	2–2
10/11/1968	Friendly	Austria	Austria	2–2
04/12/1968	1970 FIFA World Cup qualification	Denmark	Denmark	abnd. (Note: Match was 1–1 up until the 51st minute, when the game was abandoned due to fog.)
04/05/1969	1970 FIFA World Cup qualification	Czechoslovakia	Czechoslovakia	1–2
08/06/1969	1970 FIFA World Cup qualification	Hungary	Hungary	1–2
21/09/1969	Friendly	Scotland	Scotland	1–1
15/10/1969	1970 FIFA World Cup qualification	Denmark	Denmark	1–1
23/09/1970	Friendly	Poland	Poland	0–2
14/10/1970	UEFA Euro 1972 Qualifying Group	Sweden	Sweden	1–1
30/05/1971	UEFA Euro 1972 Qualifying Group	Austria	Austria	1–4
15/11/1972	1974 FIFA World Cup qualification	France	France	2–1
21/10/1973	Friendly	Poland	Poland	1–0
30/10/1974	UEFA Euro 1976 Qualifying Group	the Soviet Union	USSR	3–0
11/3/1975	Friendly	Germany	West Germany'B'	1–0
29/10/1975	UEFA Euro 1976 Qualifying Group	Turkey	Turkey	4–0
24/03/1976	Friendly	Norway	Norway	3–0
24/04/1977	Friendly	Poland	Poland	0–0
29/10/1979	Friendly	United States	United States	3–2
12/10/1983	UEFA Euro 1984 Qualifying Group		Netherlands	2–3
16/11/1983	UEFA Euro 1984 Qualifying Group	Malta	Malta	8–0
23/05/1984	Friendly	Poland	Poland	0–0
08/08/1984	Friendly	Mexico	Mexico	0–0
05/02/1985	Friendly	Italy	Italy	1–2
10/11/1987	Friendly	Israel	Israel	5–0
07/02/1989	Friendly	France	France	0–0
12/09/1990	Friendly	Morocco	Morocco	1–0

=== Cup finals ===
Dalymount hosted many cup finals before the partition of Ireland. It hosted six Irish Cup (Irish Football Association) finals and two replays. It also has hosted the Irish Free State Cup final and its successor the FAI Cup final on numerous occasions. A number of cross-border cup competition finals were hosted in Dalymount such as the Blaxnit Cup and Dublin and Belfast Intercity Cup.

Date	Competition	Winners	Score	Runners-up	Attendance
13 March 1903	Irish Cup	Distillery	1–1	Bohemians	
28 April 1906	Irish Cup	Shelbourne	2–0	Belfast Celtic	
20 April 1907	Irish Cup	Cliftonville	1–0	Shelbourne	
21 March 1908	Irish Cup	Bohemians	1–1	Shelbourne	
28 March 1908	Irish Cup (Replay)	Bohemians	3–1	Shelbourne	
10 April 1909	Irish Cup	Cliftonville	2–1	Bohemians	
25 March 1911	Irish Cup	Shelbourne	0–0	Bohemians	
15 April 1911	Irish Cup (Replay)	Shelbourne	2–1	Bohemians	
17 March 1922	Irish Free State Cup Final	St James's Gate	1–1	Shamrock Rovers	15,000
8 April 1922	Irish Free State Cup Final Replay	St James's Gate	1–0	Shamrock Rovers	10,000
17 March 1923	Irish Free State Cup Final	Alton United	1–0	Shelbourne	14,000
17 March 1924	Irish Free State Cup Final	Athlone Town	1–0	Fordsons	18,000
17 March 1925	Irish Free State Cup Final	Shamrock Rovers	1–0	Shelbourne	23,000
22/05/1968	Blaxnit Cup Final (2nd Leg)	Shamrock Rovers	1–2	Crusaders	
23/05/1969	Blaxnit Cup Final (2nd Leg)	Shamrock Rovers	2–2	Coleraine	
22/05/1970	Blaxnit Cup Final (2nd Leg)	Sligo Rovers	1–4	Coleraine	
12/05/1996	FAI Cup (Replay)	Shelbourne	2–1	St Pat's Athletic	
04/05/1997	FAI Cup	Shelbourne	2–0	Derry City	
10/05/1998	FAI Cup	Cork City	0–0	Shelbourne	
16/05/1998	FAI Cup (Replay)	Cork City	1–0	Shelbourne	

== Other uses ==
Dalymount Park has hosted live music in the past, most notably the only Irish concert by Bob Marley and the Wailers on 6 July 1980, which turned out to be Marley's last ever outdoor concert before he died. On 21 August 1977, Dalymount was the second Irish venue to host a rock concert by Thin Lizzy after their 1970 festival in Richmond Park, Inchicore and the Boomtown Rats and was profiled in Hot Press magazine. It hosted Status Quo in 1979.

In 1993 and 1994, Dalymount Park hosted the sunstroke festival featuring the cream of alternative music such as Faith No More, Sonic Youth, Sugar, Belly, The Disposable Heroes of Hiphoprisy, Red Hot Chili Peppers, Ice Cube, Therapy?, Helmet amongst others.

In 2001, a planned Destiny's Child concert was moved from the venue when safety inspectors found it to be unsuitable.

In 2015 Dalymount Park hosted Shamrock Bowl XXIX for the IAFL between the Belfast Trojans and Trinity College Dublin American Football.

International Rugby League Matches
Date	Home	Score	Opponent	Competition	Attendance
1 November 2003	Ireland	18–26	France	2003 European Nations Cup	1,082

== See also ==
- List of association football stadiums in the Republic of Ireland
- Stadiums of Ireland
