= IAFL College Bowl =

Former American Football tournament in Ireland

- First played: 2007
- Last played: 2019

The IAFL College Bowl was a college football tournament contested by collegiate participants of the Irish American Football League between 2006 and 2019. Four teams competed in the championship: the UL Vikings, the DCU Saints, Trinity College, and UCD. The final champions were UCD, having defeated the UL Vikings 17-8 in 2019.

== History ==
Initially, the championship was a single game between the two collegiate participants of the IAFL, the DCU Saints and UL Vikings, overseen by the Colleges and Universities Sports Association of Ireland (CUSAI).The UL Vikings were victorious in the first three iterations, defeating the DCU Saints by scores of 58-0, 50-2 and 47-12. In 2009, the championship became a four-team tournament with the addition of Trinity College and UCD. The Vikings were again successful, defeating the Saints in the final.

In 2010, Trinity College captured the Championship for the first time in spectacular fashion. Facing the UL Vikings in Limerick, the game finished 12-6 after triple overtime (7 quarters) and 3 hours and 45 minutes of play; an IAFL record for match length. The victory was sealed in the third quarter of overtime with a touchdown from Rob McDowell. Linebacker Stephen Carton was named game MVP. The club retained their title in 2011, defeating UCD by a margin of 7-0.

The College Bowl was reformatted by the IAFL as the IAFL Intervarsity Championship in 2014, in line with a league reorganization that allowed collegiate teams to participate alongside other IAFL teams in competition for the Shamrock Bowl. After the restructuring of the IAFL into American Football Ireland (AFI) in 2020 and two years of suspended play in 2020 and 2021 across all competitions, the league has not addressed the potential return of the Intervarsity Championship; while DCU Saints disbanded in 2013 and Trinity College experienced a hiatus beginning in 2024, UCD and UL Vikings have continued to field full-kitted AFI sides.

== Results ==
Date	Winning team		Losing team		Location	Notes	Ref.
March 19, 2006	UL Vikings	58	DCU Saints	0	University of Limerick		
June 3, 2007	UL Vikings	50	DCU Saints	2	DCU Sports Grounds		
July 6, 2008	UL Vikings	47	DCU Saints	12	DCU Sports Grounds		
November 21, 2009	UL Vikings	22	DCU Saints	0	University of Limerick	Trinity College came 3rd, defeating UCD 8-0	
November 20, 2010	Trinity College	12	UL Vikings	6	University of Limerick	UCD and DCU did not compete	
December 3, 2011	Trinity College	7	UCD	0	Trinity Sports Grounds	UL Vikings did not compete	
2012	Trinity College		UL Vikings				
2013	Trinity College	12	UL Vikings	0	University of Limerick		
2014	UCD	26	Trinity College	20			
2017	UCD		UL Vikings				
2018	UCD	8	Trinity College	6			
November 16, 2019	UCD	17	UL Vikings	8	University of Limerick		
