= Shamrock Bowl XXII =

- Event: 2008 IAFL Season
UL Vikings	Dublin Rebels
South	Central
14	12
- Date: 10 August 2008
- Venue: CIT Stadium, Cork

Shamrock Bowl XXII was played on August 10, 2008. The match featured the Irish American Football League South Division champions University of Limerick Vikings defeating the IAFL Central Division champions Dublin Rebels in CIT Stadium, Cork, Ireland.

The UL Vikings won their second consecutive Shamrock Bowl title by defeating the Dublin Rebels 14-12. The MVP of the game was Adrian Garvey who scored the Vikings sole offensive touchdown of the game.

The game was a rematch of the week 13 regular season game when the Rebels beat the Vikings 32-14. The game was staged in CIT Stadium. This was the second Shamrock Bowl played in a stadium as all other Shamrock Bowls were played in ordinary sports grounds.

== Teams ==
=== UL Vikings ===
The University of Limerick Vikings entered their third Shamrock Bowl as the reigning champions from 2007. In addition the Vikings had a 7-1 record from the regular season. The Vikings won the IAFL South Division. During the playoffs, the Vikings beat the Belfast Trojans 42-8 in the semi-finals to secure their spot in the Shamrock Bowl.

=== Dublin Rebels ===
The Dublin Rebels entered their seventh Shamrock bowl 7-1 record from the regular season and were the champions of the IAFL Central Division. Their 19-12 win in the semi-finals against the Cork Admirals secured their spot in the Shamrock Bowl. The Rebels had been undefeated in their previous six Shamrock Bowl appearances.

== Game summary ==
The game began with the UL Vikings kicking off to the Dublin Rebels and Kevin Finnegan returned the ball into Limerick territory. The Rebels Quarterback Andy Dennehy then proceeded to lead a drive to get to the Limerick redzone. Running back Finnegan was a threat for Dublin. The Vikings defence then stepped up their game and big tackles from Kieran Coen and Bill Parkinson stopped the Dublin drive. Vikings QB JP Nerbun then took over and had trouble moving the ball initially against the tough Dublin defense.

A great punt by Daniel Smith put Dublin under pressure but they continued to move the ball well and got back into Limerick territory. A fumble by the Vikings was recovered by the Rebels and they then opened the scoring with a 28-yard field goal by Paul Grogan which put them up three to nil. The Vikes then steeled their resolve and began to gain yards on offense. JP Nerbun completed passes to Tight end Glen Carr and receiver Marc Ashworth and game MVP Adrian Garvey made some big gains on the ground.

This pressure continued and the Rebels were almost powerless to stop the drive. Garvey punched in the first touchdown of the game from 23 yards out with a dazzling run which combined great speed, elusive moves and crushing strength at the end to put him over the line. The blocking of Mark Thompson, Brendan Moroney, Jim Davis, Kieran Coen, Dave Moloney and Glen Carr was crucial on the drive also. The extra point attempt was blocked. The Rebels then took to the air in a bid to regain the lead. Dennehy completed passes to tight end Paul Smyth. Darragh O'Callaghan then stepped in front of a pass, juggled it for a moment and then secured possession. The Viking defence then turned to blockers and in what resembled a feeding frenzy, O'Callaghan found running room and took the ball all the way back for another Viking touchdown. The sizeable Limerick crowd went crazy after the play. JP Nerbun then threw a spectacular fade pass to Seamus Feehan who snagged the ball and kept his feet in bounds for the 2-point conversion. This score would prove crucial at the final whistle. The rest of the 2nd quarter saw the ball change hands a couple of times but no scores.

=== 2nd Half ===
The 3rd quarter saw the Rebels come back strongly showing what made them national champions four times this decade. They were awarded 2 points for a safety for a block below the waist penalty on a punt. They then put together their first touchdown drive through great running from Ross McCoohey and Kevin Finnegan which was capped by a touchdown pass to Tight End Paul Smyth. Paul Grogan kicked the extra point. This cut the Vikings lead to only two points and put them in serious danger.

The fourth quarter was dominated by both teams defences and was a showcase of tense and entertaining football. Garvey continued to pound away on the ground getting the Vikings valuable first downs and keeping the Rebels out of range of scoring. The Vikings defense made some huge stops this quarter with Danny Smith, Mark Gaffney, Cormac Ryan and Kieran Coen making important tackles. The Rebels moved the ball into field goal range and attempted a kick to put them one point up with 3 minutes left. Kieran Coen and Glen Carr surged through the Rebels line pushing one of the Rebels linemen back far enough for the kick to bounce off the lineman's helmet and away to safety. The ball was tipped off line and the kick was no good.

The Vikings then drove the back up the pitch and took 2 minutes off the clock. The Rebels got the ball back again and drove down the field. The atmosphere in the stadium was electric as every play in the drive was life or death. Andy Dennehy completed a number of passes and the Rebels were moving well until the Vikings Safety Liam Ryan made a diving interception in front of Paul Smyth to seal the game and secure the Vikings second national championship. Adrian Garvey then picked up a first down and the last seconds ticked off of a hugely entertaining Shamrock Bowl.
