= South Circular Road =

South Circular Road may refer to:

- South Circular Road, London, a road in South London, also known as the A205
- South Circular Road, Dublin, a road in southern Dublin, also known as the R811
- South Circular Road, Limerick
