= Dublin street corners =

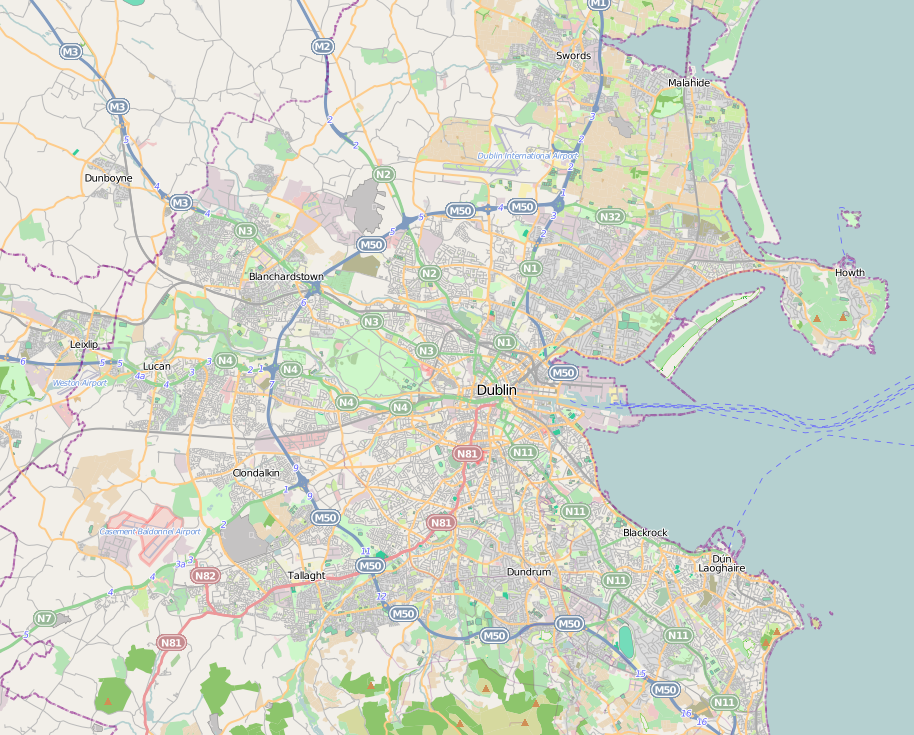
Map of Dublin showing the "corners"
Map of central Dublin showing four of the "corners"

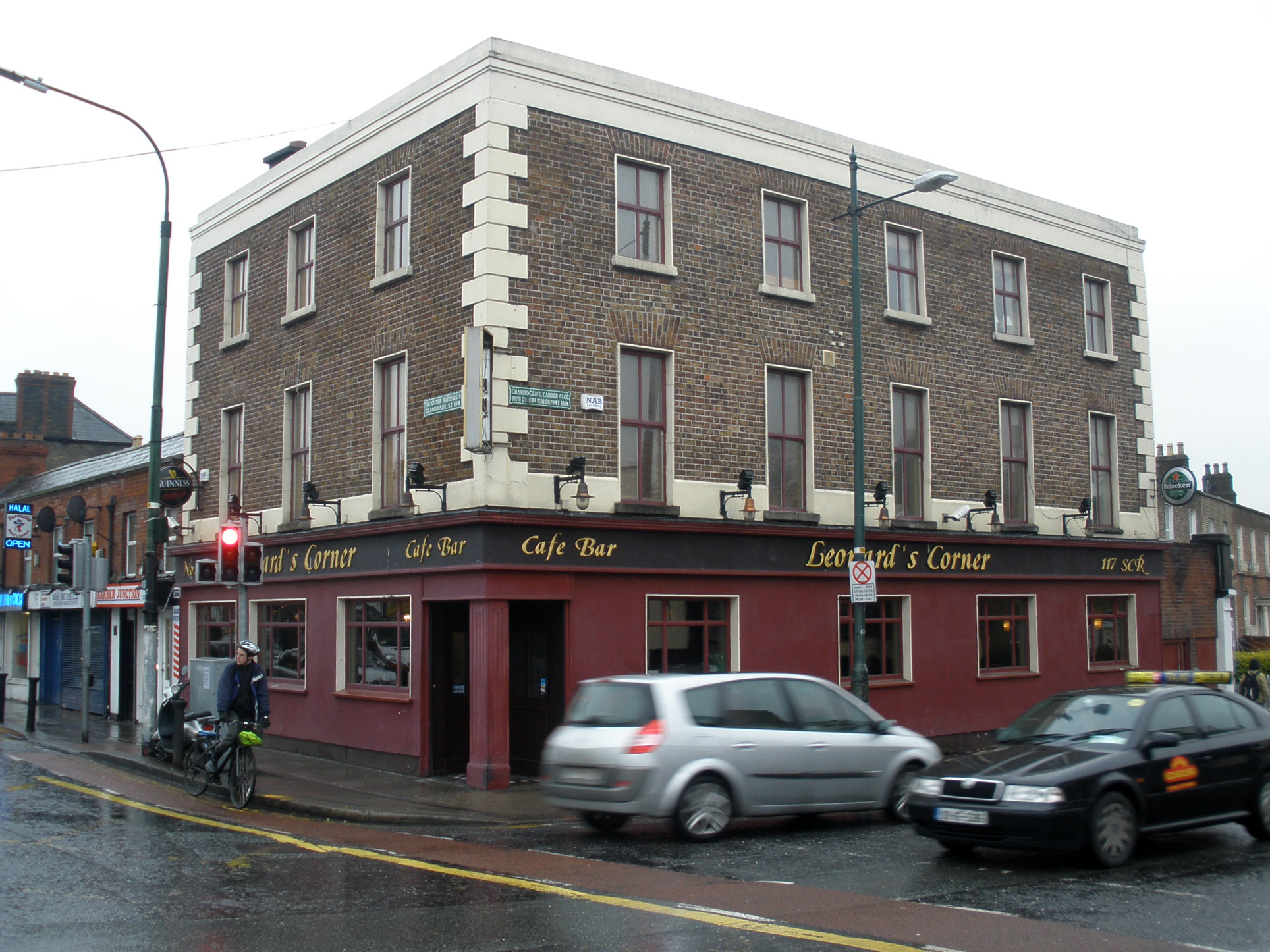
Leonard's Corner, Dublin

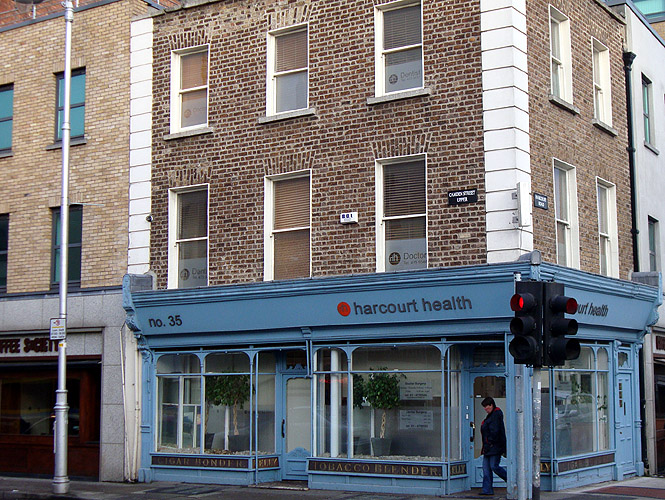
Kelly's Corner, Dublin

Several notable junctions in Dublin city in Ireland still carry the name (usually unofficially) of the pub or business which once occupied the corner.

While this practice is not unique to Dublin, the pace of recent development there has meant that the original source of the name is more likely to have disappeared.

Examples include:

- Baker's Corner at the junction of Rochestown Avenue and Kill Lane in Deansgrange;
- Doyle's Corner at the junction of the North Circular Road (R135 / R147) and Phibsborough Road (R135) in Phibsborough;
- Edge's Corner at the junction of the North Strand Road (Annesley Bridge Road) and Fairview Strand;
- Hanlon's Corner at the junction of the North Circular Road (R101) with Prussia Street and the Old Cabra Road (both R805);
- Hart's Corner at the junction of Botanic Road, Finglas Road, and Prospect Road (all R135) in Glasnevin;
- Kelly's Corner at the junction of the R114 road (Upper Camden Street and Richmond Street) and the South Circular Road (Harrington Street and Harcourt Road);
- Leonard's Corner at the junction of the South Circular Road and Clanbrassil Street;
- Vaughan's Corner at the junction of the N81 road (Terenure Road North and Terenure Place) and the R114 road (Terenure Road East and Rathfarnham Road) in Terenure.

Other street corners have been named after notable people, for example Rory Gallagher Corner in Temple Bar.
