= Phibsborough Luas stop =

Tram stop in Dublin, Ireland

Phibsborough Baile Phib
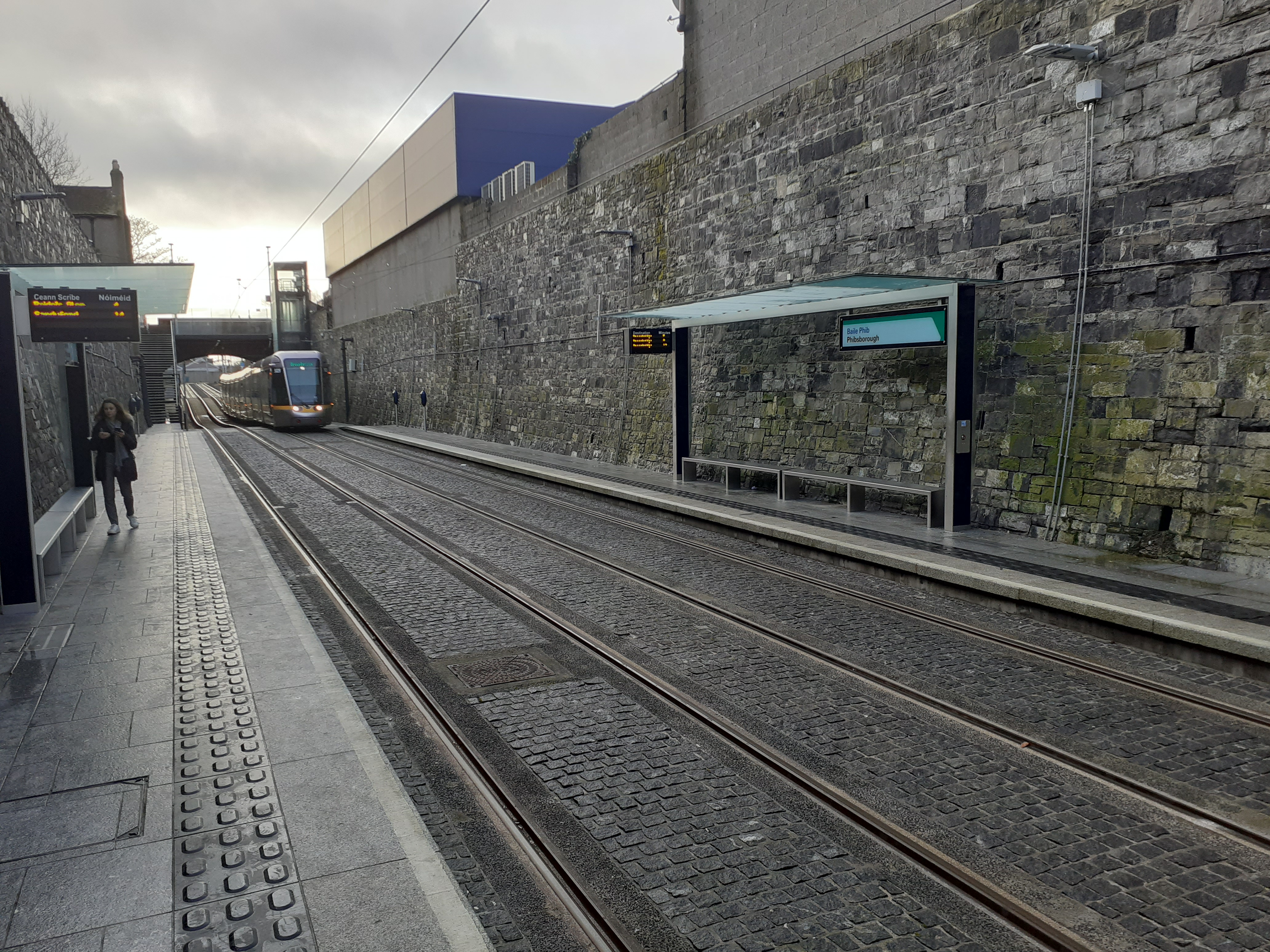

General information
- Location: Dublin; Ireland
- Coordinates: 53°21′37″N 6°16′44″W
- Owner: Transport Infrastructure Ireland
- Operator: Transdev (as Luas)
- Line: Green
- Platforms: 2

Construction
- Structure type: In cutting
- Accessible: Yes

Other information
- Fare zone: Green 1

Key dates
- 9 December 2017: Stop opened

Services
Preceding station	Luas	Following station
Cabra towards Broombridge	Green Line	Grangegorman towards Sandyford or Brides Glen
Location
- Location within Central Dublin

Phibsborough (Irish: Baile Phib) is a stop on the Luas light-rail tram system in Dublin, Ireland. It opened in 2017 as a stop on Luas Cross City, an extension of the Green Line through the city centre from St. Stephen's Green to Broombridge.

The stop provides access to the neighbourhood of Phibsborough and the Dalymount Park football stadium.

== Layout ==
Phibsborough stop is located in the cutting which once took heavy rail trains to Dublin Broadstone railway station but lay disused for many years. The stop is in-between Cabra Road and North Circular Road, both of which cross the line on bridges. The cutting is very narrow at this point, and the stop is bound by steep walls on each side covered with stone bricks. The edge platforms are considerably narrower than on most Luas stops, and have shelters, benches, information displays and TFI Leap Card validators.

The stop has entrances at both ends, taking passengers from the road bridges onto wooden walkways over the tracks. At each end there is a wooden staircase directly opposite the entrance and a glass lift shaft on the opposite side. The ticket machines are also located at this level. Owing to the limited space, Phibsborough is the only Luas stop which does not have ticket machines at platform level.
