= Belfast Knights =

American Football team in Ireland

- Sport: American football
- Founded: 1993
- Association: American Football Ireland
- League: AFI Premier Division (Shamrock Bowl Conference)
- Based in: Belfast, Northern Ireland
- Stadium: Gibson Park, Cregagh
- Colours: Black, Yellow
- Head coach: Adam Devenney
- Championships: Shamrock Bowl Winners: 1997, 1998, 2002
- Website: belfastknights.com

The Belfast Knights are an American Football team based in Belfast, Northern Ireland. The club is the oldest continuously running team on the island of Ireland. Founded in 1993, the Knights have competed in 10 Shamrock Bowl championship games and won three, winning in 1997, 1998 and 2002. Prior to 2017, the club was known as the Carrickfergus Knights and played their home matches at Woodburn Field, Carrickfergus RFC in Carrickfergus, County Antrim. Since moving to Belfast in 2017, the team has played their home matches at Malone RFC in Gibson Park, Cregagh, Belfast.

== Honours ==
- Shamrock Bowl Champions (3): XII (1997), XIII (1998), XVI (2002).
- Shamrock Bowl Finalists (7): IX (1994), X (1995), XIV (1999), XV (2001), XVII (2003), XVIII (2004), XXXI (2017).
- IAFL North Divisions Champions (3): 2010, 2011, 2017.

== Season by season IAFL records ==
Season records
| Season | W | L | T | Finish | Playoff results |
|---|---|---|---|---|---|
IAFL
| 1994 | ? | ? | ? | ?? | Runner-up – Shamrock Bowl IX |
| 1995 | ? | ? | ? | ?? | Runner-up – Shamrock Bowl X |
| 1996 | ? | ? | ? | ?? | ?? |
| 1997 | ? | ? | ? | IAFL League Champions | Champions – Shamrock Bowl XII |
| 1998 | 6 | 0 | 2 | IAFL League Champions | Champions – Shamrock Bowl XIII |
| 1999 | ? | ? | ? | ?? | Runner-up – Shamrock Bowl XIV |
| 2000 | 0 | 0 | 0 | No League Play | N/A |
| 2001 | 5 | 1 | 0 | IAFL League Champions | Runner-up – Shamrock Bowl XV |
| 2002 | 4 | 2 | 0 | 2nd IAFL | Champions – Shamrock Bowl XVI |
| 2003 | 5 | 1 | 0 | IAFL League Champions | Runner-up – Shamrock Bowl XVII |
| 2004 | 6 | 1 | 1 | 2nd IAFL | Runner-up – Shamrock Bowl XVIII |
| 2005 | 5 | 2 | 1 | 3rd IAFL | Beaten Semi-finalists |
| 2006 | 6 | 2 | 0 | 2nd IAFL | Beaten Semi-finalists |
| 2007 | 3 | 4 | 1 | 3rd IAFL North | – |
| 2008 | 3 | 5 | 0 | 2nd IAFL North | – |
| 2009 | 6 | 2 | 0 | 3rd IAFL | Beaten Semi-finalists |
| 2010 | 6 | 2 | 0 | 3rd IAFL | Beaten Semi-finalists |
| 2011 | 6 | 2 | 0 | 2nd IAFL | Beaten Semi-finalists |
| 2012 | 2 | 6 | 0 | 3rd IAFL North | Beaten Semi-finalists |
| 2013 | 3 | 4 | 1 | IAFL North SBC | Beaten Quarter-Finalists |
| 2014 | 3 | 5 | 0 | IAFL North SBC | Beaten Quarter-Finalists |
| 2015 | 2 | 6 | 0 | IAFL North SBC | – |
| 2016 | 5 | 3 | 0 | IAFL North SBC | Beaten Quarter-Finalists |
| 2017 | 5 | 3 | 0 | IAFL North SBC Champions | Runner-up – Shamrock Bowl XXXI |
| Totals | 81 | 51 | 6 | | |
