= UCD American Football =

Irish American football team

University College Dublin
Logo

General information
- Founded: 2009
- Stadium: UCD Sports Grounds, Belfield
- Headquartered: Dublin, Ireland
- Colors: Navy blue, sky blue, and white
- Website: ucd.ie

Nickname
- The Students

League / conference affiliations
- AFI Premier Division

Championships
- League championships: 0 (2) 2022, 2024

University College Dublin American Football Club is the official American football team of University College Dublin (UCD), based in Dublin, Ireland. The club competes in both kitted and flag football under the governance of American Football Ireland (AFI). UCD has become one of the leading American football programs in the country, qualifying for four consecutive Shamrock Bowls between 2022 and 2025 and winning in 2022 and 2024.

== History ==
The team was established in 2009 and originally played in the IAFA DV8 Development League beginning in 2009 as well as the intervarsity league competing for the IAFL College Bowl beginning in 2010. UCD won the second-tier IAFL-1 Bowl in 2014 and IAFL College Bowl titles in 2014, 2017, 2018, and 2019. After the return of AFI play after two cancelled seasons in 2020-2021, UCD qualified for four consecutive Shamrock Bowl finals from 2022 to 2025. They captured their first Shamrock Bowl title in 2022 by defeating the Dublin Rebels 52–24. After finishing as Shamrock Bowl finalists in 2023 behind the Rebels, they followed up with a second Shamrock Bowl victory in 2024, winning 36–14 against the same opponent. In 2025 they again qualified for the Shamrock Bowl final, but were defeated by the Belfast Trojans, 27-0.

== Competitions ==
UCD competes in the AFI Premier Division. The team fields squads for both kitted football and non-contact flag football.

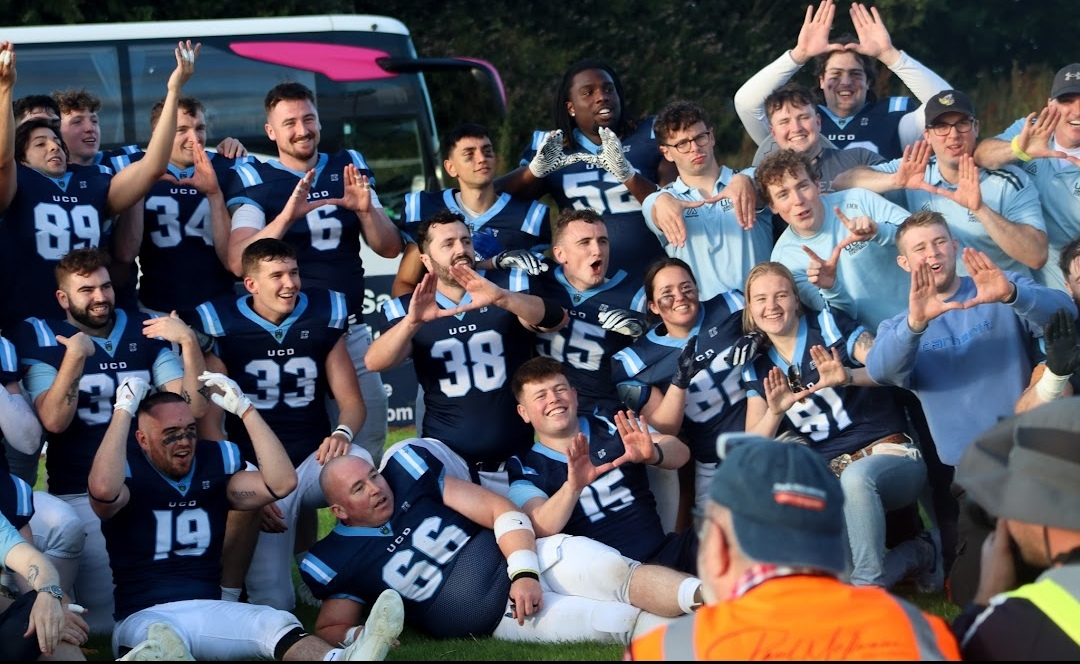
UCD American Football team celebrating their second Shamrock Bowl victory on 28 July 2024

== Honours ==
- Shamrock Bowl Champions (2): XXXIV (2022), XXXVI (2024)
- Shamrock Bowl Finalists (2): 2023, 2025
- IAFL-1 Bowl Champions (1): 2014
- IAFL College Bowl Champions (4): 2014, 2017, 2018, 2019
