= Phibsborough =

Northern inner city district of Dublin, Ireland

Phibsborough Baile Phib (Irish)
- Inner suburb
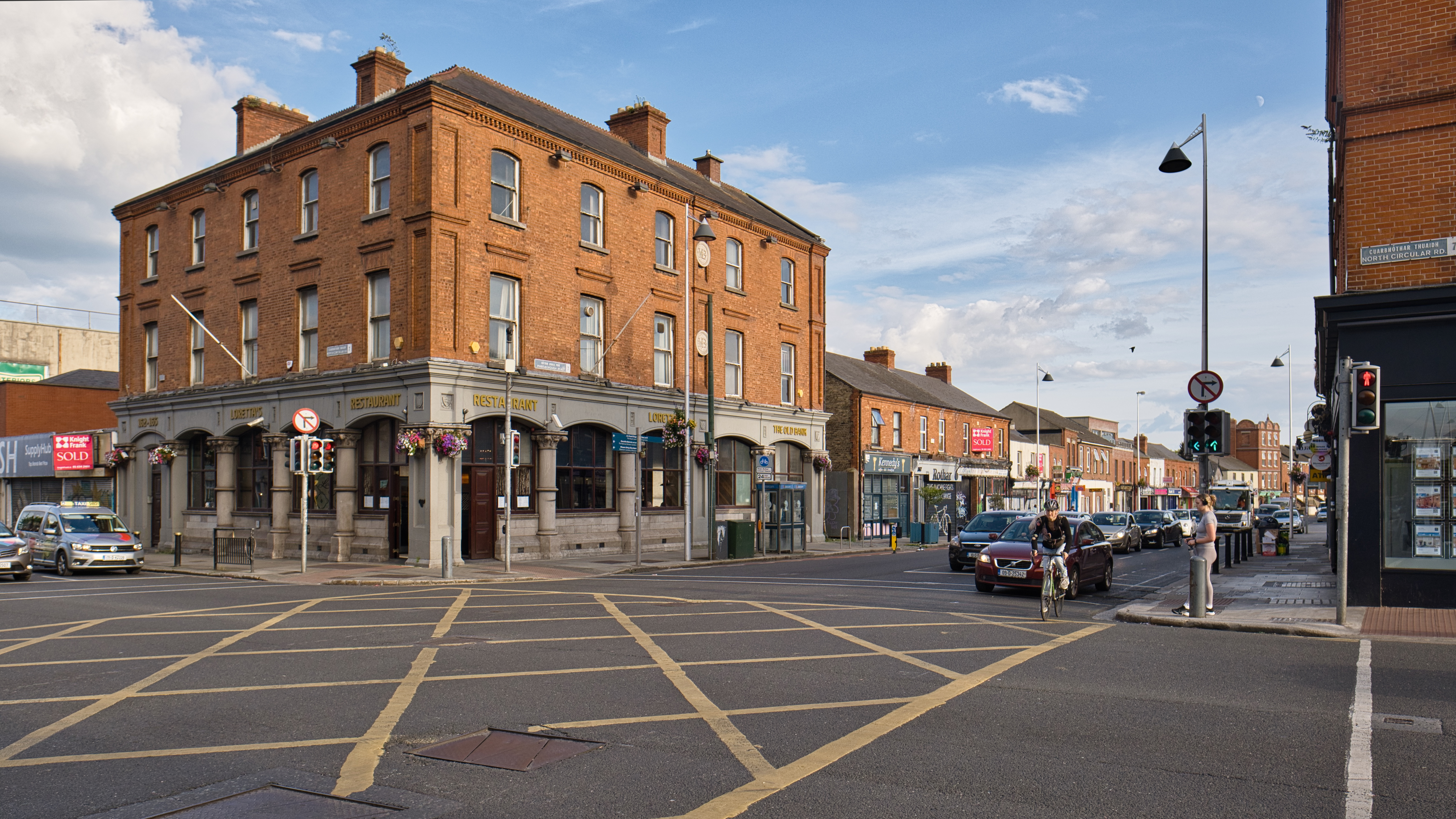
- Crossroads at Phibsborough Road and North Circular Road

- Location of Phibsborough in Dublin
- Coordinates: 53.360665224°N 6.272665576°W
- Country: Ireland
- Province: Leinster
- City: Dublin
- Dáil Éireann: Dublin Central
- European Parliament: Dublin
- Elevation: 49 m (161 ft)
- Eircode routing key: D07
- Irish Grid Reference: O055383

Phibsborough (/ˈfɪbzbərə/; Irish: Baile Phib), also spelled Phibsboro, is a mixed commercial and residential neighbourhood on the Northside of Dublin, Ireland.

The Bradogue River crosses the area in a culvert, and the Royal Canal passes through its northern reaches, notably at Cross Guns Bridge. Formerly, a branch of the canal ran to the Broadstone basin, later the site of the Midland Great Western Railway Terminus and currently the headquarters of Bus Éireann. Mountjoy Prison is located in the district.

== Etymology ==
The name "Phibsborough" comes from "Phipps" or "Phibbs." This is believed to relate to the Lincolnshire settler Richard Phibbs of Coote's Horse, resident in Kilmainham from the mid-17th century. The spelling is cited as Phippsborough in 1792.

== Location ==
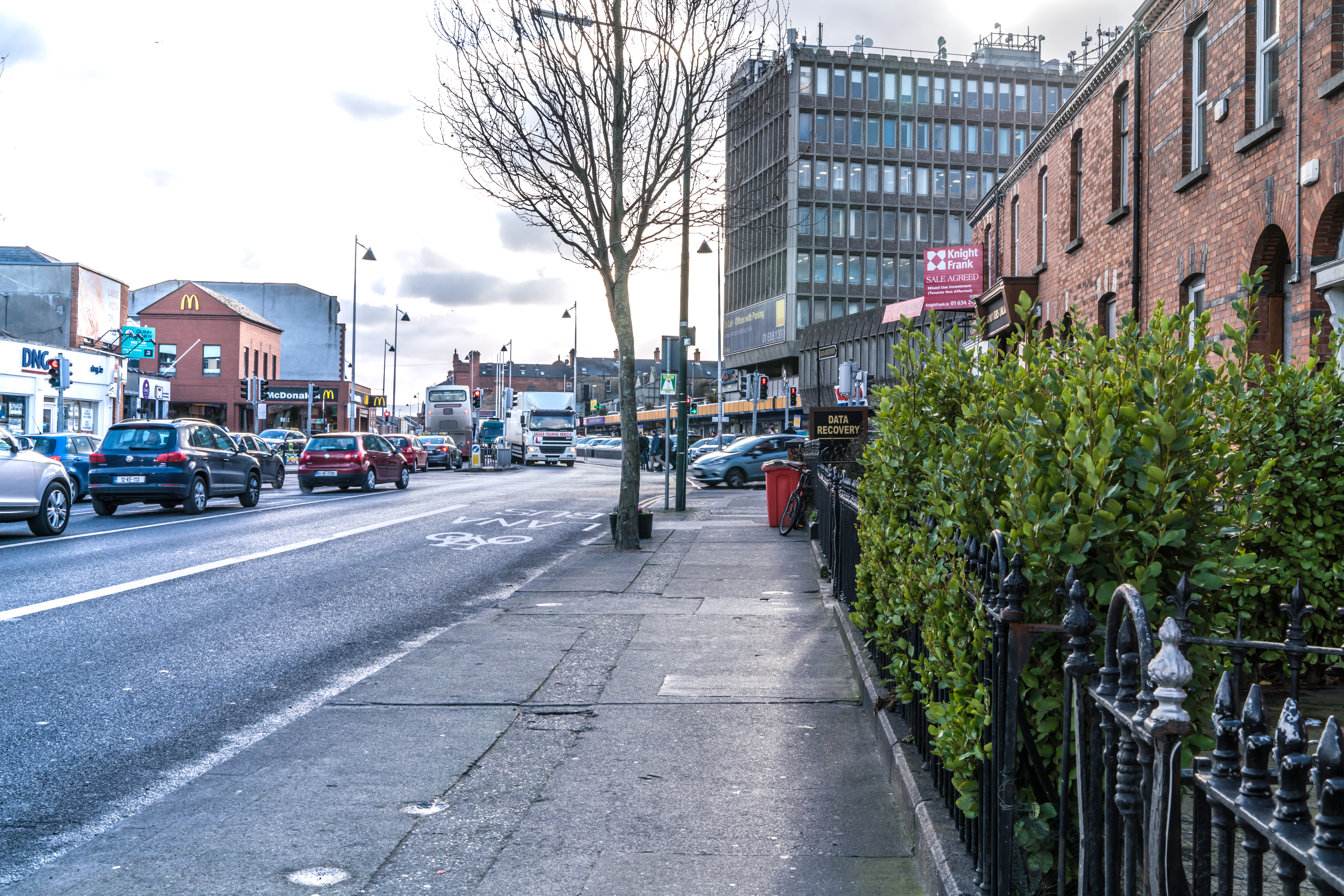
The predominantly commercial Phibsborough Road, Phibsborough

Phibsborough is located about 2 km north of the old city centre, in Dublin 7. It is bordered by Glasnevin to the north, Drumcondra to the east, Grangegorman and Cabra to the west and the King's Inns on Constitution Hill to the south. The busy commercial centre of Phibsborough is located around the crossroads of the Phibsborough and North Circular Road, commonly known as Doyle's Corner.

== Transport ==
=== Bus ===
Phibsborough is served by many Dublin Bus routes passing outbound to the north city suburbs: numbers 11, 11b, 23, 24, 38, 38a, 38b, 38d, 70n, 88n, 120, 122, F1, F2, F3, E1 and E2. Inbound services serve the city centre.

=== Luas ===
Phibsborough, Grangegorman and Broadstone both have stops on the Luas Green Line located along the former Midland Great Western Railway line. The Phibsborough stop is located at the railway cutting between the North Circular Road and the Cabra Road. It has lateral platforms. Access to the platform level is from both the North Circular and Cabra Roads via stairs and lifts from the new deck levels abutting the existing road overbridges. The Broadstone stop is located at Prebend Street and the Western Way. The Phibsboro stop serves the residential communities and facilitates interchange with bus services on the North Circular and Cabra Roads. The Broadstone stop serves the Mountjoy area and the newly built Technological University Dublin campus located at Grangegorman.

The Luas Cross City project has joined the Luas Red and Green lines with a line from Broombridge in North Dublin (interchange with the Irish Rail station) and St. Stephen's Green Green Line stop. Services began in December 2017.

== Amenities ==
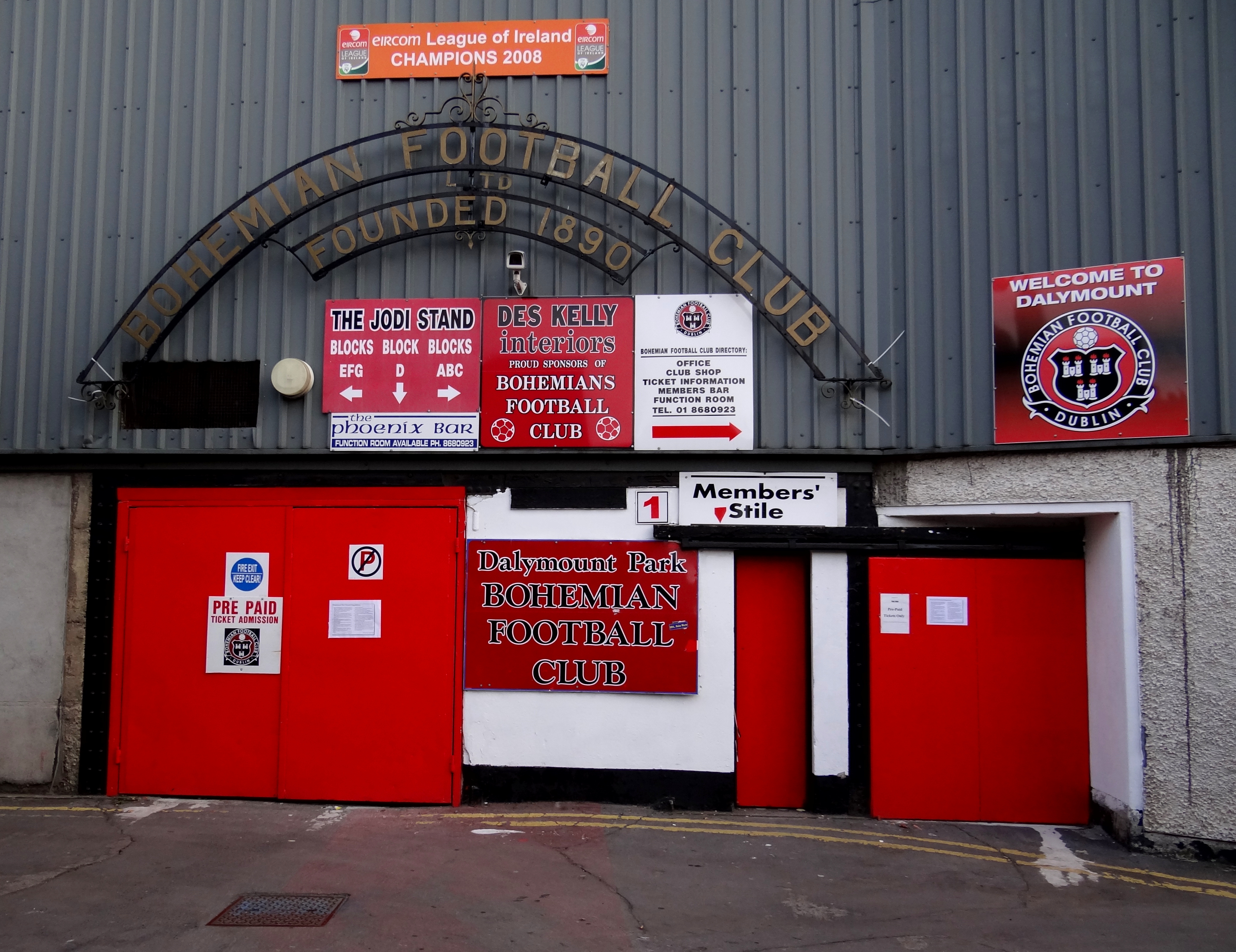
Bohemian FC, Dalymount Park

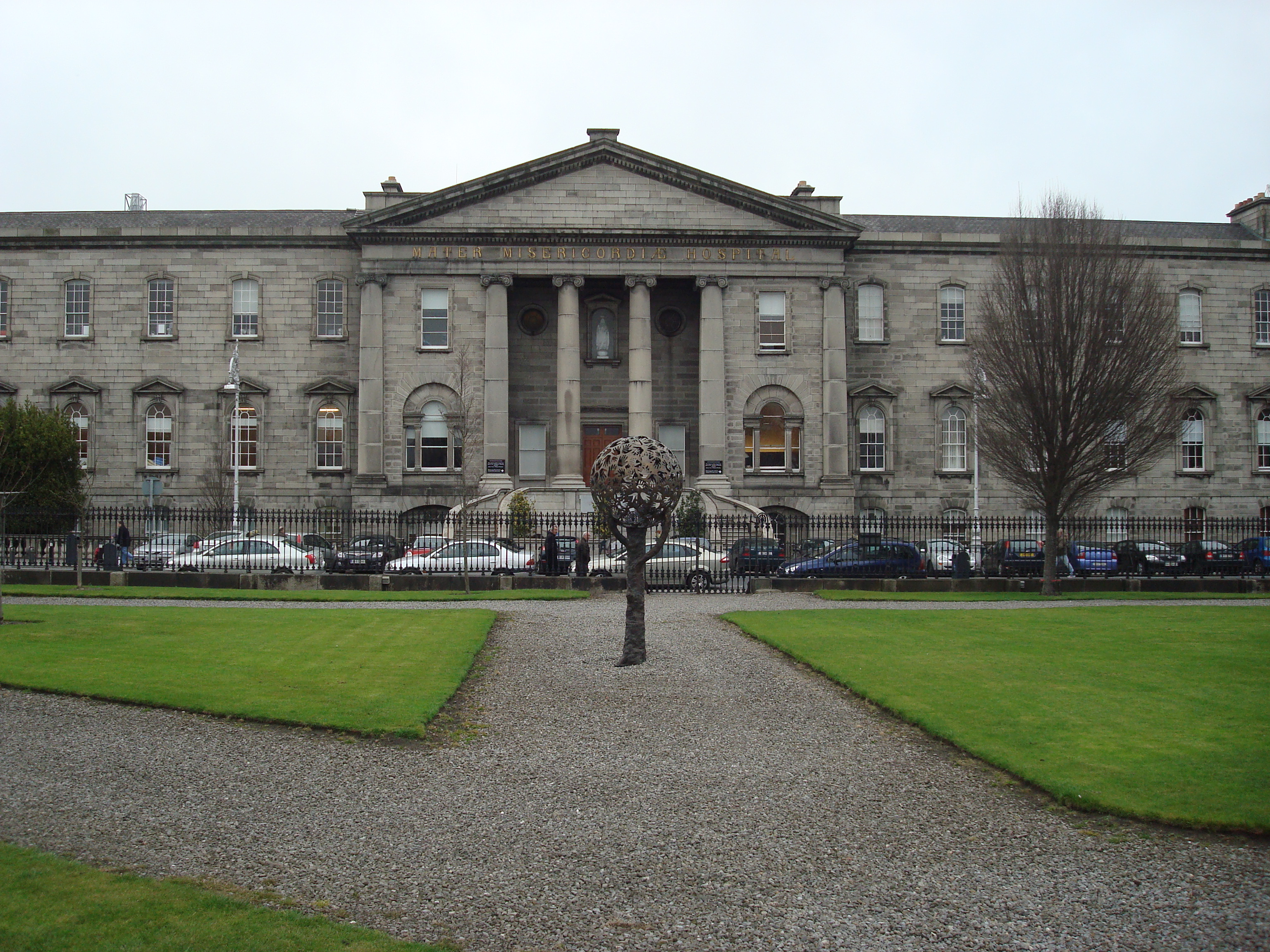
The Mater Hospital

The Royal Canal passes along the northern boundary, separating Phibsborough from Glasnevin. Below the fifth lock, east of Crossguns Bridge, the Broadstone Harbour city markets-bound main branch of the canal ran south, to the now paved-over harbour. The filled-in former mainline is now covered by a linear park and the adjacent road is called the Royal Canal Bank. It consists of a variety of homes from multiple periods, some dating from the 1750s. The canal's current mainline runs south-east to Spencer Dock at the North Wall. The "parkway" passes Mountjoy Gaol, under Blacqueire Bridge, along the high-banked eastern side of Phibsborough Road. Originally the Foster Aqueduct carried the mainline canal over the Phibsborough Road to the harbour terminus which sat directly opposite the King's Inns at Constitution Hill.

Blessington Street Basin formerly used to supply water to the city, and to Jameson and Powers distilleries, is located adjacent to the Royal Canal Bank road, it was supplied with water piped along the canal and has been a public park since its opening; it remains a haven for wildlife.

Dalymount Park, home of League of Ireland team Bohemian F.C., was the pre-Aviva Stadium venue for international association football and the renowned 'Dalymount Roar' was created here. The National Botanic Gardens are situated in nearby Glasnevin.

Phibsboro Boxing Club runs a gym on Royal Canal Bank, also Phibsboro Chess Club meet at Clareville Community Centre, Claremont Lawns, Glasnevin, Dublin,

A major teaching hospital, the Mater Misericordiae University Hospital, is both a local and national care centre. Adjacent is the Mater Private Hospital, and Temple Street Children's Hospital.

== Religion ==
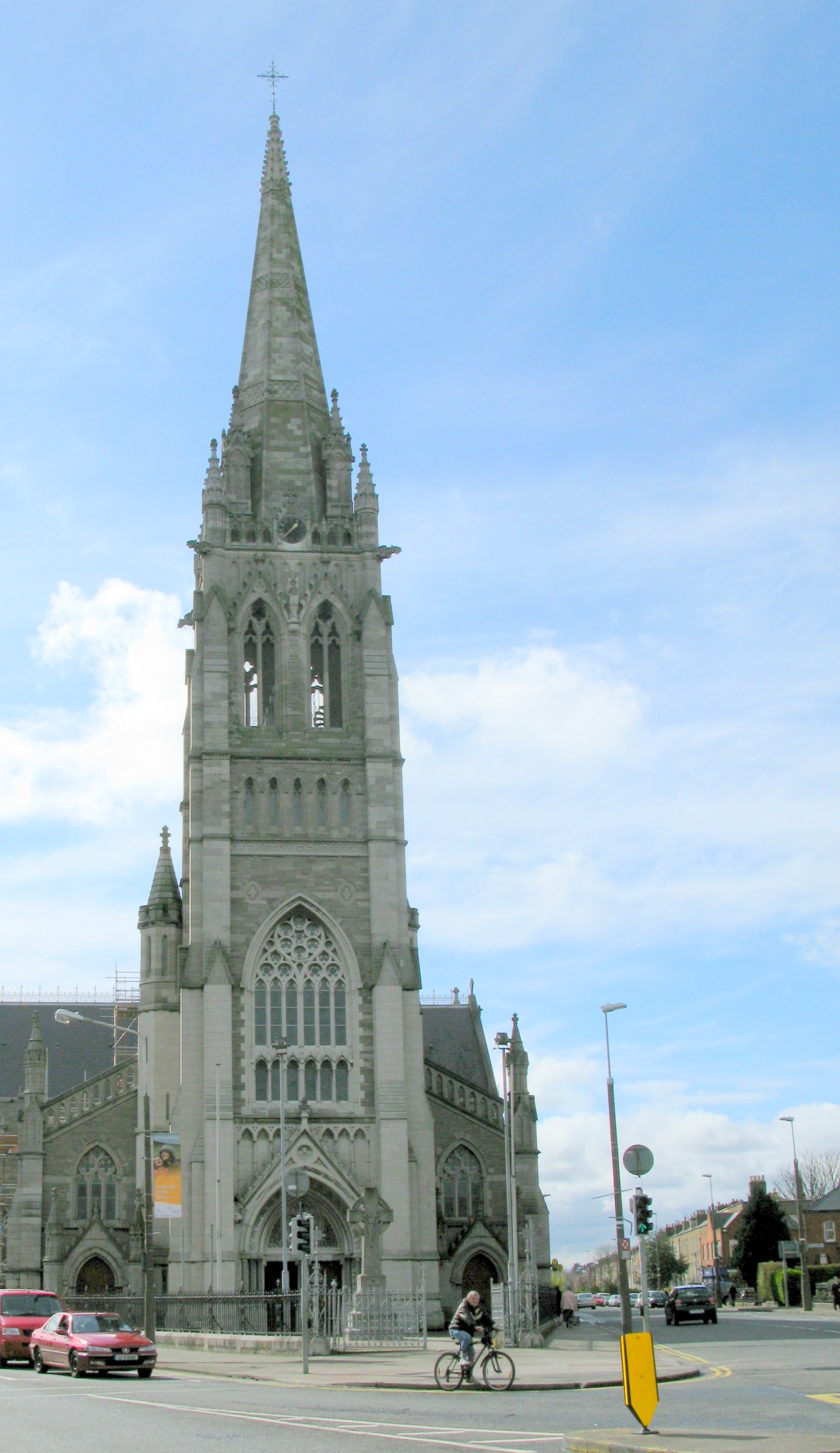
St. Peter's Church

Phibsborough is a parish in the Fingal South West deanery of the Roman Catholic Archdiocese of Dublin, served by the Church of St Peter. There is All Saints Parish Church (Church of Ireland), on Phibsborough Road. In 2017 the Romanian Orthodox Church opened its new church on Western Way, Broadstone, Phibsboro.

== History ==
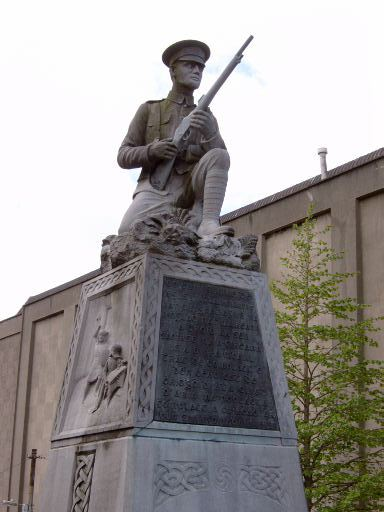
Memorial to the Irish Volunteers, 'C' Coy., by Leo Broe, at the junction of North Circular Road and Royal Canal Bank, a former spur of the Royal Canal

=== Toponymy and early history ===
The original Irish language name, Glas Mochonóg, means Monck's Green, which evolved to the variants Manogue and Minogue, and anglicised as Monck. This family held the local demesne at Grangegorman following intermarriage with the Stanley family, becoming Stanley Monck. The Green served as a playfield and parade ground was bisected by the main north road which ran from the foot of the Old Bridge of Dublin. Lying low between the stepping stone crossing of the Bradogue river (which now flows underground) is a common called the Glasminogue. Between the Broadstone and the village of Baile Phib at Monck Place, it often flooded and turned into a quagmire.

The etymology of the name Phibsborough (Broadstone) 1792 [spelt Phippsborough] is from a Lincolnshire family who settled as landowners in the area in the mid-17th century, the first being a Richard Phipps (of Kilmainham), who died in 1629 and was buried at St James's. [Pedigree of Phipps or Phibbs family, – Sligo, 1890.]

=== Later history ===
This area was part of the Grangegorman estate.

The Broadstone area underwent significant urban development in the early nineteenth century in order to fulfil the commercial and residential needs of the Royal Canal Company headquarters and Harbour Terminus operation. The later onset of John S. Mulvaney's Midland Great Western Railway and the railway engineering works brought further development to North Circular Road intersection and east to Blessington Street. The natural expansion of the city saw the development move north with residential housing reaching Phibsborough, Glasnevin, and Phoenix Park to the northwest.

A freestanding Church of Ireland church was built in 1828, comprising a four-bay nave, two-bay chancel to the east added in 1856, single-bay baptistry to west elevation, and porch to south elevation added in 1887, four-bay full-height north aisle added in 1887, with entrance porch.

St. Peter's Catholic Church and schools date from 1862. The construction of the church was controversial, resulting in a long and costly lawsuit. This dispute between the architect and builder ended in the courts and required the intervention of the Roman Catholic Archbishop of Dublin. All Saints Church of Ireland Parish Church, Phibsborough Road, was completed in 1904. The renowned Tractarian, Dr Maturin, was rector for many years, establishing a High Church tradition of worship. The interior was restored in recent years, having suffered fire damage in 1968.

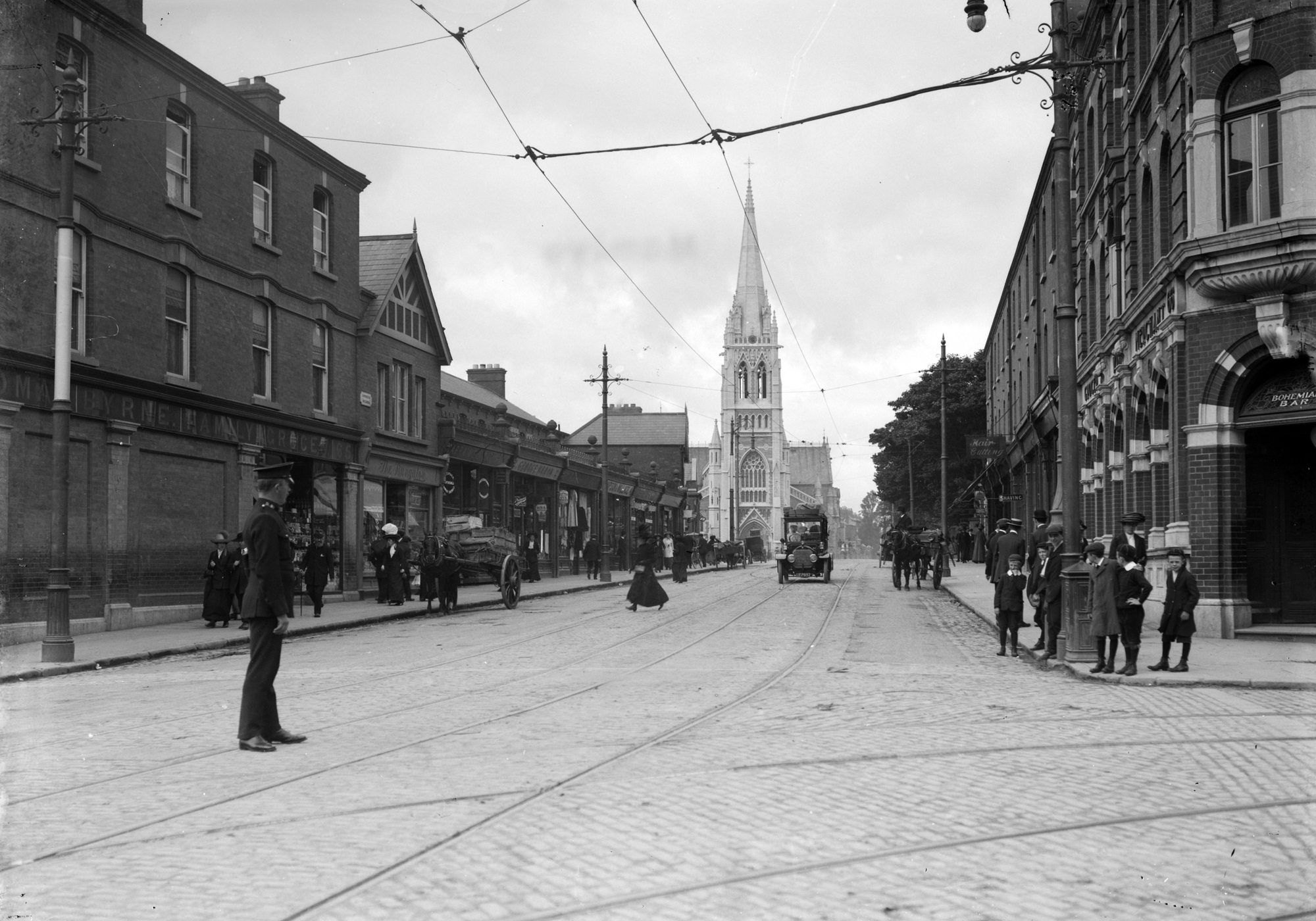
The Dublin Metropolitan Police on duty with a policeman about to check an approaching car in the 1910s in Phibsborough

=== 20th century ===
In 1900 a Baptist church was built on the North Circular Road, a red-bricked building, it was sold in the 1990s and developed into offices.

At the time of the Easter Rising, the de Valera family home was at 34, Munster Street. Phibsborough has a number of memorials including one to Sean Healy, a 15-year-old member of the Fianna. Healy was one of two Phibsborough Road residents killed during the Easter Rising, the other being James Kelly (18). Local participants in the War of Independence include Harry Boland who was born in Phibsborough and grew up there. His friend Dick McKee was born at Phibsborough Road. One of The Forgotten Ten, Bernard Ryan, lived here until his execution in Mountjoy Jail. The sculpture by Leo Broe at Royal Canal Bank was commissioned in memory of the local contingent of Irish Volunteers.

Broadstone Station was closed in 1937. These buildings constituted the Dublin Terminus, headquarters, and railworks of the Midland Great Western Railway and the Royal Canal Company. They now serve as the administrative centre and district bus garage for Bus Éireann and Dublin Bus. The impressive nineteenth-century main building, fronted by a classical Egyptian-style facade, and Corinthian columnar service access is currently an eyesore. It awaits redevelopment as part of a planned regeneration of the area.

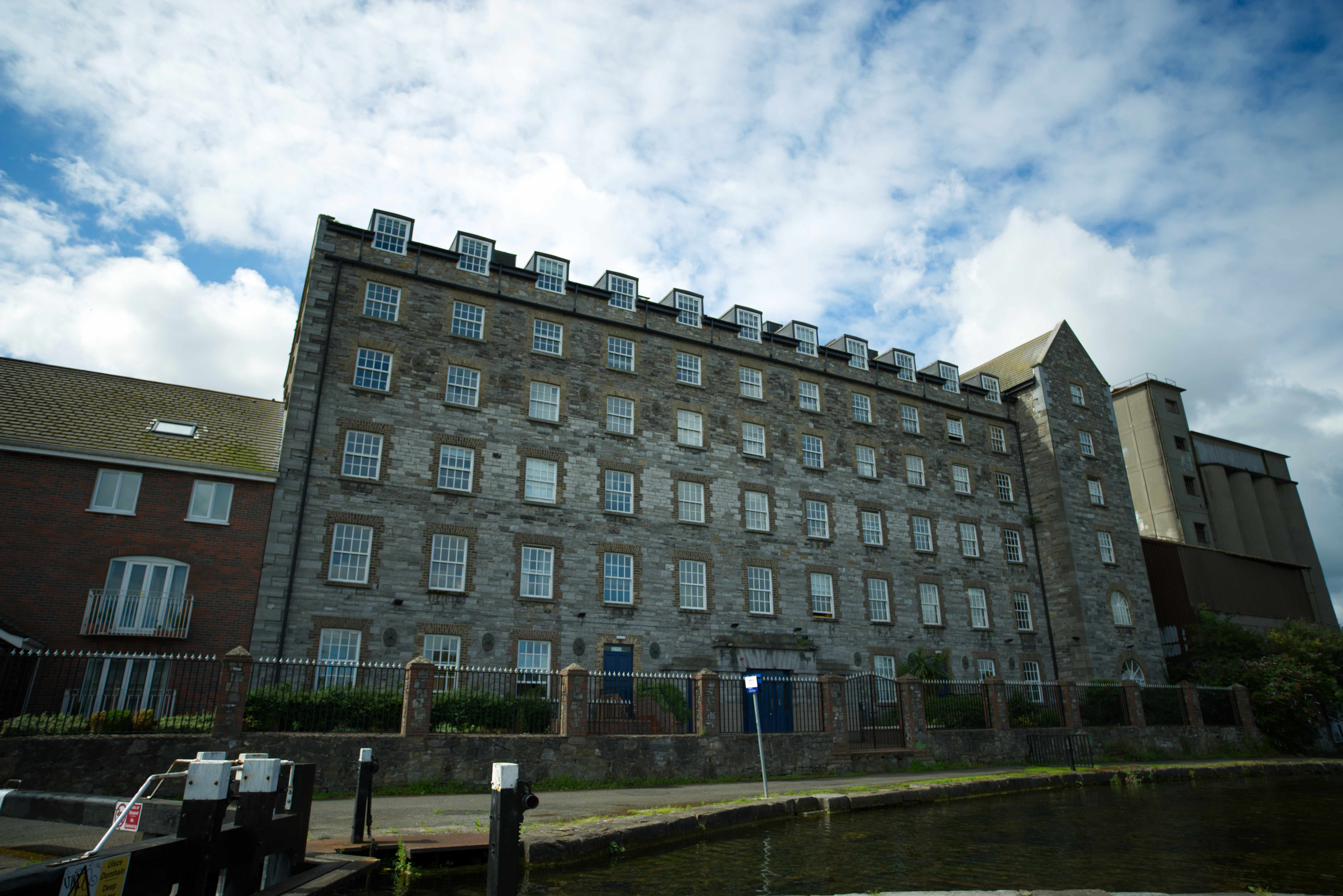
The Site of The Former Flour Mills along the Royal Canal

There was a flour mill in Phibsbororough. The building is now apartments. The site was originally Mallet's Iron Mill before becoming the North City Flour Mill in the 1860s. The mill changed hands in 1881, purchased by the Murtagh Brothers, operating under the trade name of Dublin North Milling Company. This company was taken over by Ranks. The mill closed in the 1983.

During his early years, author James Joyce and his family lived at No. 7, St. Peter's Road.

In silence they drove along Phibsborough Road. An empty hearse trotted by, coming from the cemetery: looks relieved.
Crossguns bridge: the Royal canal.
Water rushed roaring through the sluices. A man stood on his dropping barge, between clamps of turf. On the towpath by the lock a slacktethered horse.
Aboard of the Bugabu.

— Ulysses, James Joyce

Glasmanogue was the name of a former common along the Phibsborough Road, north of the culverted Bradogue River.

==== Late 20th century ====
Since the post-war expansion of Dublin city, Phibsborough along with Glasnevin and Drumcondra provided amenities to the north city business district in the way that Ranelagh, Rathmines and Harold's Cross did to the south city. The convenient location, combined with easy access and good public transport facilities, led to the conversion of larger homes into bedsitter flats. The pace of economic advancement during the Celtic Tiger decade saw an increased demand for new flats and townhouse projects. This housing wave provided an opportunity for the re-conversion of historic properties back to family homes. Much the same has occurred on the city's south side. In addition, many existing semi-derelict properties and architectural curiosities were converted into modern apartments within their historic shells. Many Victorian and Edwardian facades were restored. The restored terraces of pink, biscuit and red-brick houses complement the converted historic churches, banks and offices. There are a number of Victorian-era pubs in the area.

The Dublin City Council Local Area Plan for Phibsborough has been subject to revision and delays, despite its designation as a Prime Urban Centre.

Developers have secured planning permission to upgrade the existing Phibsboro Shopping Centre. Built in 1969 and designed by David Keane with Leslie Rebanks a town centre design expert from Toronto as a consultant, the shopping centre is one of the largest and most imposing buildings in the area. The tower is 100 feet high, and the whole complex replaced a terrace of 18 cottages. The site was developed by Galen Weston. It was officially opened by Noel Lemass on 24 October 1969. The centre was the first combination of a shopping centre with offices built in Ireland. It was a cause of controversy from the outset among architects, the public, and the press in terms of its architectural design and the circumstances of its passage through the planning process. It was the subject of Forgotten Frontier: A Critical Appraisal of the Phibsboro Shopping Centre, published by Phibsboro Press in 2017, a zine featuring photographs, a research essay, and illustrations.

With a claim to being the longest-established football club in the city, the home ground of Bohemian FC is located on the west side of the shopping centre at Dalymount Park. The club is colloquially known as 'Bohs' and dates from 1890. In 2016, it was reported that Dublin City Council had announced long-awaited development plans for Dalymount Park to dramatically improve the stadium facilities and widen its use and accessibility.

The government announced plans to close the inadequate facilities at Mountjoy Gaol and transfer the operations to Thornhill, a new prison in Fingal County; this plan did not progress.

== Music, arts, and media ==
The first Phibsborough community arts festival, Phizzfest, took place from 9 to 12 September 2010. Writers who took part included Anne Enright and Dermot Bolger.

Two of the city's early 20th-century suburban cinemas were located relatively close to one another in Phibsborough. The Bohemian Picture Theatre (aka Palace) was a purpose-built theatre that operated from 1914 until 1974 at 154/5 Phibsborough Road. The building was demolished in the 1990s. At 376 North Circular Road (then 36 Madras Place), the Phibsborough Picture House also opened in May 1914. It underwent several enlargements of its screen and auditorium to increase capacity and access distribution until a major re-fit and re-launch as the State cinema in 1953 meant the new building became one of the world's first cinemas specifically designed to show CinemaScope films. The building was used for other purposes afterwards, eventually housing a discount carpet showroom in its largest section, which led to changes to the interior, although the exterior remains largely unchanged.

The streets around the crossroads where the North Circular and Phibsborough roads intersect are the subject of important social history photographs within the Lawrence and Eason collections held at the National Photographic Archive (part of the National Library of Ireland) that have been digitised and made accessible as high-resolution scans online.

== Notable residents ==
- Cecil Frances Alexander, hymn composer, born on Eccles Street
- Ernest Blythe, Irish Minister for Finance, (1922–1932)
- Seóirse Bodley, composer and arranger
- Harry Boland, republican revolutionary and member of the First Dáil
- Desmond Connell, Cardinal Archbishop of Dublin
- Michael Gambon, actor
- Philip Greene, RTÉ sports broadcaster
- James Joyce, author, lived at 5 St. Peter's Road (formerly St. Peter's Terrace)
- Cathal Mac Coille, RTÉ journalist and broadcaster
- Dick McKee, a republican revolutionary
- Dame Iris Murdoch, author and philosopher, born at Blessington Street, 1919
- Bernard Ryan, a republican revolutionary
- Éamon de Valera, former Taoiseach and President of Ireland
