= North Circular Road, Dublin =

Road in Ireland

Coordinates: 53°21′36″N 6°15′47″W

R101 road
- Bóthar R101
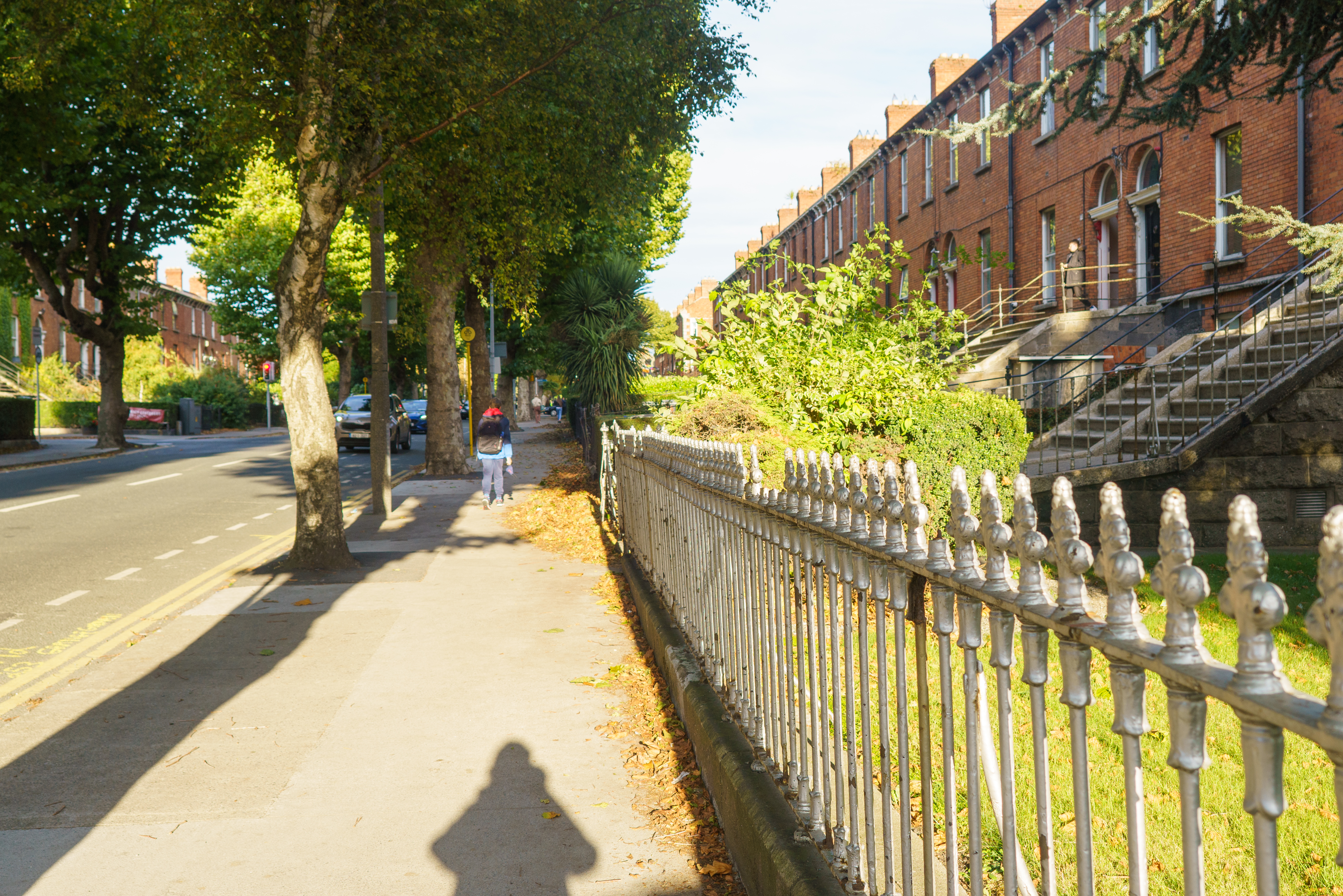
- A section of the North Circular Road, near Phibsborough

Route information
- Length: 5.6 km (3.5 mi)
- Existed: 1763–present

Location
- Country: Ireland

Highway system
- Roads in Ireland; Motorways; Primary; Secondary; Regional

The North Circular Road (Irish: An Cuarbhóthar Thuaidh), designated as the R101 regional road, is an important thoroughfare on the northside of Dublin, in Ireland. It is the northside equivalent of the South Circular Road.

== Location ==
Circular Road Act 1777
- Act of Parliament
- Parliament of Ireland
- Long title: An Act for making and keeping in repair a circular road round the city of Dublin.
- Citation: 17 & 18 Geo. 3. c. 10 (I)
- Territorial extent: Ireland

Dates
- Royal assent: 11 June 1778
- Commencement: 11 June 1778

The regional road was constructed as the northern boundary of the city, and was proposed in an Act, along with the South Circular Road, in 1777. In 1776, it was announced that "the Commissioners for continuing the circular road have marked out its course from Island Bridge to the North Wall, where it will conclude with a horse ferry".

The road is considered as a marker to separate the city centre from the inner suburbs, and runs from the Phoenix Park in the west through Phibsboro, to North Wall in the east. A number of important institutions are located along the road, including the Mater Hospital, Dalymount Park and Mountjoy Prison, and both Croke Park and St. Brendan's Hospital are nearby. The majority of the original, large Victorian red brick houses have been converted into flats or apartments.

The R101 and the NCR overlap for most of their lengths, and the entire NCR forms a section of the R101. In the west the R101 connects the NCR to Parkgate Street via the short Infirmary Road ; at the eastern end the R101 becomes Portland Row after the junction with Summerhill. It continues the northern loop through Saville Place , then turns east for its final kilometre via Sheriff Street (Upper) before terminating at North Wall Road (the R131).

The official description of the R101 from the Roads Act 1993 (Classification of Regional Roads) Order 2012 reads:

R101: North Circular Road, Dublin

Between its junction with R109 at Parkgate Street and its junction with R147 at Dalymount via Infirmary Road and North Circular Road all in the city of Dublin

and

between its junction with R135 at Berkeley Road and its junction with R131 at East Wall Road via North Circular Road, Portland Row, Seville Place, Sheriff Street Lower and Sheriff Street Upper all in the city of Dublin.

== Buildings ==
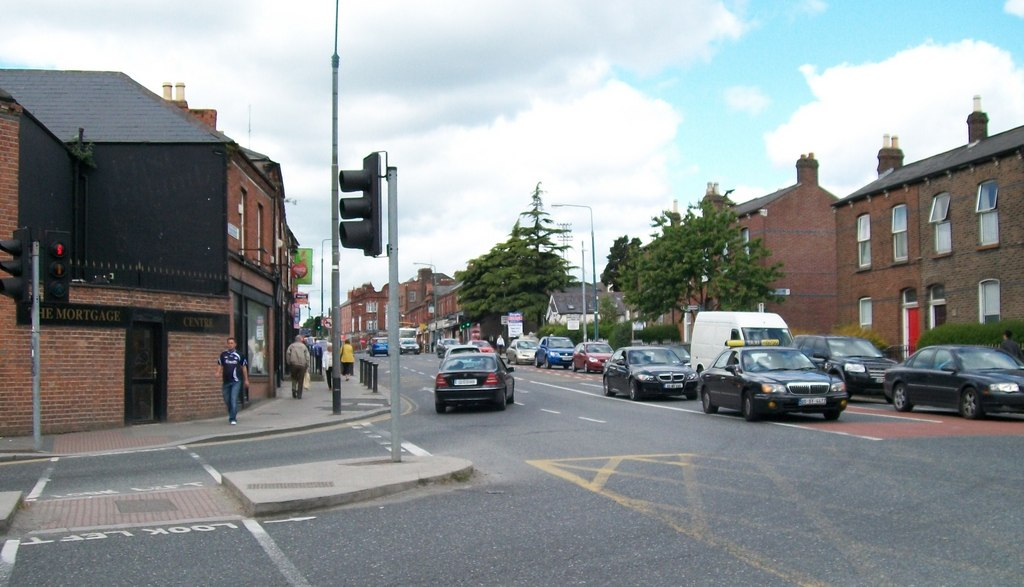
Dublin's North Circular Road from the corner of Berkeley Road

At Hanlon's Corner, there is one of the largest office blocks built in Dublin in the 20th century, Park House. Built on the site of the Kirwan House orphanage, the block is 7 storeys over a raised basement car park. It was originally planned to be a hotel but was abandoned in 1969, with the almost completed reinforced concrete structure converted to office use. This was completed in 1973. It was leased to a number of tenants, including the Department of Justice, Special Olympics Ireland, the Northern Area Health Board and the Mirror Group. In 2017, the buildings was purchased by the Technological University Dublin to incorporate into the Grangegorman campus.

== See also ==
- Regional road (Ireland)
- Roads in Ireland
- List of streets and squares in Dublin

== Sources ==
- McDonald, Frank (1985). The Destruction of Dublin. Gill and MacMillan. ISBN 0-7171-1386-8.
- Simms, Dr. J. G. (1 December 1977). "Dublin in 1776". Dublin Historical Record. 31 (1). Dublin: Old Dublin Society: 2–13. JSTOR 30104025.
