= R805 road (Ireland) =

Road in Ireland

R805 road
- Bóthar R805
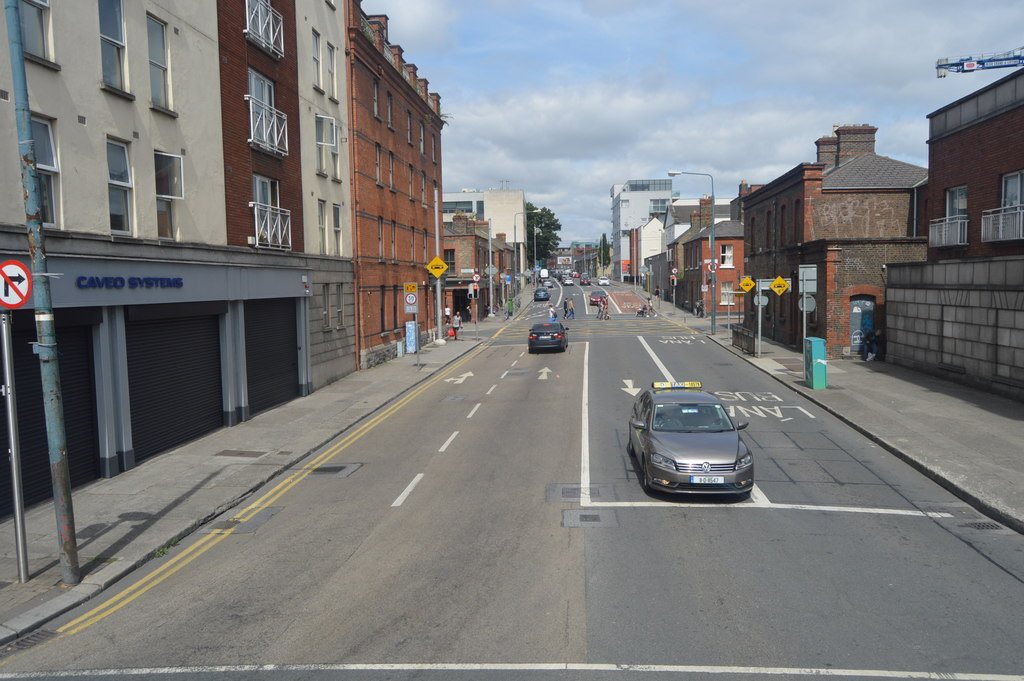
- Blackhall Place, on the R805

Location
- Country: Ireland
- Primary destinations: Dublin

Highway system
- Roads in Ireland; Motorways; Primary; Secondary; Regional

The R805 road is a regional road in Dublin, Ireland.

The official definition of the R805 from the Roads Act 1993 (Classification of Regional Roads) Order 2012 states:

R805: Ellis Quay - Finglas, Dublin

Between its junction with R148 at Ellis Quay and its junction with R102 at River Road via Blackhall Place (and via Hendrick Street), Stoneybatter, Manor Street, Prussia Street, Old Cabra Road and Ratoath Road all in the city of Dublin.

In February 2015, a realignment of the road at Cabra was opened, which crosses the Royal Canal and the Dublin–Sligo railway line via a new bridge, instead of the previous narrow humpbacked and zig-zagged Reilly's Bridge and level crossing, respectively.

== See also ==
- Roads in Ireland
- Regional road
