= South Circular Road, Dublin =

Street in Dublin, Ireland

Coordinates: 53°19′54″N 6°16′40″W

R811 road
- Bóthar R811
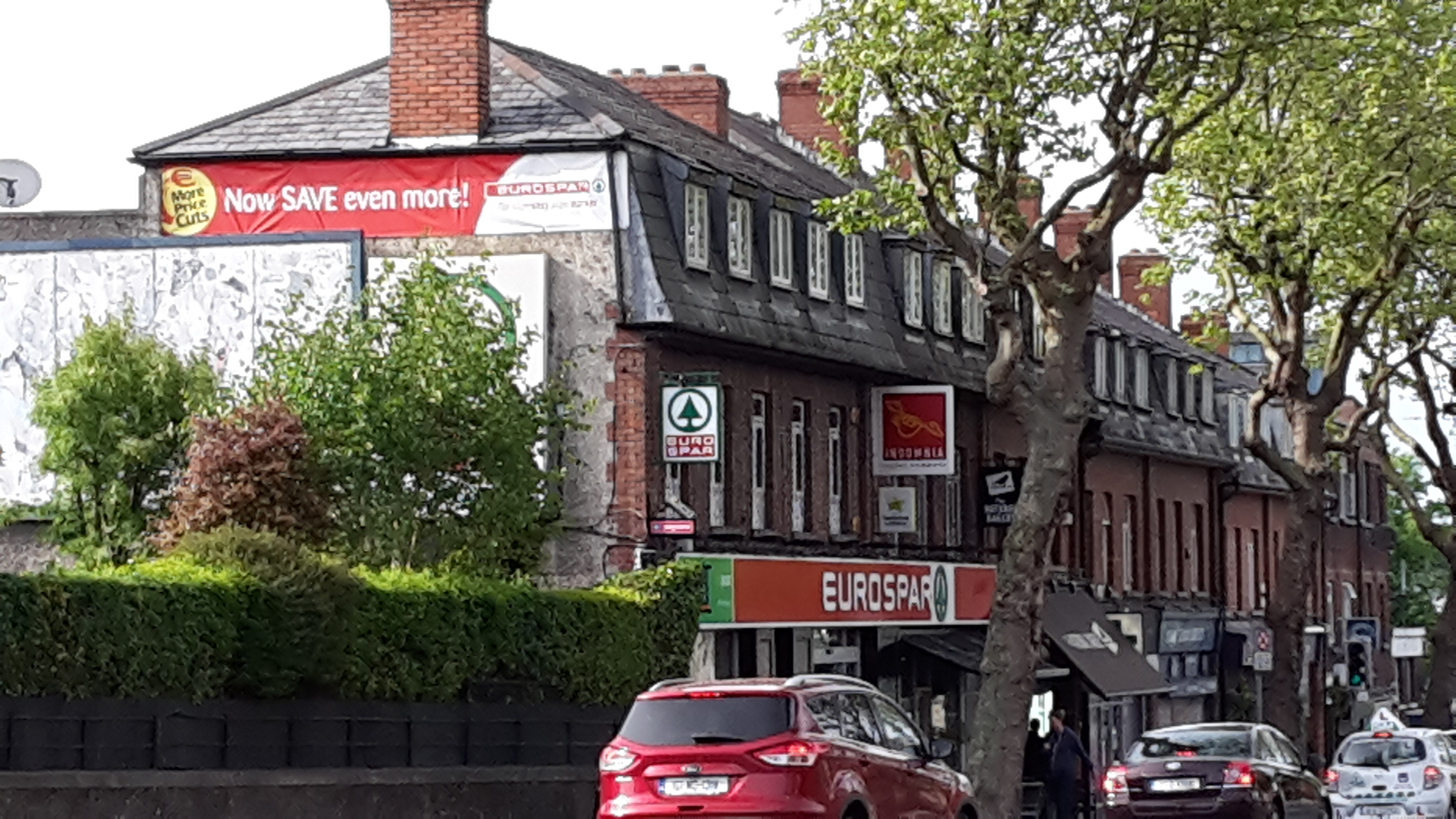
- A section of Dublin's South Circular Road in Dublin 8.

Location
- Country: Ireland

Highway system
- Roads in Ireland; Motorways; Primary; Secondary; Regional

The South Circular Road (Irish: An Cuarbhóthar Theas), designated as the R811 regional road, is a road in Dublin, Ireland. One of the longest in the city, it runs from Islandbridge in the west, through Rialto and Dolphin's Barn to Portobello, near the centre. It runs mainly through residential areas and is used by numerous bus routes. It is the southside equivalent of the North Circular Road.

== History ==
The street was started in 1763, however until the early 19th century most of the area covered by the road was countryside. The site of Griffith Barracks was originally known as Grimswoods Nurseries. The first buildings on the site were those of a Remand Prison or Bridewell begun in 1813 by the architect Francis Johnston. It was then known as Richmond Gaol and later became Wellington Barracks. Now Griffith Barracks are part of Ireland's largest private college, Griffith College. Along with the North Circular Road, it runs almost parallel with the two canals, and both roads were built as a relief scheme to provide employment.

Residential development of the South Circular Road began in earnest at Portobello around 1860 when estates such as Emorville and Portabello Gardens were put up for sale as development land. It quickly continued along the length of the road into the 1890s.

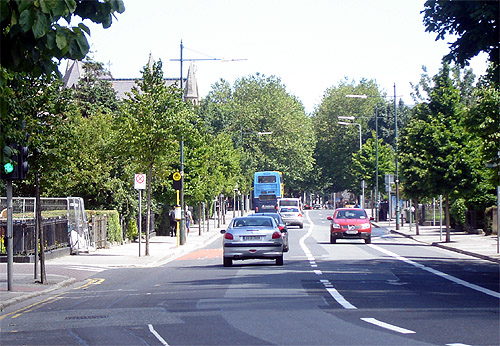
A section of the South Circular Road in Portobello, looking towards Harrington Street

Harrington Street (St. Kevin's) Catholic church was completed in 1871, and the Church of Ireland St. Kevin's in 1883. The Donore Presbyterian Church (now the Dublin Mosque) was built in 1884 (in the 1860s).

In 1887 Richmond Gaol was transferred to the War Department and became Wellington Barracks.

The Dublin tramways system was extended into the South Circular Road in February 1896 when a line was built from Leonard's Corner to Dolphins Barn. It was electrified in December 1899 and extended to Rialto in May 1905.

The first Jews fleeing conditions in Lithuania (then part of the Russian Empire) arrived in the early 1870s and eventually settled off Lower Clanbrassil Street. In the following decades, many of them settled along the South Circular Road, both sides of Leonard's Corner, and in the side streets off it. There was a Jewish dairy opposite what was then Wellington Barracks.

On 1 July 1943, the South Circular Road was the scene of a robbery by the IRA, then hard-pressed by the Irish Government of Éamon de Valera due to the ongoing war. Charlie Kerins, IRA Chief of Staff at the time, and his fellow militants Archie Doyle and Jackie Griffith arrived on bikes at the gates of Player Wills factory on the South Circular Road. With scarves around their faces, they stopped at gunpoint the van with some £5,000 for wages, and drove away with the van and the money, which was used to finance the organization's operations.

In 1939 part of the Griffith Barracks was leased to the Irish Athletic Boxing Association as the site for the National Boxing Stadium which was opened by Frank Aiken.

== Literary allusion ==
In the "Ithaca" chapter of James Joyce's novel Ulysses, the question is posed:

"Had Bloom discussed similar subjects during nocturnal perambulations in the past?"

In the short story "Two Gallants" from Joyce's collection Dubliners, Corley speaks of previously picking up girls there.

In 1884 with Owen Goldberg and Cecil Turnbull at night on public thoroughfares between Longwood Avenue and Leonard's corner and Leonard's corner and Synge Street and Synge Street and Bloomfield Avenue." (i.e., they walked along South Circular Road, Portobello).
