= IAFL-2 =

Defunct Irish American football league

Irish American Football League-2 (IAFL-2)
- Sport: American football
- Founded: 2014
- Folded: 2023
- No. of teams: 4 (2023 season)
- Country: Republic of Ireland, Northern Ireland
- Website: http://www.americanfootball.ie/

IAFL-2 was an American football league in Ireland that constituted the third tier of the Irish American Football League. The league, which was founded in 2014, was won by the Tyrone Titans in its inaugural year. Like the Premier League (tier 1) and IAFL-1 (tier 2), the league was contested by teams from both the Republic of Ireland and Northern Ireland. The winner of the IAFL-2 Conference was promoted to Division 1. After the rebranding of the IAFL to American Football Ireland (AFI) in 2020, the division was known as AFI Division 2. As part of a restructuring of the AFI league format, IAFL-2 was eliminated beginning with the 2024 season, and its teams were merged into Division 1.

== History ==
The IAFL-2 was created in 2014 for newer clubs entering the sport to gain experience before moving on to the IAFL-1 Conference. The league first operated from 2014 to 2017 before being merged with IAFL-1 in 2018, and being reinstated in 2019. After two seasons in which all AFI play was suspended in 2020 and 2021 in response to the COVID-19 pandemic, the third tier returned briefly as AFI Division 2 from 2022 to 2023 before being merged into Division 1 in 2024.

Year	Winner	Runner up	IAFL-2 Bowl score
2014	Tyrone Titans	Dundalk Mavericks	20-7
2015	Belfast Trojans 2nds	South Kildare Soldiers	48-0
2016	Donegal/Derry Vipers	Wexford Eagles	33-29
2017	Meath Bulldogs	Antrim Jets	40-0
2019	Cill Dara Crusaders	Meath Bulldogs	34-26
2022	Antrim Jets	Louth Mavericks	22-0
2023	Wexford Eagles	Causeway Giants	35-8
