= Cabra Luas stop =

Tram stop in Dublin, Ireland

Cabra Cabrach
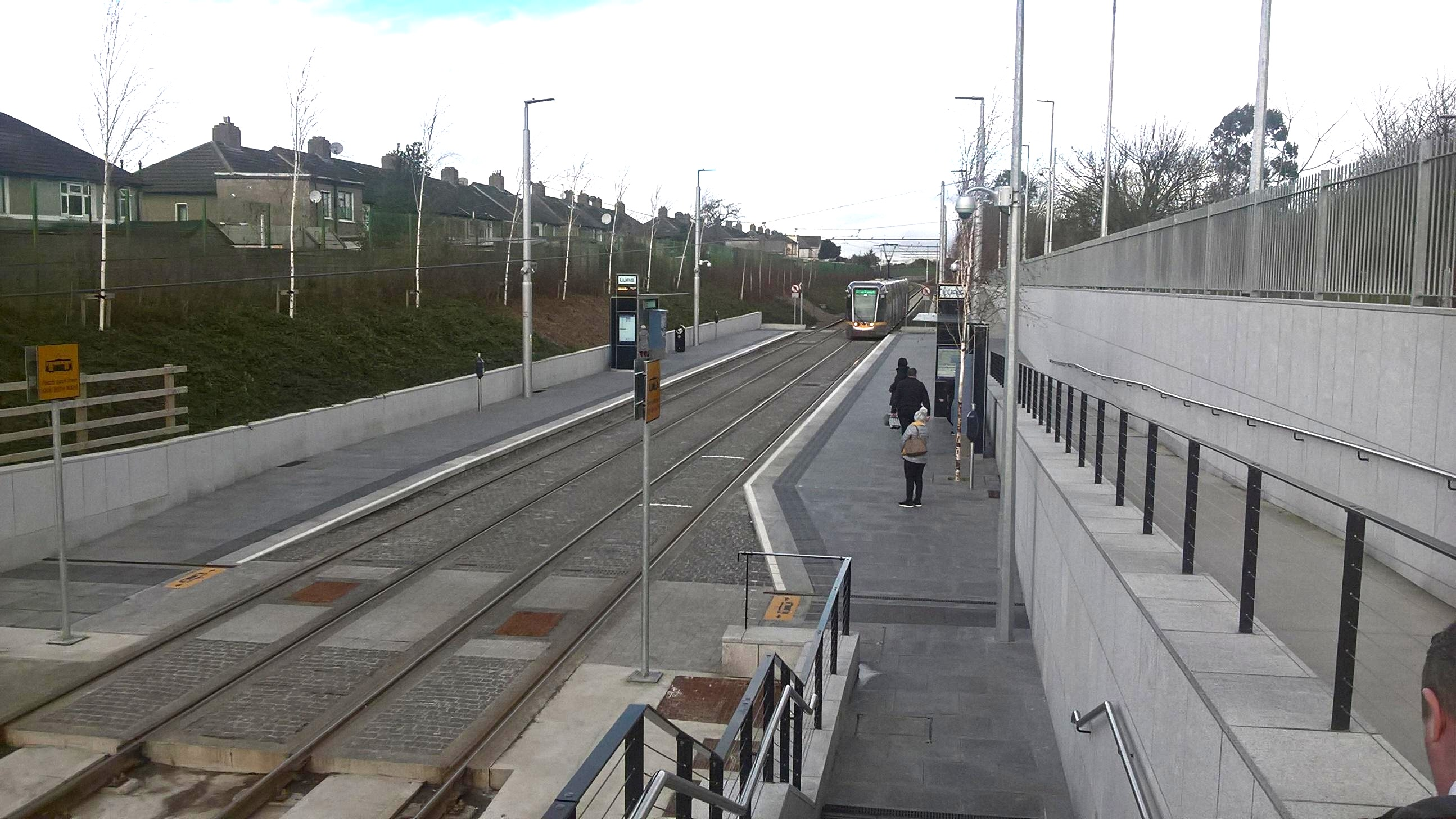
- A southbound tram arriving at Cabra

General information
- Location: Connaught Street/Fassaugh Road; Cabra, Dublin; Ireland
- Coordinates: 53°21′52″N 6°16′55″W
- Owner: Transport Infrastructure Ireland
- Operator: Transdev (as Luas)
- Line: Green
- Platforms: 2

Construction
- Structure type: At-grade

Other information
- Fare zone: Green 1

Key dates
- 9 December 2017: Stop opened
Location
- Location within Dublin

Cabra (Irish: Cabrach) is a stop on the Luas light-rail tram system in Dublin, Ireland. It opened in 2017 as a stop on Luas Cross City, an extension of the Green Line through the city centre from St. Stephen's Green to Broombridge.

The stop provides access to the neighbourhood of Cabra and the National Botanic Gardens.

== Location ==
Cabra Luas stop is located at the northern end of the Broadstone railway cutting, immediately to the north of Connaught Street, which crosses the line on the Liam Whelan bridge, which was rebuilt as part of the construction of the stop. The main entrance is a long ramp leading from the eastern side of the bridge to the middle of the southbound platform (there are also stairs which lead from the middle of the ramp to the end of the platform). A second entrance consists of a pathway leading from the northern end of the stop to the nearby Mount Bernard Park.

The cutting is somewhat wider than the stop itself, meaning that there is some leftover space behind the northbound platform. Saplings have been planted in this area in an attempt to reduce the Luas's carbon footprint. Saplings have also been planted on the southbound platform.

== Services ==
Trams stop at the stop coming from either end every 10 minutes.

Preceding station	Luas	Following station
Broombridge; Terminus	Green Line	Phibsborough towards Sandyford or Brides Glen
