= American Football Ireland =

American football league in Ireland

- Sport: American football
- Founded: 1984; 42 years ago in Dublin, Ireland
- First season: 1986; 40 years ago
- No. of teams: 16
- Country: Republic of Ireland; Northern Ireland
- Most recent champion: Louth Mavericks (2026)
- Most titles: Dublin Rebels (10 titles)
- Website: www.americanfootball.ie

American Football Ireland (AFI) is the national governing body for American football on the island of Ireland, with teams across both the Republic of Ireland and Northern Ireland. Founded in 1984, it is entirely run by volunteers and played by amateurs. The senior men's full-contact league currently consists of a two-division promotion and relegation system with 8 teams in each division, with the Premier Division playoff champions being awarded the Shamrock Bowl. AFI also organizes developmental youth leagues, co-ed and women's flag football competitions, as well as overseeing the Irish Wolfhounds national team which competes in IFAF competitions.

== History ==
=== Background ===
American football was first played on the island of Ireland in the 1940s by United States servicemen stationed in Northern Ireland during World War II, with the first game being played in Belfast at Ravenhill Stadium in 1942 between teams representing service and artillery units of the United States Army before an audience of more than 8000, mostly consisting of U.S. servicemen. The first unofficial match of American football featuring local players occurred in Banbridge in 1983, and the first flag football match featuring local teams took place two years later in Omagh between teams called the Tyrone Tornadoes and Coleraine Chieftains.

=== 1980s and 1990s ===
American Football Ireland (AFI) traces its origins to the 1980s. The league was founded in 1986 as the Irish American Football League (IAFL), initially featuring a five team arrangement including the Dublin Celts, Coleraine Chieftains, Belfast Blitzers, Carrickfergus Cougars and Craigavon Cowboys. The first Shamrock Bowl was played in 1986 between the Craigavon Cowboys and the Dublin Celts, with the Cowboys winning 6–2 in Dublin. As of early 1987 the league featured 8 teams, and the IAFL briefly explored a combined league with teams in England, Scotland, and Wales in 1989 before returning to an Ireland-only league for 1991 as the American Football Association of Ireland. The Celts dominated the Irish scene in the late 1980s and early 1990s, winning four national titles, but enthusiasm for the league waned as the decade went on.

=== 2000s ===
After a decline in the 1990s leading to a one-year hiatus in 2000, organised American football in Ireland was revived in 2001 with a new four-team league called the Irish American Football Association (IAFA), featuring the Carrickfergus Knights, Dublin Dragons, Dublin Rebels, and UL Vikings. The league's reinstatement of the Shamrock Bowl resulted in the Dublin Rebels winning Shamrock Bowl XV, defeating the Knights 28–7 in Carrickfergus, followed by the Knights winning Shamrock Bowl XVI over the UL Vikings. That season also saw international success when the Dublin Rebels won the Charleroi Trophy in Belgium, defeating teams from France and Belgium. The 2003 season marked further expansion with the addition of the Cork Admirals, Belfast Bulls, and the returning Craigavon Cowboys, bringing the total to seven teams. The league was divided into two divisions to accommodate newer teams. The Rebels defended their Charleroi Trophy title and went on to win Shamrock Bowl XVII, beating the Knights 24–12 at Suttonians RFC in Dublin. The game drew some media attention, with highlights broadcast on TV3 and Sky Sports. The 2004 and 2005 seasons featured six teams and over 300 registered players, and the 2006 season added the DCU Saints and Dublin Marshals, raising the total to eight teams. The league expanded again in 2007, including the addition of the Belfast Trojans. In 2008, the league added a developmental league called DV8, featuring 8-on-8 play instead of the more conventional 11-a-side teams seen in the upper tiers. The latter half of the decade was marked by two dynasties, with the Dublin Rebels winning four consecutive Shamrock Bowls between 2003 and 2006, followed by a three-peat by the UL Vikings between 2007 and 2009.

=== 2010s ===
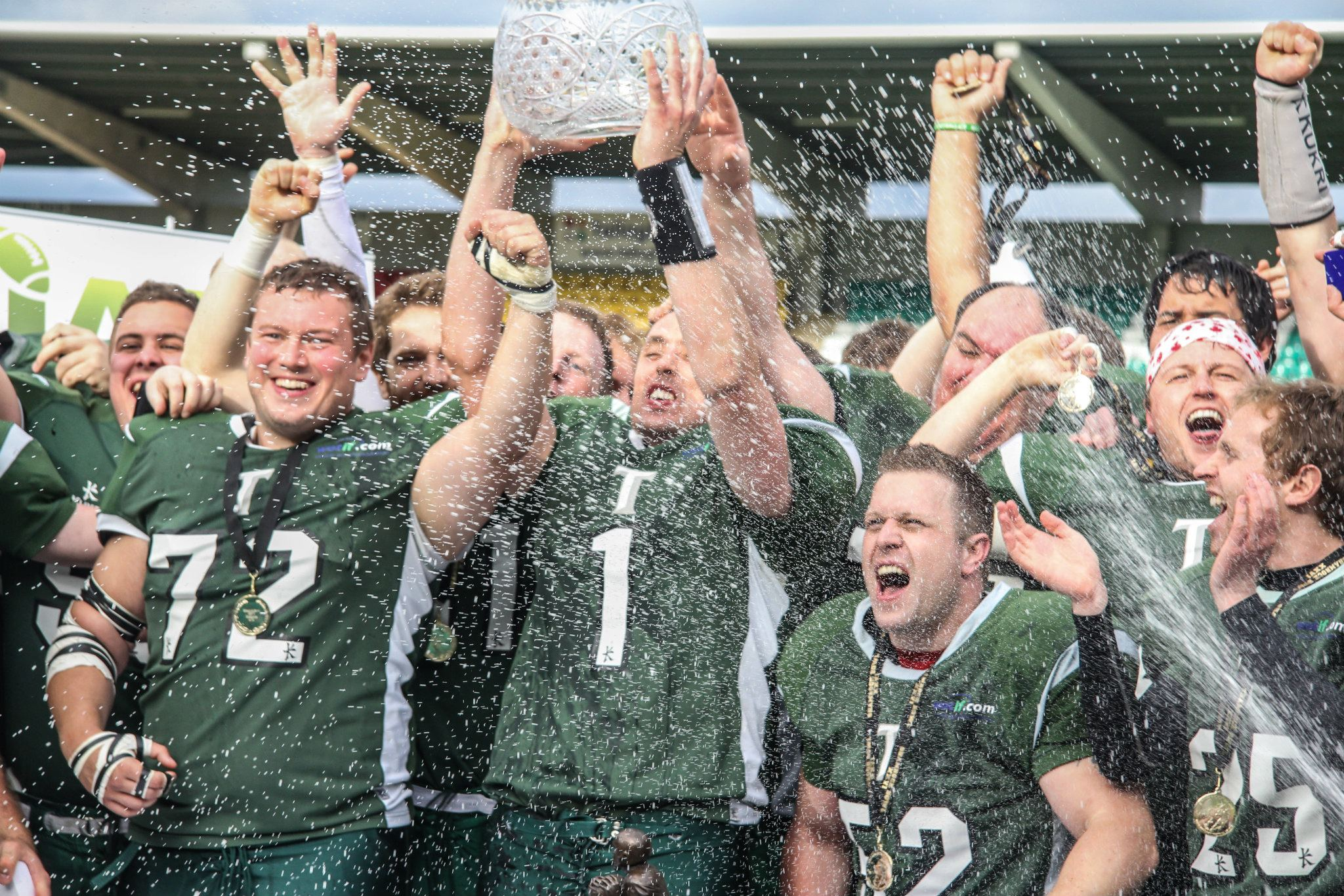
Belfast Trojans players hoisting the Shamrock Bowl in 2012, marking their first of five titles in the 2010s.

The 2010s saw the addition of several new teams, the development of youth programs, and the continued success of the IAFL's top clubs. The Dublin Rebels continued their dominance in the league, winning back-to-back Shamrock Bowls over the UL Vikings in 2010 and 2011. The 2011 season also saw the introduction of a new championship format with a playoff system that included both semi-finals and finals. The 2012 season continued the trend of league expansion, and at that time the top league was divided into North and South conferences, with the top team in each conference facing the winner of a wildcard game between those finishing 2nd and 3rd to advance to the Shamrock Bowl. In 2014, the DV8 competition was replaced by a full-team Division 2. The Belfast Trojans began a period of dominance in the league, winning four consecutive Shamrock Bowls from 2012 to 2015. The back half of the 2010s saw additional league expansion, such as the addition of a full-contact youth league in 2014, and at its peak in this era the league consisted of 23 teams over three tiers of senior play. On the senior level, the league was marked by back-to-back Shamrock Bowl wins by the Rebels in 2016 and 2017, followed by the Cork Admirals winning their first title in 2018 and the Trojans securing a fifth title in 2019.

=== 2020s ===
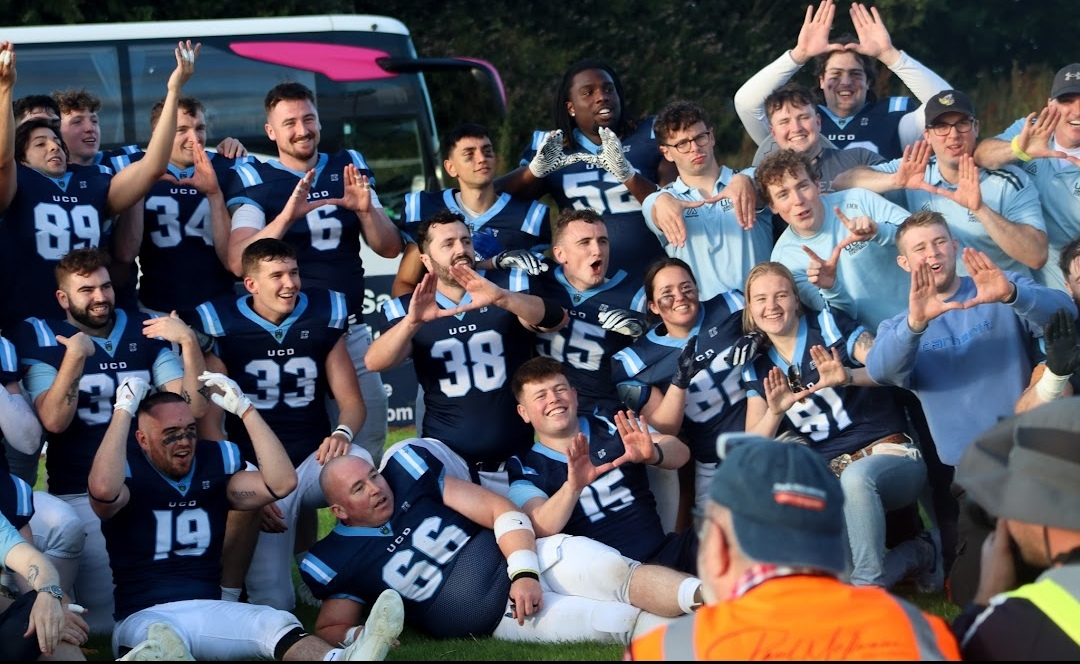
UCD players celebrating their second Shamrock Bowl victory in 2024.

The 2020 and 2021 seasons were cancelled due to the COVID-19 pandemic, halting domestic play and delaying league activities. The league was renamed American Football Ireland (AFI) in 2020, and in 2022, the league resumed play, returning to a three-tier format consisting of a Premier Division, Division 1, and Division 2. Between 2022 and 2024, University College Dublin (UCD) and Dublin Rebels met in three consecutive Shamrock Bowls, with UCD winning in 2022 and 2024, and the Rebels winning in 2023. In 2025, the Belfast Trojans went undefeated in the regular season and defeated UCD in the Shamrock Bowl final to claim their sixth title. In 2026, the Louth Mavericks won their first Shamrock Bowl by defeating the Trojans in the final, becoming the first club to win the Harp Bowl and the Shamrock Bowl in successive years.

Beginning in 2024, the senior league structure was reformed and simplified to consist of two tiers, an 8-team Premier Division to compete for the Shamrock Bowl, and an 8 team Division 1 where the winners receive the Harp Bowl and promotion to the Premier Division. AFI also launched its first women's flag football league in 2024, initially consisting of three multi-team gamedays to determine seeding followed by a playoff where the winner is awarded the Claddagh Bowl.

In 2025, the NFL announced that Dublin's Croke Park would host its first NFL International Series regular-season game, featuring the Pittsburgh Steelers as the designated home team and the Minnesota Vikings as their opponent. Ireland has also seen multiple players, such as Daniel Whelan, Charlie Smyth and Jude McAtamney, break through into the NFL. As a part of their effort to expand the game's influence in Ireland, the NFL has partnered with AFI in initiatives such as the provision of flag football equipment kits and instructional materials to more than 900 post-primary schools across the island.

== Structure ==
AFI oversee the administration of 3 codes:

- Senior American Football (18 year olds and above)
- Youth American Football (15-18 year olds)
- Flag Football (non-contact, 16 year olds and above)

Within the Senior American Football code, there are 2 separate divisions:

- AFI Premier Division – 8 teams, the top four of which qualify to compete for the Shamrock Bowl in a two-round playoff. The team with the worst record is relegated to Division 1.
- AFI Division 1 – top four teams qualify for the playoffs, of which the finalists compete for the Harp Bowl. Harp Bowl winners are promoted to the Premier Division. The Division 1 title was previously awarded as the IAFL Division 1 Bowl, but was reintroduced as the Harp Bowl in 2024, with roman numeral nomenclature retroactively applied to previous Division 1 titles. The number of teams in Division 1 is flexible under the current format, with 9 teams competing in 2024 and 8 competing as of 2026.

The Youth American Football section consists of a single division of teams playing contact football that is altered into smaller scrimmages of between 7 and 9 players per side and additional rule adjustments intended to maximize player safety and development. As of 2026, the youth league consists of eight teams, with the overall champions being awarded the Setanta Bowl.

The Flag Football section consists of a two-tier co-ed league system that incorporates promotion and relegation and a single-tier women's league.

- AFI Flag Premier Division – top teams qualify for the playoffs to compete for the Emerald Bowl, with bottom teams relegated to AFI Flag Division 1.
- AFI Flag Division 1 – top six teams qualify for the playoffs of which the finalists compete for the Glas Bowl and promotion to AFI Flag Premier Division.
- AFI Women's Premier League - Began play in 2024. As of 2026, consists of a 10-team round-robin, after which teams are divided into two 5-team group stages based on the standings that determine seedings for playoff brackets. The top division competes in a playoff for the Claddagh Bowl national championship, while the winner of the second-tier group playoff is awarded the Fianna Bowl.

== Rules and parameters ==
AFI adheres to the rules and interpretations of gridiron football laid out by the International Federation of American Football, which are designed to retain affinity with NCAA rules. AFI fields sometimes deviate from the standard 100-yard gridiron football pitch to accommodate for the typical use of Gaelic football and rugby football pitches, with fields spanning 90 yards from one goal line to the other on smaller rugby pitches and with one set of field goal uprights stationed further behind the endzone on oversized GAA pitches.

In keeping with IFAF rules, AFI games adhere to a mercy rule in cases where one team holds a 34-point lead or higher. In such cases, games proceed with a running clock, in which the clock continues to operate on most plays until the other team reduces the deficit below that threshold or the game ends.

== Teams ==
As of 2026, the senior league consists of two tiers of football, with the first tier being the Premier Division, also known as the SBC (Shamrock Bowl Conference). The second tier is the Division 1 competition, previously known as IAFL-1. The league previously had a third tier, which began as an 8-on-8 league called DV8 league from 2008 until 2012, followed by an 11-on-11 IAFL-2 beginning in 2014, which was merged into Division 1 to create the current two-tier format beginning with the 2024 season.

As of 2026, the top four teams in the Premier Division at the end of the regular season advance to compete in a two-round playoff. The winners of the Premier Division playoffs are awarded the Shamrock Bowl, and the winners of Division 1 are awarded the Harp Bowl. Harp Bowl-winning teams are granted promotion to the Premier Division, while the bottom team in the Premier Division is relegated to Division 1.

=== Premier Division (SBC) ===
Team	City	Stadium / Home field	Founded
Belfast Knights	Belfast, County Antrim	Malone Rugby Club	1993
Belfast Trojans	Belfast, County Antrim	Deramore Park	2006
Cork Admirals	Cork, County Cork	Musgrave Park	2002
Dublin Rebels	Killiney, County Dublin	De La Salle Palmerstown, Kilternan	1995
Louth Mavericks	Dundalk, County Louth	Dundalk Rugby Club	2012
South Dublin Panthers	Palmerstown, County Dublin	Kings Hospital, Palmerstown	2014
UCD	Belfield, County Dublin	UCD Sports Ground	2009
UL Vikings	Limerick, County Limerick	UL Sports Ground	1999

=== Division 1 ===
Team	City	Stadium / Home field	Founded
Causeway Giants	Armoy, County Antrim	Limepark Playing Fields	2018
Antrim Stags	Belfast, County Antrim	Newforge Sports Complex	2024
Cill Dara Crusaders	Newbridge, County Kildare	Newbridge College	2018
Craigavon Cowboys	Craigavon, County Armagh	Lurgan Rugby Club	1986
Northwest Vipers	Derry, County Londonderry	City of Derry RFC	2014
Westmeath Minotaurs	Mullingar, County Westmeath	Mullingar Rugby Club	2011
West Dublin Rhinos	Dublin, County Dublin	Castleknock College	2008
Wexford Eagles	Wexford, County Wexford	Garden City Pitch	2015

Locations of American Football Ireland Senior Kitted clubs

Blue = Premier Division · Red = Division 1

== Championships ==
=== Shamrock Bowl Championships ===
Appearances	Team (Note: Bold indicate currently active team)	Winners	Runner-up	Season(s) (Note: Bold years indicate winning seasons, italic years indicate games not yet played.)
16	Dublin Rebels	10	6	2001, 2003, 2004, 2005, 2006, 2008, 2009, 2010, 2011, 2013, 2016, 2017, 2018, 2022, 2023, 2024
8	Belfast Trojans	6	2	2012, 2013, 2014, 2015, 2016, 2019, 2025, 2026
7	Dublin Celts	5	2	1986, 1987, 1988, 1989, 1990, (Note: According to the Irish American Football research project Eirball, the 1990 Shamrock Bowl is disputed between the Craigavon Cowboys and the Dublin Celts. In 1990, the Celts elected to play in the second tier of the BAFL as well as playing unofficially against Irish teams. Meanwhile, the Cowboys won the Irish league competition, defeating the Belfast Spartans 31-6 in the final on August 11. At the end of the season, a match was organised between the Cowboys and Celts, which the Celts won 40-0.) 1991, 1993
10	Carrickfergus Knights	3	7	1994, 1995, 1997, 1998, 1999, 2001, 2002, 2003, 2004, 2017
8	UL Vikings	3	5	2002, 2006, 2007, 2008, 2009, 2010, 2011, 2012
4	Dublin Tornadoes	3	1	1993, 1994, 1995, 1996
4	Craigavon Cowboys	3	1	1986, 1987, 1990, 1992
4	University College Dublin	2	2	2022, 2023, 2024, 2025
2	Cork Admirals	1	1	2007, 2018
2	Dublin Tigers	1	1	1998, 1999
1	Dublin Lightning	1	0	1996
1	Louth Mavericks	1	0	2026
3	Antrim Bulldogs	0	3	1989, 1991, 1992
2	Trinity College	0	2	2014, 2015
1	Belfast Blitzers	0	1	1988
1	Dublin Bulls	0	1	1997
1	Belfast Bulls	0	1	2005
1	South Dublin Panthers	0	1	2019

=== Harp Bowl Championships ===
Note: (Note: Before 2024, the Division 1 title was known previously as the IAFL1 Bowl from 2014-2021 and the Division 1 Bowl in 2022-23. While the 2024 title was initially referred to as Harp Bowl I, the previous nine Division 1 titles were retroactively assigned Harp Bowl roman numeral nomenclature and the 2025 game was marketed as Harp Bowl X.)

Appearances	Team	Winners	Runner-up	Season(s)
4	Craigavon Cowboys	2	2	2017, 2018, 2019, 2024
3	Louth Mavericks	2	1	2017, 2023, 2025
3	Cork Admirals	1	2	2014, 2015, 2016
3	Westmeath Minotaurs	1	2	2019, 2022, 2025
2	UL Vikings	1	1	2022, 2023
2	West Dublin Rhinos	1	1	2018, 2024
1	University College Dublin	1	0	2014
1	Waterford Wolves	1	0	2015
1	South Dublin Panthers	1	0	2026
1	Northwest Vipers	0	1	2026
1	Belfast Trojans 2nds	0	1	2016

=== Claddagh Bowl Championships ===
Appearances	Team	Winners	Runner-up	Season(s)
3	South Dublin Panthers	3	0	2024, 2025, 2026
3	Belfast Trojans	0	3	2024, 2025, 2026
