= 2011 IAFL season =

The 2011 IAFL season was the 25th regular season of the Irish American Football League.

The regular season began on Sunday 6 March 2011 at the UCD Bowl. The opening game, which featured two of the University sides in the competition, saw Trinity College defeat UCD 20 - 16.

== Schedule ==
The IAFL kickoff game, the first game of the season, took place on Sunday, 6 March 2011 at 1 pm IST with the University Bowl Game featuring UCD taking on Trinity College at the UCD Bowl in the IAFL College Championship Game. Trinity won the game 20 - 16 in what was a close game. This was the only game to take place in the opening weekend with the rest of the teams playing their matches in the next 3 weeks.

By week 4, all teams had played at least 1 game. The Cork Admirals, Belfast Trojans and Dublin Dragons were the final teams to play at least 1 game.

== Teams ==
- Belfast Trojans
- Carrickfergus Knights
- Cork Admirals
- Craigavon Cowboys
- Dublin Dragons
- Dublin Rebels
- West Dublin Rhinos
- Trinity College
- UCD
- University of Limerick Vikings

== Regular season standings ==
IAFL North

Position	Team	Pld	W	L	T	Pts
1	Carrickfergus Knights	8	6	2	0	12
2	Belfast Trojans	8	6	2	0	12
3	Craigavon Cowboys	8	4	4	0	8

IAFL Central

Position	Team	Pld	W	L	T	Pts
1	Dublin Rebels	8	5	3	0	10
2	West Dublin Rhinos	8	2	6	0	4
3	Trinity College	8	3	5	0	3

IAFL South

Position	Team	Pld	W	L	T	Pts
1	UL Vikings	8	8	0	0	16
2	UCD	8	4	4	0	7
3	Cork Admirals	8	2	6	0	2
4	Dublin Dragons	8	0	8	0	0

=== Play-Off Qualifying Rankings ===
The top 2 teams qualify for the Play-Off Qualifiers.

Division	Team	Pld	W	L	T	Pts
North	Belfast Trojans	8	6	2	0	12
North	Craigavon Cowboys	8	4	4	0	8
South	UCD	8	4	4	0	7
Central	West Dublin Rhinos	8	2	6	0	4
Central	Trinity College	8	3	5	0	3
South	Cork Admirals	8	2	6	0	2
South	Dublin Dragons	8	0	8	0	0

=== Play-Off Qualifiers ===
10 July 2011
2pm
Play-Off Qualifiers

Craigavon Cowboys	17 - 14	Belfast Trojans

Malone RFC, Belfast

== Play-Offs ==
Semi-finals
3	Dublin Rebels	22
2	Carrickfergus Knights	6
1	UL Vikings	21
4	Craigavon Cowboys	8

Shamrock Bowl
1	Dublin Rebels	14
2	UL Vikings	13

17 July 2011
2pm
Semi-final

Dublin Rebels	22 - 6	Carrickfergus Knights

Carrickfergus RFC, Carrickfergus

17 July 2011
2pm
Semi-final

UL Vikings	21 - 8	Craigavon Cowboys

UL Sports Ground, Limerick

31 July 2011
16:00 (IST)
Final

Dublin Rebels	14 - 13	UL Vikings

Morton Stadium, Dublin

== Results ==
=== Week 1 ===
Date	Road Team	Score	Home team	Venue	Report
March 6	Trinity College	20-16	UCD	Belfield	Report

=== Week 2 ===
Date	Road Team	Score	Home team	Venue	Report
March 13	UCD	6-56	UL Vikings	University of Limerick	
March 13	Trinity College	P-P	Craigavon Cowboys	Brownlow, Craigavon	

=== Week 3 ===
Date	Road Team	Score	Home team	Venue	Report
March 20	UL Vikings	6 - 3	Dublin Rebels	Sportslink, Santry	
March 20	Carrickfergus Knights	27 - 14	Craigavon Cowboys	Brownlow, Craigavon	

=== Week 4 ===
Date	Road Team	Score	Home team	Venue	Report
March 27	Dublin Dragons	14 - 59	Trinity College	Trinity College Sports Grounds, Santry	
March 27	UCD	0 - 8	Belfast Trojans	Belfast	
March 27	Cork Admirals	0 - 6	West Dublin Rhinos	Castleknock College, Dublin	Report

=== Week 5 ===
Date	Road Team	Score	Home team	Venue	Report
April 3	Belfast Trojans	6 - 34	Carrickfergus Knights	Carrickfergus	
April 3	Trinity College	6 - 20	Dublin Rebels	Sportslink, Santry	
April 3	Cork Admirals	0 - 40	UL Vikings	Castleknock College, Dublin	

=== Week 6 ===
Date	Road Team	Score	Home team	Venue	Report
April 10	Dublin Dragons	8 - 74	UCD	Belfield	
April 10	Dublin Rebels	13 - 0	West Dublin Rhinos	Castleknock College, Dublin	
April 10	Carrickfergus Knights	8 - 45	UL Vikings	University of Limerick	
