= North Kildare Reapers =

Former American football team in Ireland

- Founded: 2012
- Folded: 2017
- League: Irish American Football League
- Conference: Shamrock Bowl Conference
- Division: South
- Location: Kilcock, County Kildare, Ireland
- Stadium: North Kildare Rugby Club grounds
- Colors: Silver, White and Black
- Championships: 2013 IAFL-1 Winners
- Mascot: Reaper
- Website: http://www.nkreapers.com

The North Kildare Reapers were an American football team which formed in 2012 and participated in the Irish American Football League (IAFL) from the 2013 to the 2017 season. The team merged with the South Kildare Soldiers after the 2017 season, with the merged club becoming known as the Cill Dara Crusaders. The team trained and played their home games at North Kildare Rugby Club in Kilcock, County Kildare.

== History ==
=== 2013 season ===
The Reapers won the IAFL-1 League with six wins and two losses.

Week	Date	Kickoff	Opponent	Results		Game Site	Week Preview	Week Recap
Week	Date	Kickoff	Opponent	Final score	Team record	Game Site	Week Preview	Week Recap
1	3 March 2013	1:00 p.m. Europe/Dublin	at Waterford Wolves	L 14-12	0-1	Waterford Regional Sports Centre		
2	Bye							
3	Bye							
4	21 April 2013	2:00 p.m. Europe/Dublin	Tullamore Phoenix	W 8-6	1-1	North Kildare RFC		
5	Bye							
6	Bye							
7	12 May 2013	2:00 p.m. Europe/Dublin	at Dublin Dragons	W 2-00	2-1	Garda RFC, Westmanstown		
8	Bye							
9	26 May 2013	2:00 p.m. Europe/Dublin	at Mullingar Minotaurs	W 40-6	3-1	Harbour Field		
10	Bye							
11	9 June 2013	2:00 p.m. Europe/Dublin	Mullingar Minotaurs	W 32-00	4-1	North Kildare RFC		
12	Bye							
13	18 August 2013	2:00 p.m. Europe/Dublin	Drogheda Lightning	W 32-14	5-1	North Kildare RFC		
14	14 July 2013	2:00 p.m. Europe/Dublin	at Meath Bulldogs	L 20-14	5-2	Navan Rugby Club		
15	Bye							
16	11 August 2013	2:00 p.m. Europe/Dublin	Waterford Wolves	W 28-14	6-2	North Kildare RFC		

=== 2014 season ===
The Reapers were promoted to the Shamrock Bowl Conference for the 2014 season, and had a record of 3–5.

Week	Date	Kickoff	Opponent	Results			Game Site	Week Preview	Week Recap
Week	Date	Kickoff	Opponent	Final score	Team record	Pts	Game Site	Week Preview	Week Recap
1	Bye								
2	Bye								
3	30 March 2014	1:00 p.m. Europe/Dublin	Waterford Wolves	W 13-00	1-0	+2	North Kildare RFC		
4	Bye								
5	13 April 2014	2:00 p.m. Europe/Dublin	at Dublin Dragons	W 21-12	2-0	+2	Garda RFC		
6	27 April 2014	2:00 p.m. Europe/Dublin	University of Limerick Vikings	L 49-00	2-1		North Kildare RFC		
7	Bye								
8	Bye								
9	18 May 2014	2:00 p.m. Europe/Dublin	at Waterford Wolves	W 68-00	3-1	+2	Waterford RSC		
10	Bye								
11	1 June 2014	2:00 p.m. Europe/Dublin	West Dublin Rhinos	L 12-9	3-2		North Kildare RFC		
12	8 June 2014	2:00 p.m. Europe/Dublin	at Trinity College Dublin	L 52-21	3-3		Trinity College Sports Grounds		
13	Bye								
14	22 June 2014	2:00 p.m. Europe/Dublin	at University of Limerick Vikings	L 18-00	3-4		UL Sports Grounds		
15	Bye								
16	6 July 2014	2:00 p.m. Europe/Dublin	Dublin Rebels	L 53-00	3-5		North Kildare RFC		

=== 2015 season ===
Week	Date	Kickoff	Opponent	Results			Game Site	Week Preview	Week Recap
Week	Date	Kickoff	Opponent	Final score	Team record	Pts	Game Site	Week Preview	Week Recap
1	1 March 2015	Bye							
2	8 March 2015	Bye							
3	15 March 2015	1:00 p.m. Europe/Dublin	West Dublin Rhinos	W 12-00	1-0	+2	North Kildare RFC	Week 3 Preview	
4	22 March 2015	Bye							
5	29 March 2015	1:00 p.m. Europe/Dublin	Belfast Trojans	L 36-00	1-1	0	North Kildare RFC	Week 5 Preview	
6	12 April 2015	Bye							
7	19 April 2015	Bye							
8	26 April 2015	1:00 p.m. Europe/Dublin	at University of Limerick Vikings	L 49-00	1-2	0	UL Sports Grounds	Week 6 Preview	
9	2 May 2015	2:00 p.m. Europe/Dublin	Craigavon Cowboys	W 13-12	2-2	+2	North Kildare RFC		Week 9 Recap
10	9 May 2015	Bye							
11	17 May 2015	2:00 p.m. Europe/Dublin	at West Dublin Rhinos	W 5-00	3-2	+2	Castleknock College	Week 11 Preview	
12	24 May 2015	Bye							
13	31 May 2015	2:00 p.m. Europe/Dublin	at Trinity College Dublin	L 48-00	3-3	0	ALSAA Sports Complex	Week 13 Preview	
14	7 June 2015	Bye							
15	14 June 2015	Bye							
16	21 June 2015	2:00 p.m. Europe/Dublin	University College Dublin	L 48-00	3-4	0	North Kildare RFC	Week 16 Preview	
17	28 June 2015	Bye							
18	4 July 2015	2:00 p.m. Europe/Dublin	at CarrickFergus Knights	L 39-00	3-5	0	Carrickfergus RFC		
Totals					3-5	6 pts			
