= Trinity College Dublin American Football =

Trinity College Dublin American football
- First season: 2008
- Head coach: Garland Drake; 3rd season, 9–7 (.563)
- Location: Dublin, Ireland
- Stadium: Trinity Sports Ground, Santry
- League: IAFL
- Conference: SBC South
- Colors: Red and Black
- Bowl record: 0–2–0 (.000)

Trinity College Dublin American football (competing as Trinity College; formerly known as the Trinity Thunderbolts) is the American football team of Trinity College Dublin.

First established as the Gridiron Society in 1993, a competitive team was formed in 2008. The team's first season was played in the Irish American Football League (IAFL) Development League. Since then they have competed in the Shamrock Bowl Conference (SBC) South.

== History ==
=== Dublin University Gridiron Society ===
Trinity College Dublin American football class of 2009

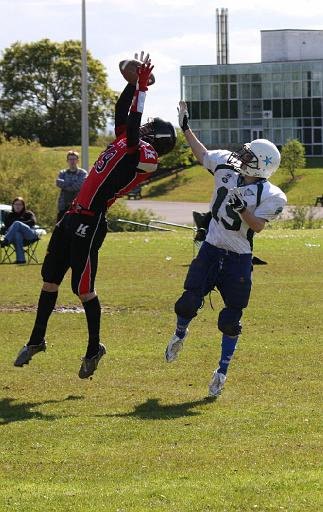
A Trinity College cornerback rises to intercept an errant pass against the Craigavon Cowboys

The club was first established in the early nineties as the Dublin University Gridiron Society. It went on to play flag football under the name Trinity Thunderbolts for one season but soon folded due to lack of numbers and interest.

=== Trinity Thunderbolts ===
==== 2008 season ====
In 2007, the club was reinstated by new club captain Conor O'Shea, once again as the Trinity Thunderbolts. IAFL commissioner Darrin O'Toole was recruited as coach. In their first year of full contact football, the Thunderbolts formed part of the new IAFL Development League (also known as the DV-8 League). Their season began with successive losses against the IAFL's oldest team, the Craigavon Cowboys. Another loss followed against the Dublin Rebels, the eventual league winners. The team then scored what would be its only victory of the season against the Dublin Dragons, in a 51–20 blowout. The Thunderbolts then lost to the Cork Admirals and the Rebels again to leave them at 1–5.

=== Dublin University American football Club ===
==== 2009 season ====
Following the conclusion of the 2008 season, the team undertook moves to become an official Trinity College club, as required by college rules, renaming itself the Dublin University American football Club. After the departure of Darrin O'Toole, injured captain Conor O'Shea became head coach. The club went on a recruiting drive to increase its squad size, looking to improve on its 1–5 record.

The moves proved successful, as in the club's first match of the 2009 season, it defeated the Edenderry Soldiers on a scoreline of 56–0, which would prove to be both the highest margin of victory in the league that season, and the first of seven shutout victories for Trinity. Trinity's only loss of the season came in their second game, against the UCD Sentinels. They followed this with two victories against the Sentinels, followed by victories against the Craigavon Cowboys, the Dublin Dragons, and two against the Erris Rams, to leave the team with an unassailable record of seven victories and one loss.

==== 2010 season ====
In 2010, Darrin O'Toole returned as head coach, and the club looked to continue its success in the DV-8 League by moving into the main IAFL league. Trinity was placed in the IAFL Central division, alongside collegiate rivals the DCU Saints, the West Dublin Rhinos, and the league's most successful team, the Dublin Rebels. Despite a strong showing in early season games, including inaugural victories over the DCU Saints and the Belfast Trojans, the club suffered from poor form during the middle of the season, culminating in a 36–6 loss to the Saints in what would transpire to be their last competitive game before folding the following season.

==== 2011 season ====
2011 began brightly for the club, as they captured the IAFL College Bowl for the first time in spectacular fashion. Facing the UL Vikings in Limerick, the game finished 12–6 after triple overtime (7 quarters) and 3 hours and 45 minutes of play; an IAFL record for match length. The victory was sealed in the third quarter of overtime with a touchdown from Rob McDowell. Linebacker Stephen Carton was named game MVP. This form continued into the full IAFL league, as the club recorded three victories in its opening four games: against UCD, the Dublin Dragons, and the West Dublin Rhinos. However, the season would end poorly: the club was forced to withdraw from the league in early June due to a lack of players (the college's term having finished in May, many students became unavailable after this time). Despite forfeiting three games, running back Rob McDowell would go on to be named the 2011 IAFL league MVP.

==== 2012 season ====
Trinity hosted a preseason charity game in November against rivals UCD, with Trinity coming out on top 7–0 thanks to a Rob McDowell touchdown. But more importantly the game ensured the children in Temple Street hospital received presents that were donated by both sets of fans and players. Competing in the newly formed IAFL South division, following the restructuring of the IAFL's divisional system, Trinity was set to embark on their 2012 campaign with early match-ups against the top three-seeded teams in the country.

In their season opener, Trinity endured a crushing 55–8 defeat at the hands of the second-ranked UL Vikings. This was immediately followed by a 52–18 loss to the reigning league champions, the Dublin Rebels. Having begun the season 0–2, Trinity sought to redeem their poor start with a win against the number three-seeded Carrickfergus Knights. Trinity sprang to an early 12-point lead and would hold on to beat the Knights 19–16. Trinity went on to dominate the rest of their season, ending 6–2 and setting various offensive records. The club concluded its season with an exhibition game on 2 June against the New England Ironmen, a collection of graduating seniors from a number of NCAA Division III football programs located mainly in the New England region, including Endicott College, UMass Dartmouth, Juniata College, Curry College, and Worcester State University.

==== 2013 season ====
Trinity competed in the South division of the then newly formed Shamrock Bowl Conference (SBC) in the 2013 season.

== Records ==
=== 2014 season ===
Winning all eight regular season games, Trinity won the south division of the Shamrock Bowl Conference. En route to their undefeated year, Trinity's offence set league records in nearly every category. As well, Trinity had three players leading in the Shamrock Bowl Conference individual statistical categories in the 2014 season (QB Dan Finnamore, WR Daniel Murphy and K Conor McGinn). On 25 May 2014 they defeated the Belfast Trojans 18–0, bringing an end to their two-year unbeaten streak. After the regular season they matched up with the Dublin Rebels in the semi-finals of the playoffs. Trinity got the best of the Rebels with a dominant 41–8 win. The students then faced the Belfast Trojans once again in Shamrock Bowl XXVIII. In a rain-soaked matchup in Tallaght Stadium, the Trojans eked out a 7–0 win to capture their third Championship in a row.

==== College Bowl ====
Game	Date	Opponent	Results		Venue
Game	Date	Opponent	Final score	Team record	Venue
1	17 November	UL Vikings	W 13–0	0–1	Santry

==== Regular season ====
Game	Date	Opponent	Results		Venue
Game	Date	Opponent	Final score	Team record	Venue
1	9 March	UL Vikings	W 34–9	1–0	Santry
2	23 March	West Dublin Rhinos	W 27–0	2–0	Santry
3	6 April	Carrickfergus Knights	W 27–18	3–0	Santry
4	13 April	Craigavon Cowboys	W 25–16	4–0	Craigavon
5	25 May	Belfast Trojans	W 18–0	5–0	Deramore Park
6	8 June	North Kildare Reapers	W 52–21	6–0	Santry
7	15 June	Waterford Wolves	W 36–0	7–0	Waterford
8	29 June	West Dublin Rhinos	W 53–6	8–0	Castleknock College

==== Standings ====
	SBC South	W	L	T
1	Trinity College	8	0	0
2	UL Vikings	6	2	0
3	North Kildare Reapers	4	5	0
4	West Dublin Rhinos	3	5	0
5	Waterford Wolves	0	8	0

==== Shamrock Bowl Playoffs ====
Trinity received a first-round bye in the playoffs and matched up against the Dublin Rebels in the semi-finals. After a commanding win over the Rebels, Trinity went on to play in Shamrock Bowl XXVIII against the Belfast Trojans. In a rain-soaked Tallaght Stadium, Belfast capitalised on a crucial Trinity turnover for the only score, and their second Shamrock Bowl win in a row.

Game	Date	Opponent	Results		Venue
Game	Date	Opponent	Final score	Team record	Venue
Semi-final	27 July	Dublin Rebels	W 41–8	1–0	Dublin Rebels
Shamrock Bowl XXVIII	10 August	Belfast Trojans	L 0–7	1–1	Tallaght Stadium

=== 2015 season ===
Trinity followed its undefeated campaign with a 7–1 record. They lost the first game in UL. Following that, they got a pair of unconventional wins including a 21-point comeback win at the Dublin Rebels. In this notable game, the Rebels became the only IAFL team in history to squander such a large lead. Trinity drove to score the winning touchdown and capped it off with a successful 2-point conversion to WR Alex Gurnee. Their season progressed much like their previous undefeated season with both a strong defense and offense. A game against the Dublin Rhinos involved a jersey mishap where Trinity wore the Rhinos jerseys for the duration of their win. Some matches this season also took place at ALSAA due to scheduling issues. Trinity advanced to the playoff where they once again matched up with the Dublin Rebels. Trinity won this game and they advanced to Shamrock Bowl XXIX with a 22–0 win over the rival Rebels. In the Dalymount Park rematch of the previous bowl game, Trinity was defeated bt the Trojans 28–14.

==== College Bowl ====
Game	Date	Opponent	Results		Venue
Game	Date	Opponent	Final score	Team record	Venue
1	23 November	UCD	L 20–26	0–1	UCD Astro

==== Regular season ====
Game	Date	Opponent	Results		Venue
Game	Date	Opponent	Final score	Team record	Venue
1	8 March	UL Vikings	L 0–14	0–1	UL
2	23 March	Dublin Rebels	W 29–28	1–1	Dublin Rebels
3	29 March	South Dublin Panthers	W 7–2	2–1	Santry
4	24 May	UL Vikings	W 22–3	3–1	Santry
5	31 May	North Kildare Reapers	W 34–3	4–1	Santry
6	14 June	UCD	W 23–14	5–1	UCD
7	28 June	West Dublin Rhinos	W 42–7	6–1	Castleknock College
8	5 July	UCD	W 45–21	7–1	UCD

==== Standings ====
	SBC South	W	L	T
1	Trinity College	7	1	0
2	UL Vikings	6	2	0
3	UCD	3	5	0
4	North Kildare Reapers	3	5	0
5	West Dublin Rhinos	1	7	0

==== Shamrock Bowl Playoffs ====
Trinity received a first-round bye in the playoffs and matched up in a rematch of the regular season classic with the Dublin Rebels. In the away match at a neutral venue, Trinity held the high power Rebels to a shutout. Advancing to the Shamrock Bowl, Trinity played a rematch of last year's Shamrock Bowl against the Belfast Trojans.

Game	Date	Opponent	Results		Venue
Game	Date	Opponent	Final score	Team record	Venue
Semi-final	26 July	Dublin Rebels	W 22–0	1–0	Deramore Park
Shamrock Bowl XXIX	9 August	Belfast Trojans	L 14–28	1–1	Dalymount Park

=== 2016 season ===
On the back of a second Shamrock Bowl loss Trinity's 2016 season never got off the ground: a paltry 2–6 record was all the students had to show. Coming into the campaign Trinity lost a core part of the team to the expatriation of Offensive Coordinator Craig Marron, Offensive Weapon Rob McDowell, OL Kieran Coughlan, QB Dan Finnamore, WR Alex Gurnee. Beleaguered, Trinity went into the season trying out different offensive combinations none of which provided for a stable week in week out team like the previous years. The season began in November with an 8–6 loss to UL in the College Championships. Beginning the SBC season Trinity lost away to UCD 22–0. They rebounded the next week against Craigavon at home. A close home loss to UL followed. Then an ugly loss away to North Kildare in a game overshadowed with penalties made for a 1–3 record at the halfway point. The students gained back some players from key injuries and recorded a 31–0 shutout win in a home rematch with North Kildare. It would be their last win during a season marred by inconsistent play on both sides of the ball. Trinity nevertheless faced a strong UL team in the first round of the playoffs and lost by a missed XP 7–6, ending their 2016 regular season. Emerging from the 2–6 season was Conor O'Dwyer who with a strong season at Tight End, was named to the Irish National Team. Trinity also played an international fixture against the visiting NYPD Finest Football team.

==== College Bowl ====
Game	Date	Opponent	Results		Venue
Game	Date	Opponent	Final score	Team record	Venue
Semi	7 November	UL Vikings	L 6–8	0–1	University of Limerick
Third place	7 November	Cork Admirals	W 8–3	1–1	University of Limerick

==== Regular season ====
Game	Date	Opponent	Results		Venue
Game	Date	Opponent	Final score	Team record	Venue
1	6 March	UCD	L 0–22	0–1	UCD
2	20 March	Craigavon Cowboys	W 26–20	1–1	Santry
3	3 April	UL Vikings	L 13–15	1–2	Santry
4	24 April	North Kildare Reapers	L 24–25	1–3	Kilcock
5	29 May	North Kildare Reapers	W 31–0	2–3	Santry
6	5 June	Dublin Rebels	L 18–38	2–4	Santry
7	19 June	UL Vikings	L 6–20	2–5	UL
8	3 July	Belfast Trojans	L 7–40	2–6	Deramore Park

==== Standings ====
	SBC South	W	L	T
1	UCD	6	1	1
2	UL Vikings	6	1	1
3	Trinity College	2	6	0
4	North Kildare Reapers	2	6	0

==== Shamrock Bowl Playoffs ====
Trinity received a Wild Card spot in the playoffs against UL Vikings. In the away match, RB Ola Bademosi scored the lone touchdown, but a missed extra point led to a Vikings win, and the end of Trinity's season.

Game	Date	Opponent	Results		Venue
Game	Date	Opponent	Final score	Team record	Venue
Wild Card	17 July	UL Vikings	L 6–7	0–1	University of Limerick

== Overall records ==
Year	W	L	T	Record	Finish	Playoff Results
2008	1	5	0	0.167	5th IAFL Development League	N/A
2009	7	1	0	0.875	1st IAFL Development League	N/A
2010	2	5	1	0.250	3rd IAFL Central	N/A
2011	3	5	0	0.375	2nd IAFL Central	N/A
2012	6	2	0	0.750	3rd IAFL South	Lost in Wild Card Round
2013	5	2	0	0.714	2nd SBC South	Lost in Semi-finals
2014	8	0	0	1.000	1st SBC South	Lost in Shamrock Bowl XXVIII
2015	7	1	0	0.875	1st SBC South	Lost in Shamrock Bowl XXIX
2016	2	6	0	0.250	3rd SBC South	Lost in Wild Card Round
2017	3	4	1	0.438	4th SBC South	N/A
Overall	36	25	2	.587		

Note: W = Wins, L = Losses, T = Ties
