= Harp Bowl =

American football championship game Ireland

- Sport: American football
- Awarded for: Playoff champion of American Football Ireland (AFI) Division 1
- Country: Republic of Ireland, Northern Ireland

History
- First award: 2014
- First winner: University College Dublin
- Most wins: Craigavon Cowboys, Louth Mavericks (2)
- Most recent: South Dublin Panthers (1st)

The Harp Bowl is the championship game of Division 1 of American Football Ireland (AFI), the second tier of AFI competition under the Premier Division. The winner of the Harp Bowl is promoted to the Premier Division in the following season, replacing the team at the bottom of the Premier Division standings. The Harp Bowl represents the culmination of Division 1's regular season, in which the top four teams advance to a playoff bracket whose finalists meet in the Harp Bowl.

The Harp Bowl uses Roman numerals to identify each game, similar to the Super Bowl and the Premier Division's Shamrock Bowl. The reigning champions are the South Dublin Panthers, who beat the Northwest Vipers 60–6 at Dubarry Park to win Harp Bowl XI on 18 July 2026.

== History ==
The Harp Bowl competition was previously known as the IAFL1 Bowl from 2014–2021 (including a two-year hiatus due to the COVID-19 pandemic) and the Division 1 Bowl in 2022–23, and was reintroduced as the Harp Bowl in 2024, with Roman numeral nomenclature retroactively applied to previous Division 1 titles.

== Results ==
No.	Year	Date	Winner	Result	Runner-up	Venue	References
I	2014		UCD American Football	40–0	Cork Admirals		
II	2015		Waterford Wolves	13–12	Cork Admirals		
III	2016		Cork Admirals	38–7	Belfast Trojans 2nds		
IV	2017	20 July 2017	Louth Mavericks	23–18	Craigavon Cowboys		
V	2018	12 August 2018	West Dublin Rhinos	16–14	Craigavon Cowboys	Gorey Celtic FC, Gorey, Co. Wexford	
VI	2019	28 July 2019	Craigavon Cowboys	28–27	Westmeath Minotaurs	Navan RFC	
—N/a	2020	not played					
—N/a	2021	not played					
VII	2022		Westmeath Minotaurs	16–13	UL Vikings		
VIII	2023	9 July 2023	UL Vikings	6–2	Louth Mavericks	Garryowen RFC, Limerick	
IX	2024	27 July 2024	Craigavon Cowboys	35–0	West Dublin Rhinos	Dubarry Park, Athlone	
X	2025	19 July 2025	Louth Mavericks	44–0	Westmeath Minotaurs	Dubarry Park, Athlone	
XI	2026	18 July 2026	South Dublin Panthers	60–6	Northwest Vipers	Dubarry Park, Athlone	

== Appearances by team ==
Appearances	Team (Note: Bold indicate currently active team)	Winners	Runner-up	Season(s) (Note: Bold years indicate winning seasons, italic years indicate games not yet played.)	References
4	Craigavon Cowboys	2	2	2017, 2018, 2019, 2024	
3	Louth Mavericks	2	1	2017, 2023, 2025	
3	Cork Admirals	1	2	2014, 2015, 2016	
3	Westmeath Minotaurs	1	2	2019, 2022, 2025	
2	UL Vikings	1	1	2022, 2023	
2	West Dublin Rhinos	1	1	2018, 2024	
1	University College Dublin	1	0	2014	
1	Waterford Wolves	1	0	2015	
1	South Dublin Panthers	1	0	2026	
1	Northwest Vipers	0	1	2026	
1	Belfast Trojans 2nds	0	1	2016	
