= Louth Mavericks =

American football team in Dundalk, Ireland

- Sport: American football
- Founded: 2012
- First season: 2014
- League: American Football Ireland
- Based in: Dundalk, County Louth
- Home ground: Mill Road, Dundalk R.F.C.
- Colours: Gold, Black, White
- Head coach: Ty Henry
- League titles: Shamrock Bowl - 2026 (XXXVIII); Harp Bowl - 2017 (IV), 2025 (X)
- Website: louthmavericks.com

The Louth Mavericks are an American football club located in Dundalk, County Louth, Ireland. Founded in 2012 and originally known as the Dundalk Mavericks, the team is a part of American Football Ireland (AFI) and play their home matches at Mill Road, the home ground of Dundalk R.F.C. As of 2026, the club compete in the AFI Premier Division.

== History ==
The Louth Mavericks American football team was established in 2012 as the Dundalk Mavericks by a group of students at Dundalk Institute of Technology (DKIT). Initially formed as a college club, they soon transitioned into an independent team associated with DKIT.

After spending 2013 training, the Mavericks joined the Irish American Football League (IAFA) Division 2 in 2014, achieving a 4–2 record in their debut season and reaching the Bowl game, where they were narrowly defeated by the Tyrone Titans. In 2015, following the disbandment of the nearby Drogheda Lightning team, the club rebranded as the Louth Mavericks in order to expand their recruitment to the entire county. The team subsequently competed in the IAFA's Division 1.

In 2017, they secured promotion to the Premier Division after winning the Division 1 Bowl against the Craigavon Cowboys, ultimately to be relegated back to Division 1 the following year. After two cancelled seasons in 2020 and 2021 due to the COVID-19 pandemic, the Mavericks were voluntarily demoted to Division 2 in 2022, and were promoted to Division 1 for the 2023 season.

2025 proved to be a successful year in Division 1 play for the Mavericks, marked by a perfect season and a Harp Bowl win. In the preseason, they announced the arrival of quarterback/head coach Ty Henry, who previously won the Shamrock Bowl with the Dublin Rebels. The team registered a perfect 8–0 season followed by a 64–0 home win in the Harp Bowl semifinal against the Cill Dara Crusaders and a 44–0 win in Harp Bowl X against the Westmeath Minotaurs at Dubarry Park in Athlone, securing promotion to the Premier Division for the 2026 season. In the 2026 Premier Division, they qualified for the playoffs as the 3-seed with a 6-2 regular season record, defeated the Dublin Rebels 56-12 in the Shamrock Bowl semi-final, and won their first Shamrock Bowl by defeating the Belfast Trojans 40-16 in the final in Athlone. In doing so, they became the first team in AFI history to win the Harp Bowl and Shamrock Bowl in successive seasons.

Beginning in 2025, the Mavericks launched a youth development team for players ages 15–18 as well as a women's flag football team that competes in AFI's Claddagh League.

== Honours ==
- AFI Shamrock Bowl Champions - XXXVIII (2026)
- AFI Harp Bowl Champions - IV (2017), X (2025)
- AFI Harp Bowl Finalists - 2023
- AFI Division 2 Bowl Finalists - 2014, 2022

== Season-by-season records ==
Note: W = Wins, L = Losses, T = Ties

Year	W	L	T	Finish	Playoff Results
2014	4	2	0	2nd IAFL Division 2	Lost Division 2 Bowl 20-7 (Tyrone Titans)
2015	2	6	0	5th IAFL Division 1	Did not qualify
2016	5	3	0	2nd IAFL Division 1 North	Did not qualify
2017	5	3	0	3rd IAFL Division 1 North	Won Division 1 Bowl 23-18 (Craigavon Cowboys); Promoted to IAFL Premier Division
2018	0	8	0	8th IAFL Premier Division	Did not qualify - Relegated to IAFL Division 1
2019	4	4	0	5th IAFL Division 1	Did not qualify
2020	Cancelled due to COVID-19 pandemic				
2021	Cancelled due to COVID-19 pandemic				
2022	7	1	0	1st AFI Division 2	Lost AFI Division 2 Bowl 22-0 (Antrim Jets); Promoted to Division 1
2023	7	1	0	2nd AFI Division 1	Lost AFI Division 1 Bowl 6-2 (UL Vikings)
2024	6	1	1	2nd AFI Division 1	Lost Harp Bowl Semi-Final 16-14 (West Dublin Rhinos)
2025	8	0	0	1st AFI Division 1	Won Harp Bowl Semi-Final 64-0 (Cill Dara Crusaders); Won Harp Bowl X 44-0 (Westmeath Minotaurs); Promoted to AFI Premier Division
2026	6	2	0	3rd AFI Premier Division	Won Shamrock Bowl Semi-Final 56-12 (Dublin Rebels); Won Shamrock Bowl XXXVIII 40-16 (Belfast Trojans)
