= Shamrock Bowl XXV =

- Event: 2011 IAFL Season
Dublin Rebels	UL Vikings
Central	South
14	13
- Date: 31 July 2011
- Venue: Morton Stadium, Dublin

Shamrock Bowl XXV was an American football game pitting the 6 time Shamrock Bowl champions, Dublin Rebels against university side, UL Vikings. The game was played on July 31, 2011, at the Morton Stadium in Santry, Dublin. The Rebels defeated the Vikings by a score of 14-13, earning their seventh Shamrock Bowl win. Rebels safety Marcus Naylor was named the Shamrock Bowl MVP.

This was a replay of the previous year's Shamrock Bowl. The UL Vikings came into the game on the back of an undefeated streak. Dublin Rebels, the reigning champions, came into the game after winning the Central Division and losing 3 matches including one against the UL Vikings.

Footage of the event was later released on YouTube and on the IAFL website. Highlights of the match were also shown on NFL Sunday.

== Background ==
=== Host selection ===
The game was originally scheduled to take place at Tallaght Stadium, however the stadium was unavailable due to Shamrock Rovers Champions League commitments.

On June 17 2011, it was reported that National Sports Campus Development Authority had agreed to facilitate the silver jubilee game at Morton Stadium. Morton Stadium, which had received an upgrade earlier in the year, had a capacity of 5,000 which gave the IAFL a chance to beat the previous attendance record.

=== Pre-game notes ===
The Rebels and The Vikings entered the game relatively evenly. The Vikings had been unbeaten all season and they had already defeated The Dublin Rebels earlier in the season. The game was taking place in Dublin, giving the Dublin Rebels a home advantage. The Dublin Rebels also entered the game as defending champions.
