= Westmeath Minotaurs =

American football team in Westmeath, Ireland

- Sport: American football
- Founded: 2011
- First season: 2013
- League: American Football Ireland
- Based in: Mullingar
- Home ground: Shay Murtagh Park
- Colours: Purple, White, Black
- Divisions: Senior Kitted: Division 1; Flag: Premier Division
- Championships: Flag: 2015
- League titles: Flag: 2015, 2022, 2024
- Division titles: Senior Kitted: 2022; Flag: 2015, 2015-16, 2022
- Playoff berths: Senior Kitted: 2016, 2018, 2019, 2022, 2025, 2026; Flag: 2014-15, 2015, 2015-16, 2017, 2022, 2024
- Website: westmeathminotaurs.com

The Westmeath Minotaurs are an American football club located in Mullingar, County Westmeath, Ireland. Founded in 2011, they are a part of American Football Ireland (AFI) and play their home matches at Shay Murtagh Park, the home ground of Mullingar RFC. The Westmeath Minotaurs field both Senior and Youth teams for tackle football and the club also supports teams in the flag football division. As of 2025, the club was competing in AFI Division 1.

== History ==
The Westmeath Minotaurs were established in 2011 and commenced Senior kitted football in 2013 as part of American Football Ireland's Division 1. In 2022, they secured promotion to the Premier Division after winning the Division 1 Bowl against the University of Limerick Vikings.

In 2022, the Senior Kitted Team defeated the Philadelphia Blue Flame by a score of 15–8 in an international friendly. Then in 2023, they won their first ever game in the Premier Division, the highest level division in AFI, over the Craigavon Cowboys, 38–0.

The flag football team began competing in 2014 and won the inaugural Emerald Bowl, becoming the Irish flag football champions in 2015. In 2022, they claimed victory in Glas Bowl III, earning promotion back to the Flag Premier Division. The club celebrated its tenth anniversary competitive season in 2022, counting the cancelled seasons of 2020 and 2021. After being relegated once again in their return to the Premier Division in 2023, the Minotaurs won Glas Bowl V in 2024 to re-earn promotion.

== Season-by-season record ==
=== Senior Kitted ===
Legend
Pct	The team's winning percentage for the season
^{†}	Shamrock Bowl champions
^{‡}	Division 1 champions
^{*}	Division championship appearance
^{^}	Playoff appearance
	Relegated

Westmeath Minotaurs Senior Kitted record by season
Season	League	Division	Regular season					Postseason results	Head coach	Refs
Season	League	Division	Finish	W	L	T	Pct	Postseason results	Head coach	Refs
2013	AFI	Division 1	7th	1	6	1	.188		Paddy Lally	
2014	AFI	Division 1	3rd	4	4	0	.500		Paddy Lally	
2015	AFI	Division 1	6th	0	8	0	.000		Paddy Lally	
2016	AFI	Division 1	4th^{^}	4	4	0	.500	Forfeited Semifinal (at Admirals)	Diarmaid Hyland	
2017	AFI	Division 1	5th	3	5	0	.375		Paddy Lally	
2018	AFI	Division 1	3rd^{^}	6	2	0	.750	Lost Wild Card (Rhinos) 13–3	Conor Brennan	
2019	AFI	Division 1	2nd^{*}	6	2	0	.750	Won Semifinal (Eagles) 27–22 Lost IAFL-1 Bowl (vs. Cowboys) 28–27	Conor Brennan	
2020	AFI	Division 1	-	-	-	-	-		Bill Dougherty	(Note: Season cancelled due to COVID-19 pandemic.)
2021	AFI	Division 1	-	2	0	0	1.000		Bill Dougherty	(Note: Season cancelled due to COVID-19 pandemic. Two friendly games were scheduled when restrictions were lifted.)
2022	AFI	Division 1^{‡}	1st^{‡}	7	1	0	.875	Won Semifinal (Vipers) 41–6 Won Division 1 Bowl (vs. Vikings) 16–13	Bill Dougherty	(Note: Promoted to Premier Division after season.)
2023	AFI	Premier Division	6th	2	6	0	.250		Bill Dougherty	
2024	AFI	Premier Division	8th	0	8	0	.000		Adam Corcoran	(Note: Relegated to Division 1 after season)
2025	AFI	Division 1	2nd*	7	1	0	.875	Won Semifinal (Rhinos) 41–6 Lost Harp Bowl X (vs. Mavericks) 44-0	Conor Brennan	
2026	AFI	Division 1	4th^{^}	5	3	0	.625	Lost Semifinal (Panthers) 54-7		
Totals				47	50	1	.485	All-time regular season record (2013–2026)		
Totals				4	5	—	.444	All-time postseason record (2013–2026)		
Totals				51	55	1	.481	All-time regular & postseason record (2013–2026)		

=== Flag ===
Legend
Pct	The team's winning percentage for the season
^{†}	Emerald Bowl champions
^{‡}	Glas Bowl champions
^{*}	Championship appearance
^{^}	Playoff appearance
	Relegated

Westmeath Minotaurs Flag record by season
Season	League	Division	Regular season					Postseason results	Refs
Season	League	Division	Finish	W	L	T	Pct	Postseason results	Refs
2014-15	AFI	Midlands^{^}	1st^{^}	9	1	0	.900	Lost Semifinal (Rebels) 25–15	
2015	AFI^{†}	South^{†}	1st^{†}	6	2	0	.750	Won Semifinal (at Cowboys) 37–31 Won Summer Final (at Eagles) 27–25 Won Emerald Bowl I (vs. Eagles) 19–13	(Note: For this season, the winners of the Winter and Summer finals played each other in the Emerald Bowl.)
2015-16	AFI	Midlands^{*}	1st^{*}	8	0	0	1.000	Won Wild Card (Elks) 39–7 Won Semifinal (Reapers) 27–19 Lost Emerald Bowl III (vs. Cowboys) 36–0	
2016-17	AFI	West	2nd	4	4	0	.500		
2017	AFI	Premier Division	2nd^{^}	5	2	1	.688	Lost Semifinal (at Eagles) 41–26 Won 3rd Place Game (Cowboys) 39–31	
2018	AFI	West	2nd	6	4	0	.600		
2019	AFI	Premier Division	9th	4	4	0	.500		
2020	AFI	Premier Division	-	-	-	-	-		(Note: Season cancelled due to COVID-19 pandemic.) (Note: Relegated to Division 1 after the season.)
2021	AFI	Division 1 South	5th	4	2	0	.667		
2022	AFI	Division 1 South^{‡}	1st^{‡}	8	2	0	.800	Won Divisional Final (Crusaders) 45–18 Won Glas Bowl III (vs. Knights) 46–12	(Note: Promoted to Premier Division after season.)
2023	AFI	Premier Division South	5th	1	9	0	.100		(Note: Relegated to Division 1 after the season.)
2024	AFI	Division 1 Central^{‡}	2nd^{‡}	8	2	0	.800	Won Wild Card (vs Mavericks) 48-28 Won Semifinal (Giants) 53-6 Won Glas Bowl V (vs. Dunboyne Wildcats) 19-7	(Note: Promoted to Premier Division after season.)
2025	AFI	Premier Division South	4th	4	6	0	.400		
Totals				71	38	1	.650	All-time regular season record (2014–2025)	
Totals				11	3	—	.786	All-time postseason record (2014–2025)	
Totals				82	41	1	.665	All-time regular & postseason record (2014–2025)	
