= Trinity Football =

Trinity Football may refer to:

- Dublin University American Football Club, the American football team of Trinity College, Dublin, Ireland
- Trinity College football, the American football team of Trinity College, Connecticut
