= Tallaght Stadium =

Association football stadium in Tallaght, Ireland

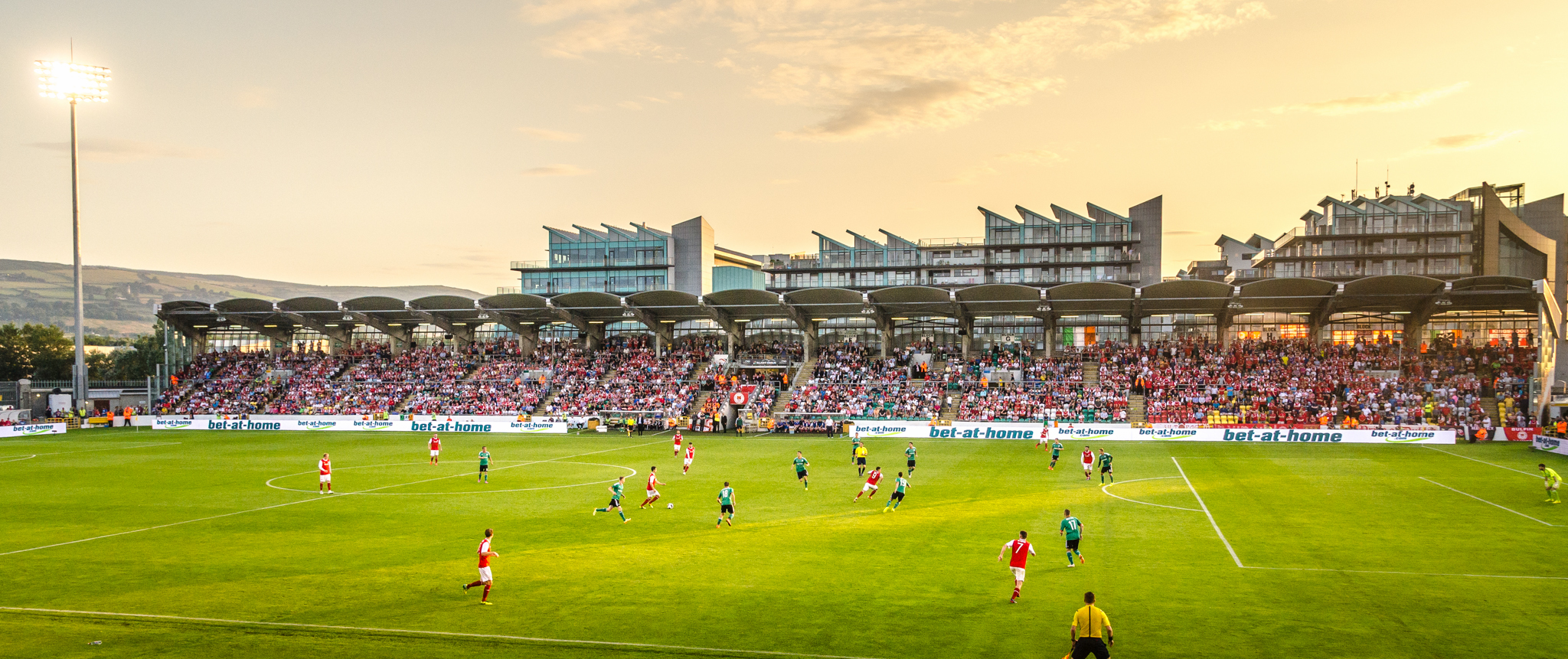
- St. Patrick's Athletic v Legia Warsaw, Champions League Qualification, Tallaght Stadium, 23 July 2014

- Location within Dublin
- Location: Whitestown Way, Tallaght, South Dublin, Ireland
- Coordinates: 53.28352°N 6.37371°W
- Owner: South Dublin County Council
- Operator: South Dublin County Council
- Capacity: 10,547
- Scoreboard: Yes
- Record attendance: 10,915 (Shamrock Rovers vs Real Madrid, 20 July 2009)
- Public transit: Tallaght (Luas Red Line)

Construction
- Groundbreaking: 2000
- Opened: 2009
- Cost: €11.2 million (to May 2009)
- Architect: Martin Noone Architects
- Structural engineer: Muir Associates
- Services engineers: R N Murphy & Assocs.

Tenants
- Shamrock Rovers F.C. (2009–present); Republic of Ireland women's national football team Republic of Ireland national under-21 football team

Tallaght Stadium (Irish: Staid Thamhlachta) is an association football stadium in Ireland based in Tallaght, South Dublin. The club Shamrock Rovers originally announced details of the stadium in July 1996. The stadium is now owned and operated by South Dublin County Council with Shamrock Rovers as the anchor tenants. It is the League of Ireland's Only UEFA Category Four Stadium, With other Irish clubs having to play UEFA Club Competition Qualifying Rounds Here. Tallaght Stadium also hosts the Woman's FAI Cup final every year.

== Stadium information ==
The main stand holds home supporters, club officials and press. A second stand on the opposite (east) side of the ground, was completed in August, 2009. This stand holds the stadium's TV gantry and brought the seating capacity to 6,000 and currently houses away fans. A temporary south stand was constructed over a short period in early September 2011 for Rovers' games in the 2011–12 UEFA Europa League group stage. In 2019 a permanent South Stand was opened behind one of the goals, bringing the capacity to 8,000. Construction of new North Stand started in 2022, and was opened in 2024 which completed the fourth side of the ground and brought the capacity up to 10,000 seats. All four stands are covered.

Refreshment stalls are located at the southern end as is a stadium control room. In June, 2013, a scoreboard was added to the stadium control room.

Temporary seating has been constructed at the stadium three times—once for a club friendly against Real Madrid, which gave the ground a temporary capacity of 10,900 again before the 2009 FAI Cup Final, giving the ground a temporary capacity of 8,500 and for Rovers' games in the 2011–12 UEFA Europa League group stage.

=== Megastore ===
Located behind the North Stand is the Shamrock Rovers Megastore.

Though previously run by kit supplier, Umbro, it is now fully operated by Rovers. The Megastore was expanded in March, 2011, to include the Rovers Café. Within the Café was a large collection of memorabilia and trophies from the club's foundation in 1899 to the present day that have been donated to the Shamrock Rovers Heritage Trust and have been placed on public display. For the 2013 League of Ireland season, the cafe was replaced with a Customer service area.

=== Glenmalure Suite ===
Club members can visit the Glenmalure Suite 60 minutes before kick off, at half time, and after the game for 30 minutes. Occasional post match Q&A with the manager and players are held in the suite.

For the 2018 League of Ireland Premier Division season the bigger 1899 Suite opened for members.

== History ==
=== Planning disagreements ===
The following chronology is taken from the Judgement from the High Court on the Judicial Review.

On 10 February 1997, South Dublin County Council passed a resolution to lease land comprising approximately 12.18 acres (49,300 m^{2}) at Whitestown Way for the construction of a Stadium for Shamrock Rovers F.C. On 14 January 1998, planning permission was granted and on 24 March 2000, the lease was granted to Mulden International Limited. On 20 October 2000, Mulden International Limited transferred their lease to Slonepark Company Limited to build the stadium and work commenced in October, 2000. Work ceased at the site in November, 2001, with the pitch and drainage laid, the main stand almost complete and other buildings in various states of completion.

Following a prolonged period where no work was carried out at the stadium and a refusal by the Planning Authority in December 2004 to extend the lease the Council terminated the lease on 4 January 2004.

An examiner was appointed to Shamrock Rovers F.C. on 11 April 2005, and the council engaged in discussions with the examiner regarding the completion of the stadium and its use by Shamrock Rovers Football Club when completed. Following the examinership process a supporters group, the '400 Club' took control of Shamrock Rovers and run the club today as the Shamrock Rovers Members Club.

A public consultation process began on 18 July 2005, to complete the soccer stadium at Sean Walsh Memorial Park. Thomas Davis CLG participated fully in the public consultation process. A county Managers report was presented to the council on 12 December 2005, which provided for the increase of playing area to accommodate senior Gaelic games and other uses subject to allocation of funds from the Department of Arts, Sports and Tourism. The council then informed the Department of the resolution and request clarification regarding funding from the department.

Plan of the first phase of the Stadium on display at the site. Note the proximity of the East (right) stand to the adjoining school. Extending the pitch dimensions would have resulted in reduction of capacity in this stand.

A reply was received from the department on 24 January 2006, stating that the Minister could not agree to make funding available for the modified development.

The recent Council decision to adopt the manager's report subject to increasing the size of the playing pitch and extending the stands seriously undermines the basis of the previously agreed approach. A larger pitch cannot easily be accommodated within the present site given the buildings already in place and would mean that a future stand at the far side of the existing uncompleted stand would be about half the size as originally envisaged, thus limiting the future capacity to about 4,500. Given that the ends of the partially completed west stand are curved means that any proposal to extend along the length is likely to involve significantly increased costs. ... In response to the request from South Dublin County Council that funding be provided towards the new development as envisaged by the resolution recently passed by your Council, I wish to confirm that the Minister cannot agree to make the funding available on the basis of the new proposed development.

— Letter from Dept. Arts, Sport & Tourism, 24 January 2006

Acting on the Ministers response the Council voted in favour of proceeding with the original plans on 13 February 2006.

Thomas Davis GAA club instituted judicial review proceedings in the High Court in May, 2006. Their main argument was that the decision of the council on 13 February 2006, to revert to the original plans for the stadium, which did not include a senior GAA pitch, was unlawful. Their submission on the technical point was accompanied by cultural arguments that 'the youth of Tallaght will be restricted to a diet of Association football' and that a soccer-only ground would place the 'applicant at a severe disadvantage in attracting the youth of Tallaght to the club, the sport and the GAA culture'. However the stadium, with the original design, could accommodate junior GAA games as the pitch used at this level fits within the stadium's dimensions. It was only senior GAA games that would not have been facilitated.

The disagreement had several low points that were played out in the media. Some Shamrock Rovers fans unveiled a banner at a league game showing their contempt for Thomas Davis's actions in taking the matter to court. And contrary to the GAA policy of being apolitical Thomas Davis GAA club made it known that the Minister of State Conor Lenihan TD, the local Dáil representative, was no longer welcome at the club because of his support for Minister John O'Donoghue's stance and called for the clubs members to make the stadium a general election issue.

The judicial review began on 20 April 2007, and concluded on 14 December 2007. In the High Court decision Mr. Justice Roderick Murphy found in favour of South Dublin Co. Council and Shamrock Rovers. He found that Thomas Davis had no financial or proprietary interest in the development site having had no agreement with SDCC for its use and noted the extensive facilities they had already been given by the council. And so Thomas Davis was not prejudiced by the decision being made in February rather than late January. The resolution to change the stadium was conditional on additional funding from the department in the absence of this funding the resolution could not stand or, more properly, could not be implemented. The court concluded that "it would be wrong of the respondent to commit itself to unbudgeted expenditure or to delay the implementation of its resolution of 13 February 2005. The court, accordingly, refuses the relief sought by Thomas Davis."

An application by Thomas Davis for leave to appeal this decision to the Supreme court was refused by Judge Murphy on 25 January 2008. Building commenced on the stadium on 6 May 2008, six and a half years after work had first stopped.

=== Opening and development ===
The first match in the new stadium was held on 13 March 2009. Rovers made a winning start to life in Tallaght as they saw off the challenge of Sligo Rovers 2–1 in front of a sell-out crowd of 3,000. Gary Twigg had the honour of being the first man to score at the new stadium.

On 20 July 2009, Shamrock Rovers played Real Madrid at Tallaght Stadium as part of a "festival of football" which also included games against Newcastle United and Hibernian. Temporary seating was installed taking capacity up to 10,900. Real Madrid won the game by one goal to nil with a late goal. The match was notable for the debut appearance of Cristiano Ronaldo for Real Madrid. The second (east) stand was opened for a game against Dundalk on 22 August 2009, which attracted over 4,500 fans. The stadium was sold out the following week, albeit with capacity restrictions (meaning a crowd of about 5,400) for a derby with St Patrick's Athletic. Its first full house with the new capacity came against Bohemians on 2 October 2009, as 6,000 tickets were sold out a week in advance.

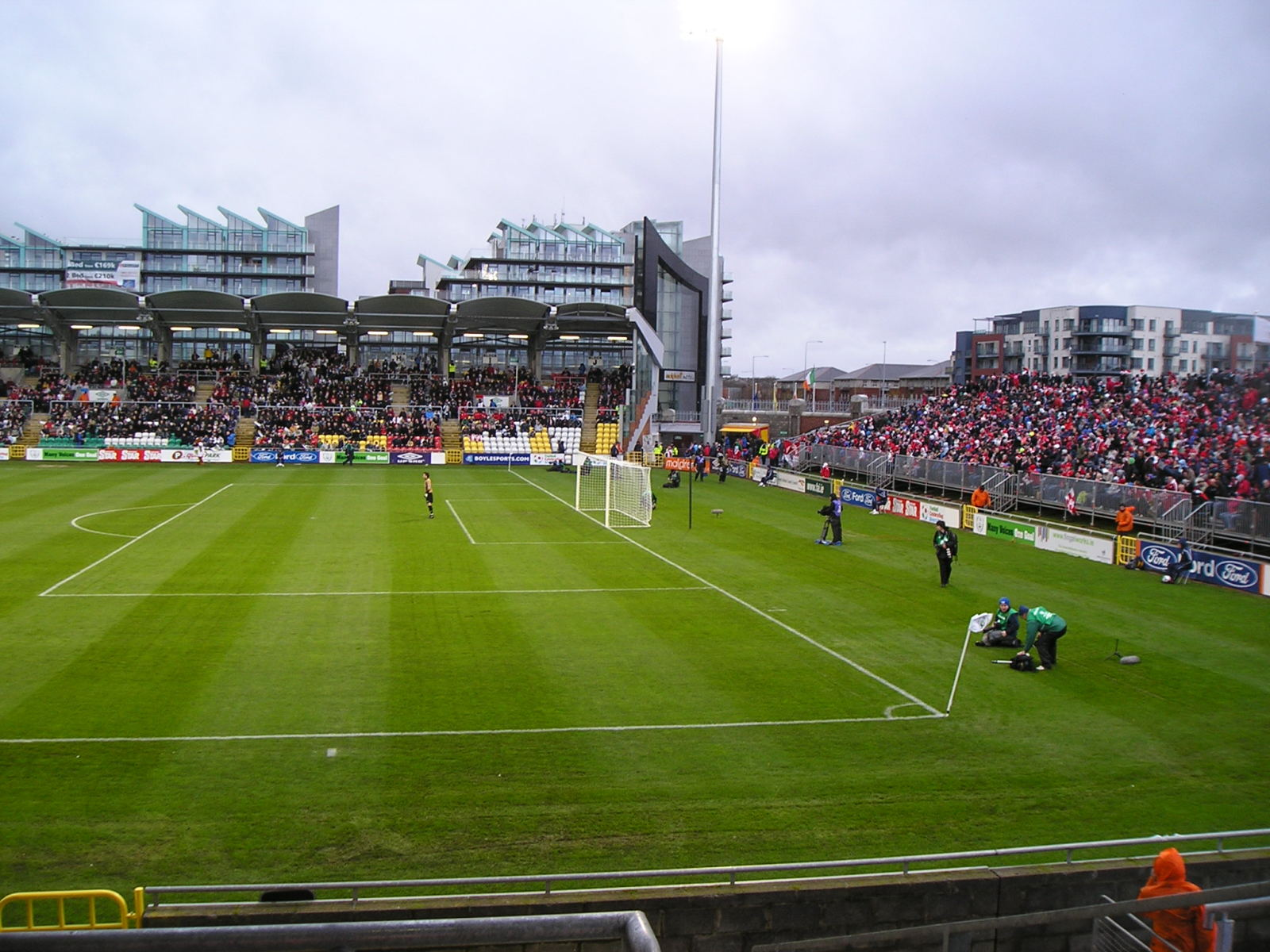
Tallaght Stadium during the 2009 FAI Cup Final

Tallaght Stadium won the 2010 Airtricity League Pitch of the Year award. It also won the 2012 Airtricity League Pitch of the Year award.

In 2019 the South Stand was opened, behind the southern goal, bringing the capacity up to nearly 8,000 seats. A north stand behind the opposite goal at the 'Square end', was opened in 2024 and includes 2,000 additional seats, bringing the capacity of Tallaght stadium up to over 10,000 seats.

=== Cup football ===
The 2009 FAI Cup Final was held at the stadium. Sporting Fingal were winners over Sligo Rovers before 8,105 people. The Setanta Sports Cup Final has been held on four occasions at Tallaght Stadium, in 2010, 2011, 2013, and 2014. In the 2013 final, on 13 May 2013, Shamrock Rovers defeated Drogheda United 7–1, in front of 4,022 fans. Following the completion of its fourth stand, Tallaght stadium hosted the tenth edition of the President's Cup in which Rovers beat St. Pat's in front of a record crowd of 8,053.

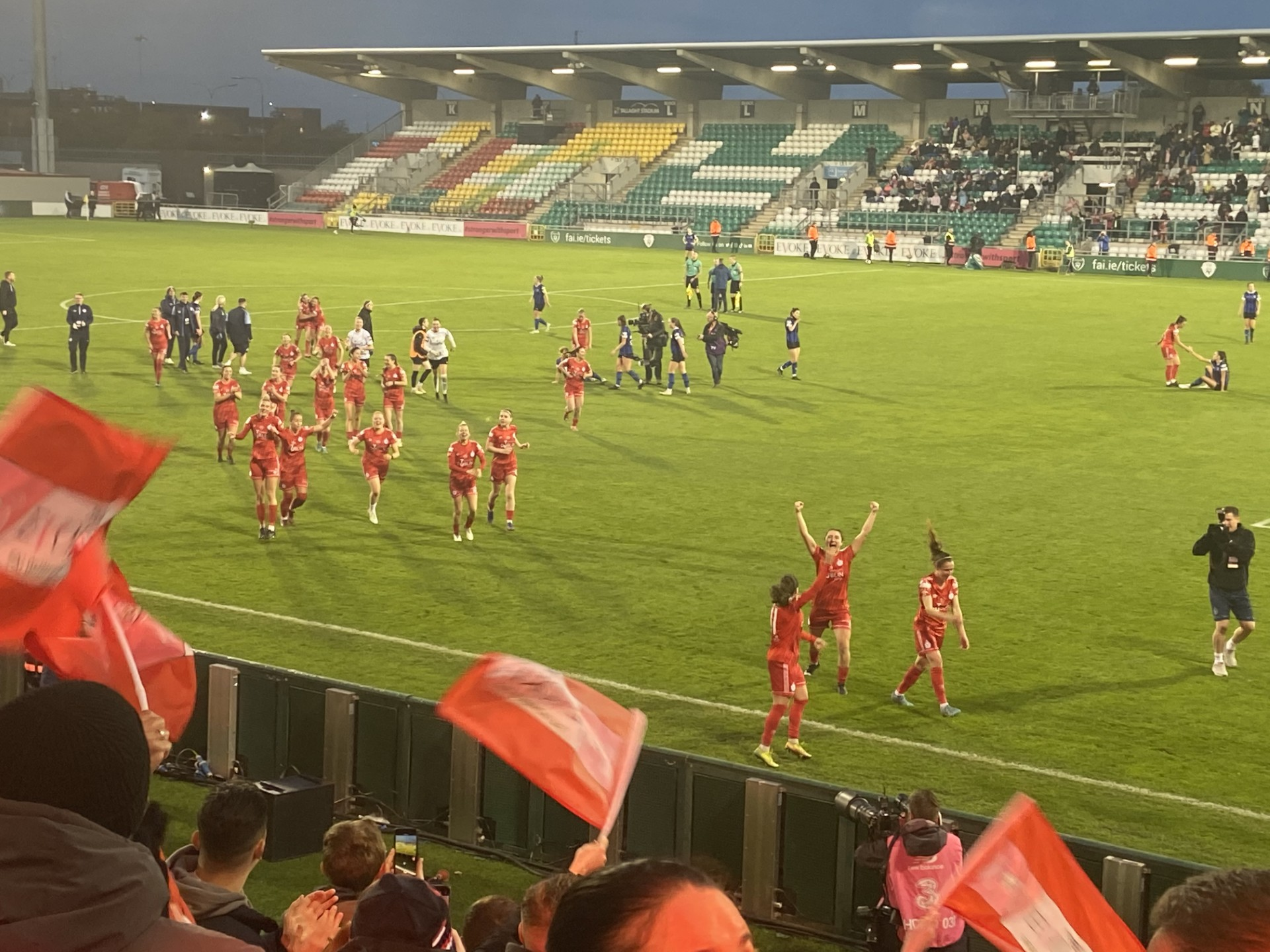
Shelbourne players and fans celebrate winning the FAI Women's Cup final at Tallaght Stadium on 6 November 2022

=== League football ===
The capacity of Tallaght Stadium was increased following the opening of the South Stand in 2019. Rovers achieved their biggest league attendance since moving to Tallaght in a 1–0 loss to Bohemians in front of a crowd of 6,414 on 23 April 2019. That attendance figure was topped later that season with 7,021 attending a Rovers-Bohemians derby on 30 August 2019. Shamrock Rovers won the match 1–0. The following season Rovers defeated Dundalk 3–2 in front of a league record Tallaght crowd of 7,522 on 28 February 2020.

Due to the COVID-19 pandemic matches were played behind closed doors for much of the 2020 and 2021 seasons. However Rovers clinched the 2021 League of Ireland Premier Division title in a 3–0 victory over Finn Harps on 29 October 2021 in front of 7,030 at Tallaght stadium. On 19 November 2021, a league record of 7,765 packed in to witness Shamrock Rovers crowned league champions for the 19th time.

Rovers set another league attendance as a 7,864-strong crowd witnessed a 2–0 victory over Bohemians on 5 May 2023. On 29 September 2023, 7,879 witnessed Rovers beat Shelbourne 1–0, setting yet another attendance record for a league match at Tallaght stadium. This record was broken again in November 2023 as 8,021 fans celebrated the Hoops' 21st Premier Division Title win against Sligo Rovers. Rovers' average league attendance in 2023 rose to 6,115 per game. On 29 March 2024, following the opening of the north stand 10,094 fans saw Rovers defeat their city rivals Bohemians 3–1, the biggest turnout for a regular league game this century and in Dublin since 1990. This record was bested by a crowd of 10,208 on October 12 2026 who watched Shamrock Rovers defeat Bohemians 2-1.

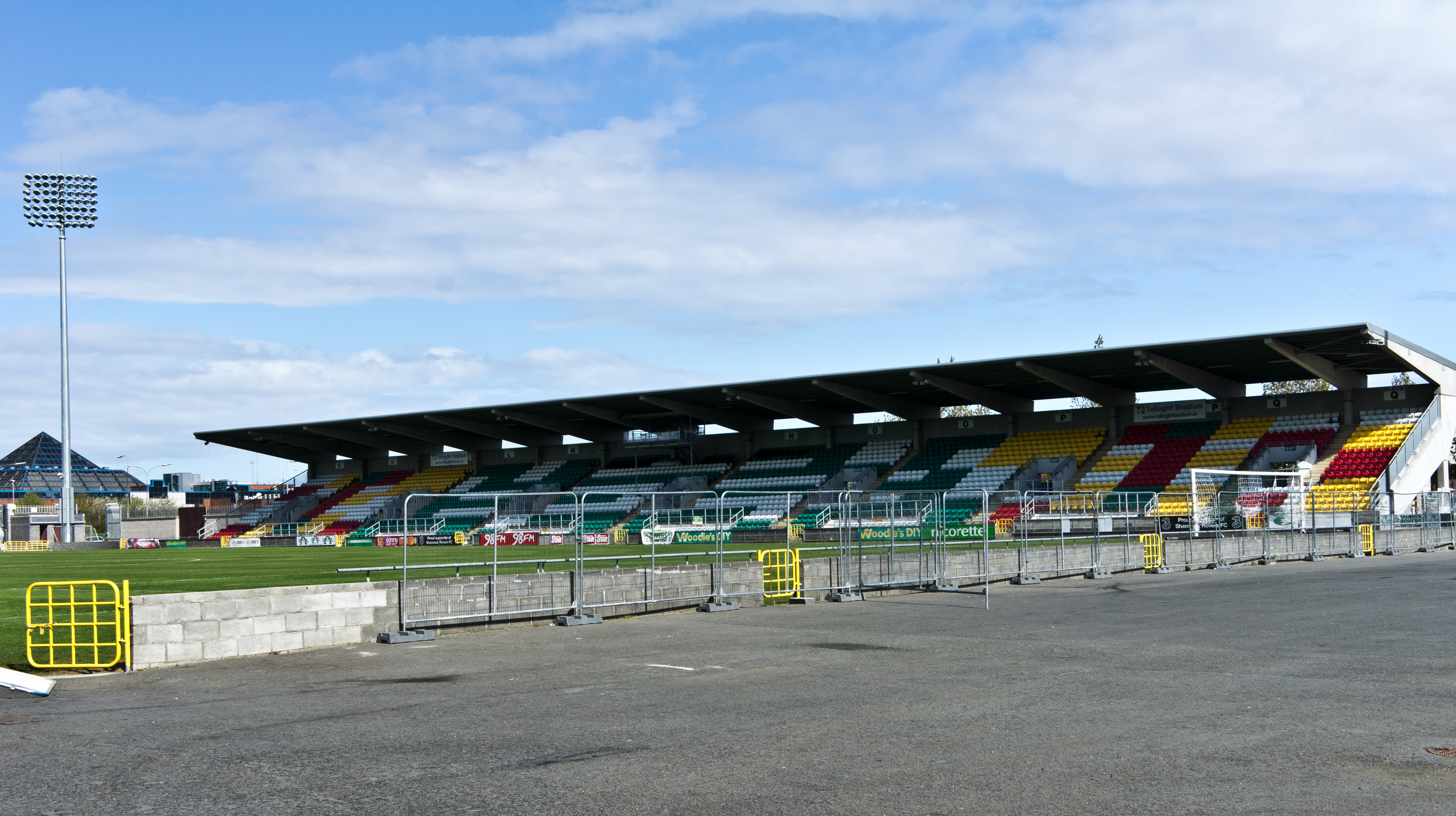
East stand at Tallaght Stadium

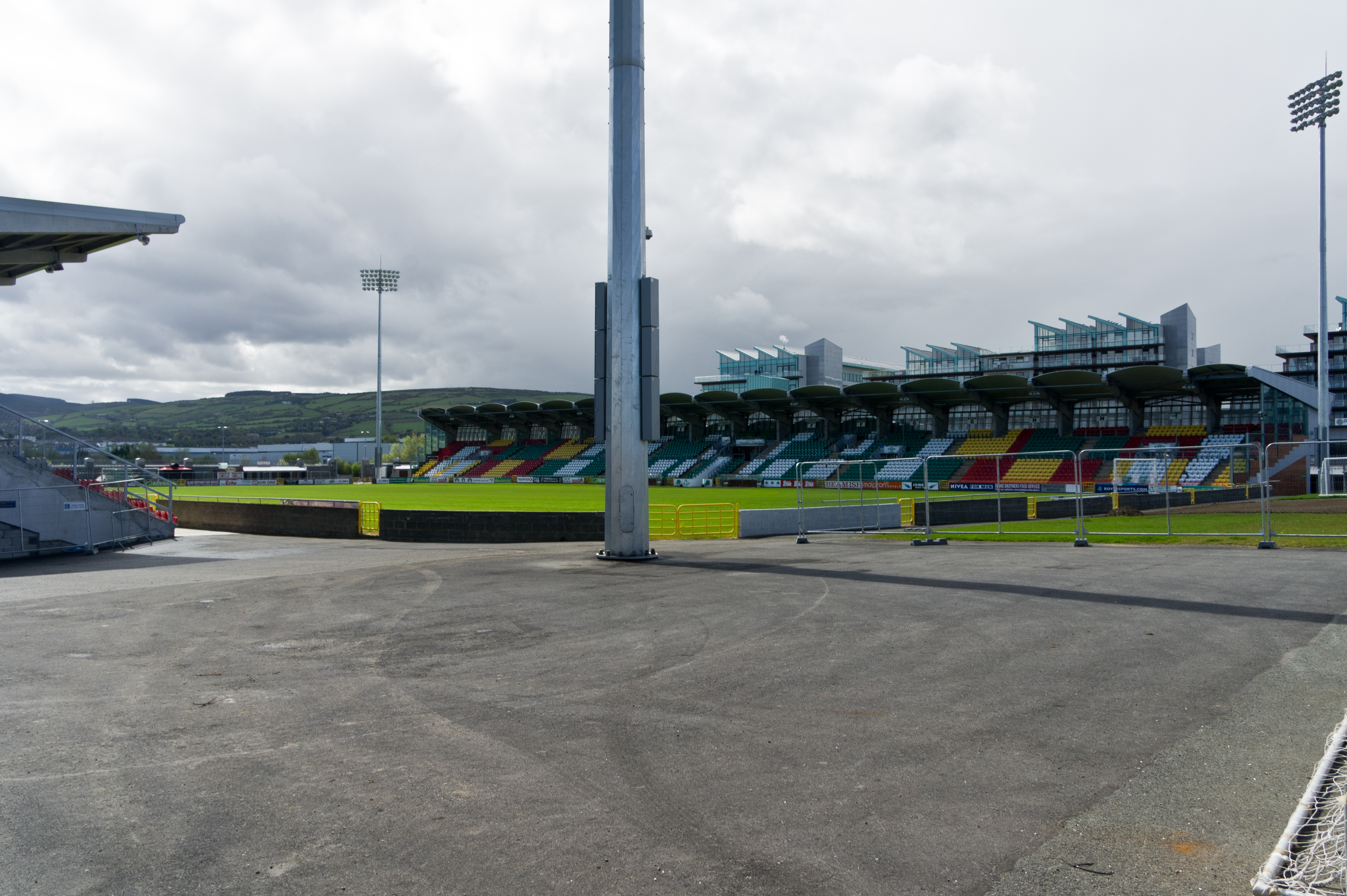
Main stand at Tallaght Stadium

=== European football ===
The first European game in the stadium was held in July, 2010, when Rovers drew with Bnei Yehuda of Tel Aviv in the UEFA Europa League. After Rovers eliminated the Israelis the next round draw saw Juventus play at the stadium in front of a crowd of 5,800.

The stadium hosted its first UEFA Champions League game in July, 2011, and hosted Rovers' games in the 2011–12 UEFA Europa League group stage. In order to comply with UEFA criteria for participating in the group stages of the UEFA Europa League, a south stand was constructed over a short period in early September 2011. Although constructed with temporary style construction techniques & materials the new stand was passed fit by UEFA inspectors as fulfilling the criteria for permanent seating. The inclusion of the new south stand brought the stadium capacity above the minimum of 8,500 seats needed to be classified as a Category 4 Stadium as laid out in the UEFA Stadium Infrastructure Regulations. On 15 December 2011, Rovers lost 4–0 to Tottenham Hotspur in its final group stage match of the 2011-12 Europa League in front of 8,500 fans. Due to seating restrictions at Richmond Park, St Patrick's Athletic played a 2011–12 UEFA Europa League third qualifying round home game against Karpaty Lviv at Tallaght Stadium, and a 2012–13 UEFA Europa League qualifying phase match against Hannover 96. After the 2011–12 UEFA Europa League group stage, the seats were removed to bring the capacity of the stadium back to 6,000.

Rovers played FK Ekranas in the 2012–13 UEFA Champions League qualifying phase match at Tallaght stadium in front of 4,800 in July 2012.

The stadium hosted Dundalk's home match against BATE Borisov in the 2016–17 UEFA Champions League third qualifying round, and later their home Europa League group stage matches in 2016–17, after their home ground, Oriel Park, did not meet UEFA standards for hosting matches at either stage.

The stadium hosted Rovers' 2022–23 UEFA Europa Conference League group stage matches after the Dublin side qualified for European group stage football for the second time ever. Tallaght stadium once again hosted 2024–25 UEFA Conference League league phase matches and the second leg of Rovers' knockout phase match against Molde FK which they lost on penalties in front of 9,533 fans.

In 2025, Shelbourne played their three 2025–26 UEFA Conference League league phase home matches at the stadium instead of Tolka Park, which did not meet UEFA requirements. Their final home league phase game against Crystal Palace saw a new record attendance for a competitive game at the stadium, a turnout of 10,143. Shamrock Rovers also played in the 2025 Conference League group stages at Tallaght, including a sold-out game against Shakhtar Donetsk of Ukraine.

=== International football ===
Tallaght Stadium hosted games for the 2019 UEFA European Under-17 Championship

Tallaght Stadium hosted the Ireland's women's football team's 2023 Women's World Cup qualification matches. It hosted a record crowd at the time for an Irish women's football match, with 6,952 in attendance for Ireland's 1–0 victory over Finland to secure a play-off spot for the 2023 World Cup.

== Current layout ==
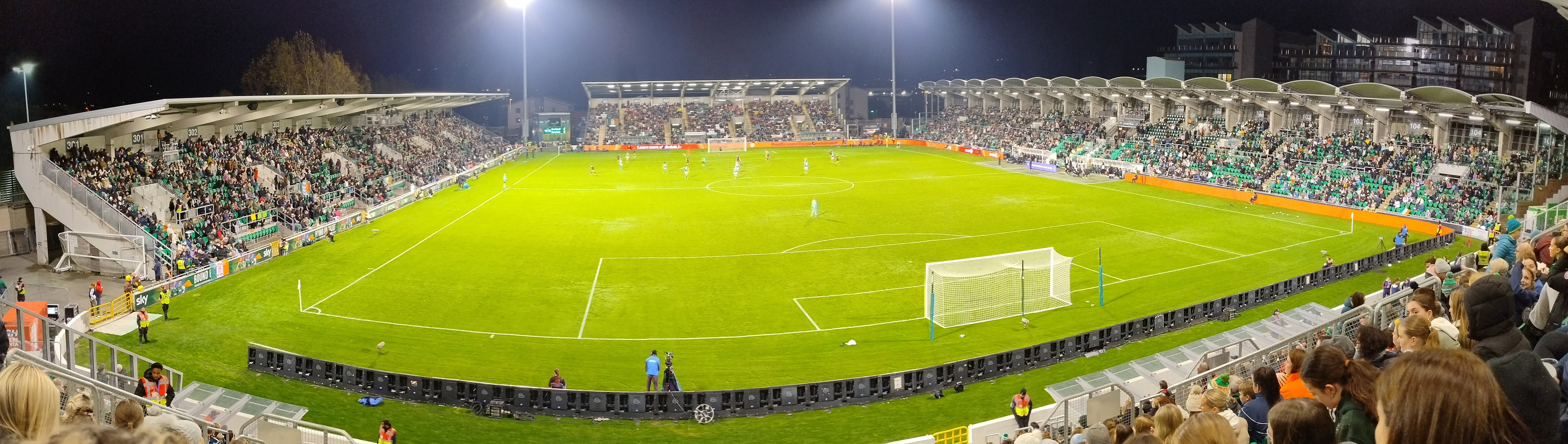
Ireland Women's international football match against Georgia in 2024

=== Main stand ===
The main stand runs the length of the west side of the pitch and was the first stand to open in the stadium. It houses the club's officials and the press facilities and holds 3,078 seats. The main stand also houses the dressing rooms. The club's superstore is situated behind the stand.

=== East stand ===
The east stand runs the length of the east side of the pitch and was opened late in the 2009 season with capacity of 2,893 seats. The ultras within the club's support base used to congregate in the east stand, but in 2019, with the opening of the South Stand, the more vociferous Rovers supporters relocated there.Away supporters are now accommodated in the east stand. In July 2010 a control room was constructed at the car park end of the east stand. This stand is used currently only as overflow Incase of the North, South and main stand selling out.

=== South Stand ===
The south stand, located behind one of the goals, was opened in 2019, holding 2,160 seats. The ultras congregate in this stand and it houses many of Rovers more vocal supporters., Making the move when it first opened.

=== North Stand ===
The North stand located behind the Tallaght 'Square end' goal began construction in mid 2022 and was planned to bring the stadium up to a UEFA Category 4 stadium once opened. This development cost €11.5m and includes improvement works in the main stand's corporate area to provide additional media, conference and meeting room facilities. The new North Stand holds 2,416 seats bringing overall capacity to 10,547. The expansion project, which was originally expected to be completed by the end of July 2023, was opened in time for the start of the 2024 season. this is also known as the "Family Stand."

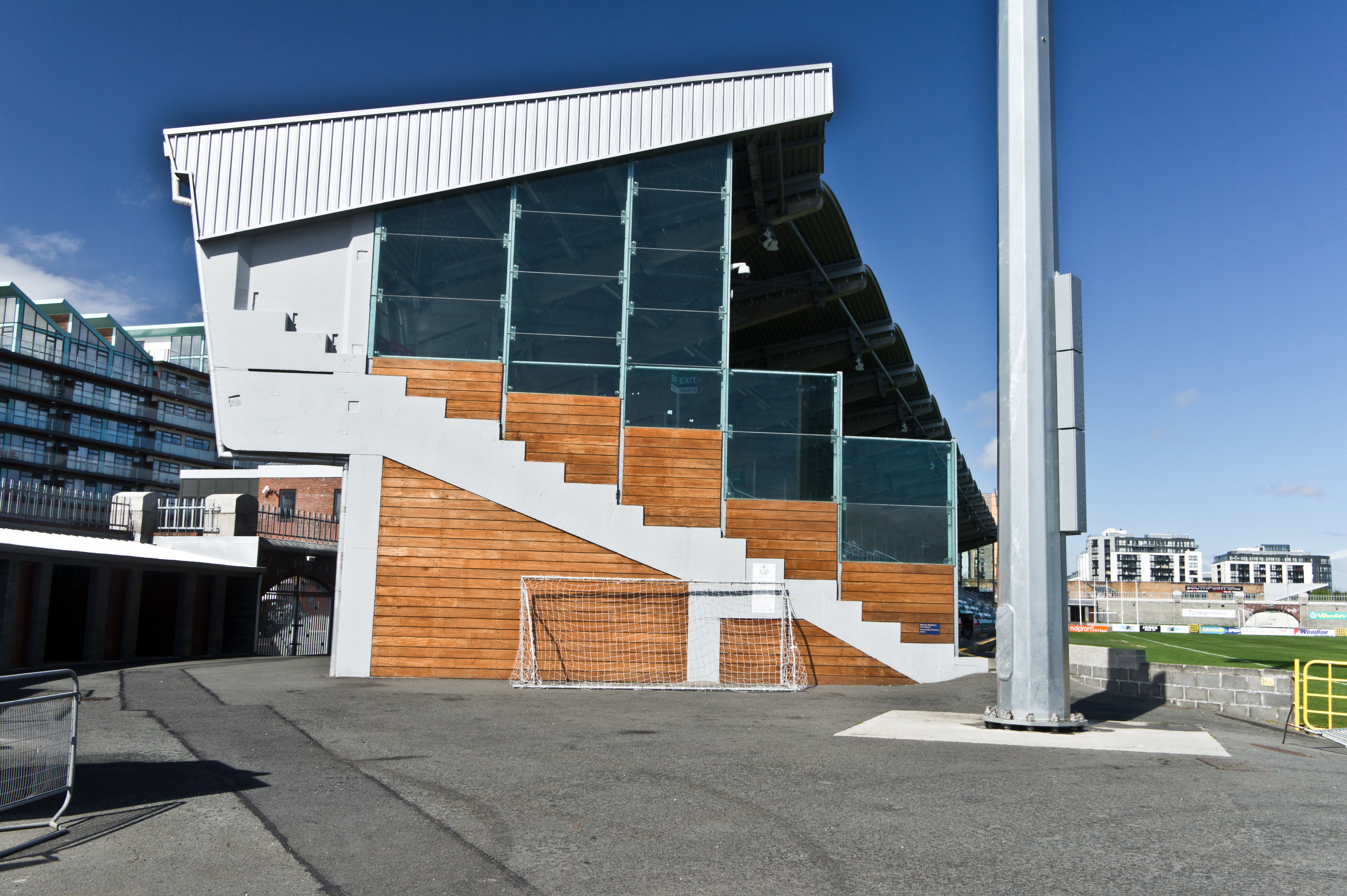
Main Stand side view

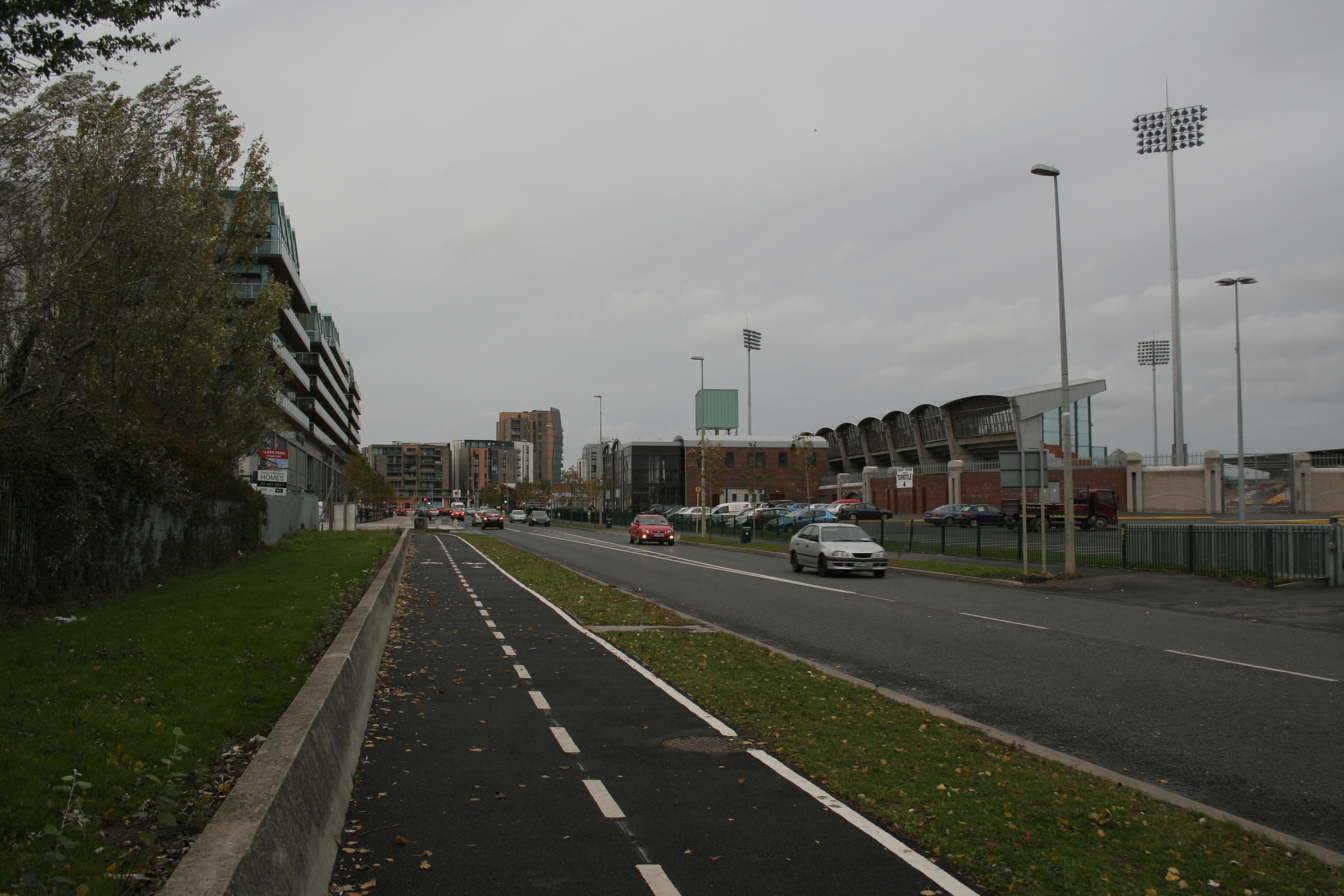
Whitestown Way view

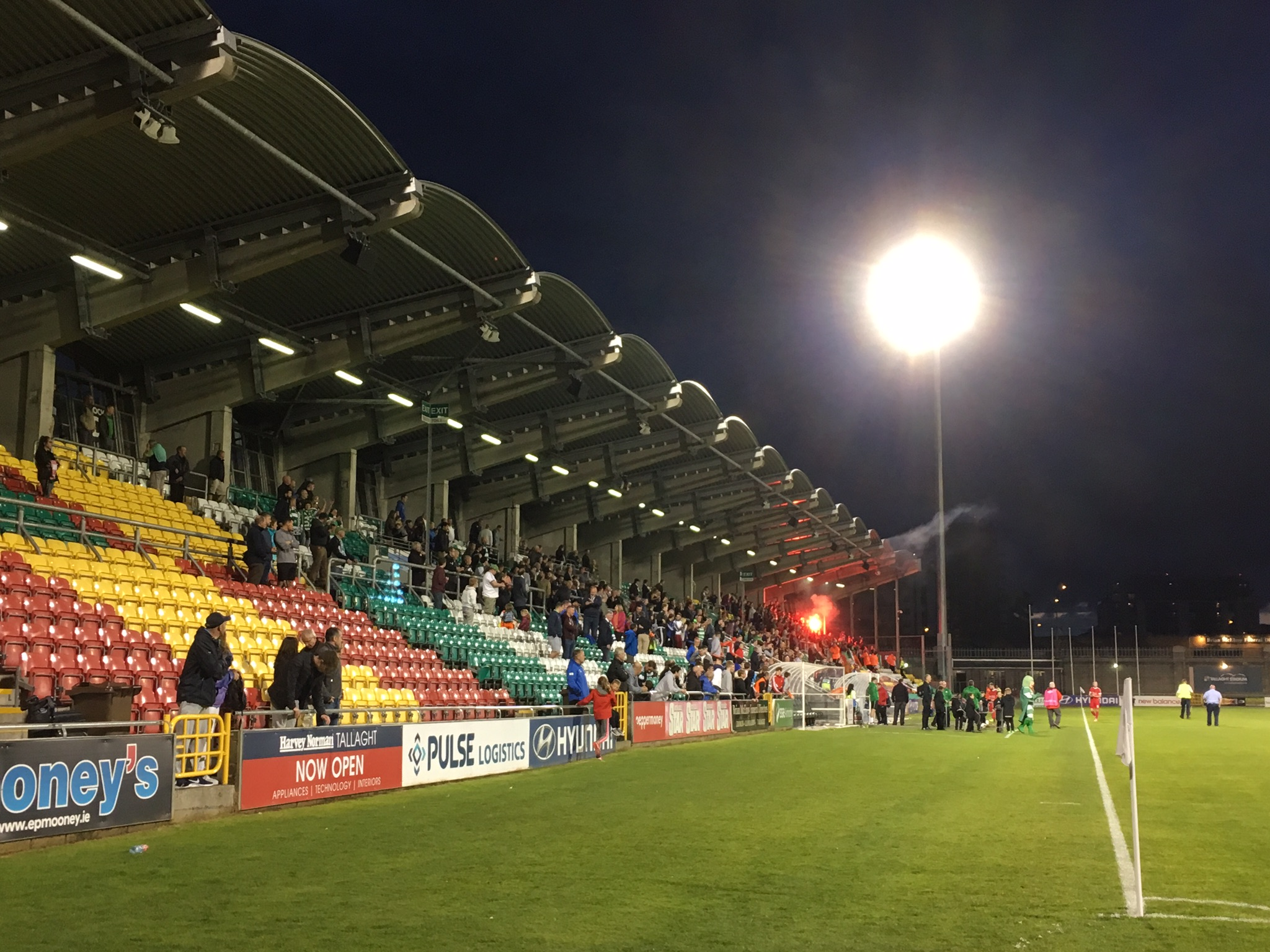
Main Stand (Pre-2023)

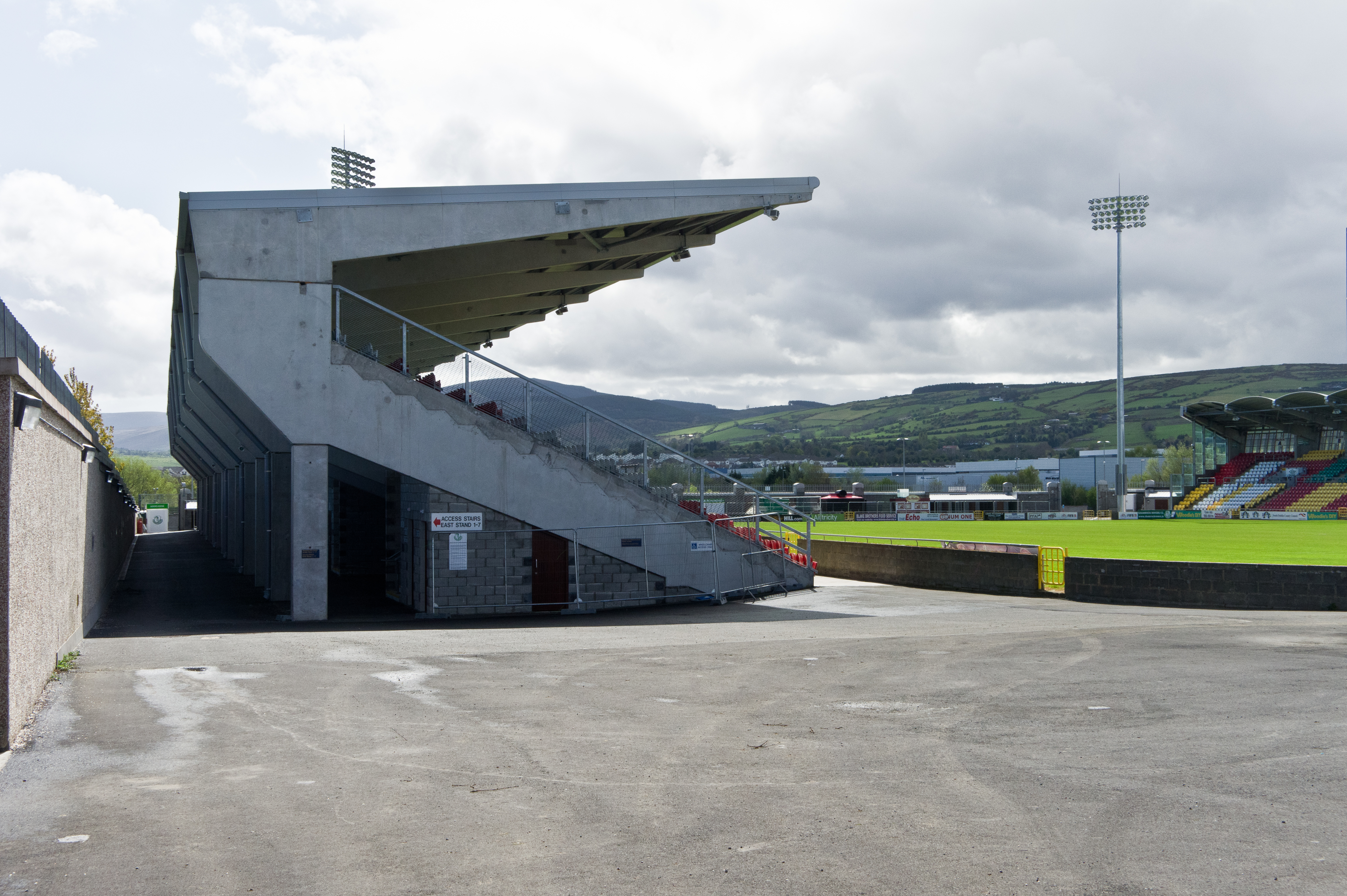
East Stand side view

== Other sports ==
=== Rugby league ===
Ireland played their last match of the 2010 European Cup at Tallaght Stadium, losing 42–22 to Scotland. As part of the 2014 Rugby League European Championship, Tallaght Stadium hosted the match between Ireland and France on 18 October. Tallaght stadium also hosted the match between Ireland and Scotland on 25 October 2014.

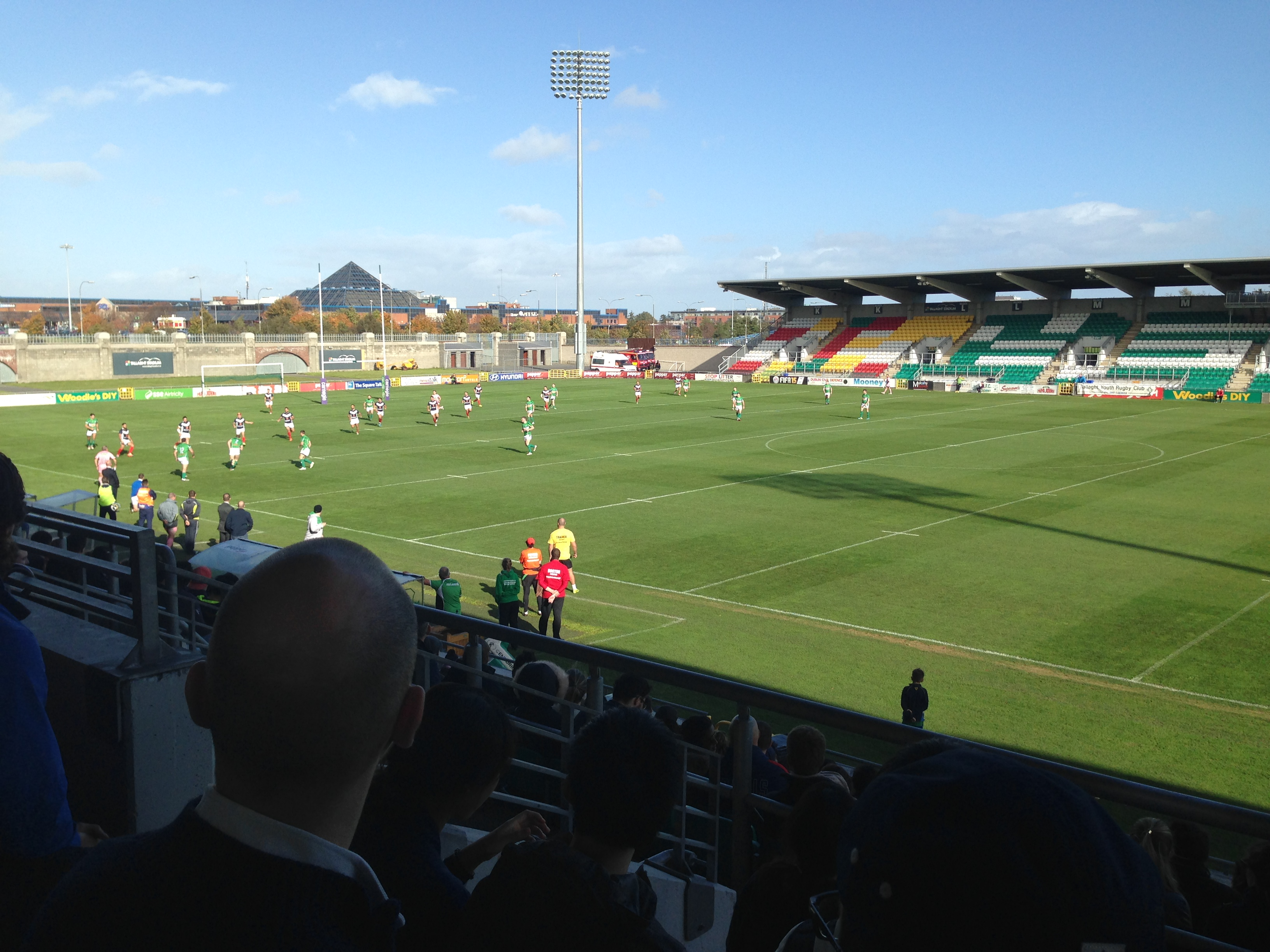
Tallaght Stadium Rugby League Ireland vs France 2014 Rugby League European Championship

International Rugby League Matches
Date	Home	Score	Opponent	Competition	Attendance	Report
24 October 2010	Ireland	22–42	Scotland	2010 European Cup	684	
18 October 2014	Ireland	22–12	France	2014 European Championship	1,428	
25 October 2014	Ireland	4–25	Scotland	2014 European Championship		

=== Rugby union ===
The stadium hosted its first rugby international game when a crowd of 4,016 saw the Ireland A national rugby union team defeat their Argentinian counterparts in November, 2009. The first club rugby game was held in August 2012, as 2011–12 Heineken Cup winners Leinster Rugby beat Gloucester Rugby in a preseason friendly.

Rugby Union Matches
Date	Home	Score	Opponent	Competition	Attendance	Report
27 November 2009	Ireland A	31–0	Argentina Jaguars	2009 end-of-year rugby union internationals	4,016	
25 August 2012	Leinster	33–22	(England) Gloucester	Friendly		
17 March 2025	Blackrock College	14–9	Terenure College	Leinster Schools Senior Cup final		
13 September 2025	Leinster	10–31	(Wales) Cardiff Blues	Friendly		
20 September 2026	Ireland	36–40	United States	2026 WXV Global Series	3,755	

=== American football ===
The 2010 Shamrock Bowl, the final of the Irish American Football League, was held on 7 August 2010. Dublin Rebels defeated the University of Limerick Vikings 15–0. The final was expected to be played in Tallaght again in 2011, should a Dublin-based team reach the final however Morton Stadium was selected over Tallaght Stadium to host the 2011 Final. The 2012 Shamrock Bowl was played in Tallaght on 14 July 2012, with Belfast Trojans triumphant.

In June, 2013, the EFAF Atlantic Cup was held at Tallaght Stadium.

== Other uses ==
During the COVID-19 pandemic, Tallaght Stadium was used as a drive-through test centre.

Preceded by Cooke RFC	Host of the Shamrock Bowl; 2010	Succeeded by Morton Stadium
Preceded by Turners Cross	Host of the Setanta Sports Cup Final; 2010; 2011	Succeeded by TBD
