= DCU Saints =

The DCU Saints may refer to:

- DCU Saints (American football)
- DCU Saints (basketball)
