= Shamrock Bowl =

Irish American football championship game

- Sport: American football
- Awarded for: Playoff champion of American Football Ireland (AFI)
- Country: Republic of Ireland, Northern Ireland

History
- First award: 1986
- First winner: Craigavon Cowboys
- Most wins: Dublin Rebels (10)
- Most recent: Louth Mavericks (1st)

The Shamrock Bowl is the championship game of the American Football Ireland (AFI), the highest level of American football on the island of Ireland, culminating a season that begins in March of the current calendar season. The Shamrock Bowl uses Roman numerals to identify each game, similar to the Super Bowl.

The reigning champions are the Louth Mavericks, who beat the Belfast Trojans 40-16 at Dubarry Park to win Shamrock Bowl XXXVIII on July 18, 2026.

== History ==
From 1986 to 1999, the Shamrock Bowl served as the championship game of the Irish American Football League (IAFL). This era was dominated by a handful of teams—namely the Craigavon Cowboys, Dublin Celts, Dublin Tornadoes, and Carrickfergus Knights—with at least one of these four teams appearing in every final and each securing multiple titles.

Following the re-establishment of the competition under the Irish American Football Association (since rebranded as American Football Ireland) in 2001, the landscape of the Shamrock Bowl shifted. This modern era has been defined by the dominance of several programs, most notably the Dublin Rebels, who have secured a record 10 titles, and the Belfast Trojans, who have claimed the championship 6 times.

The format of the American Football Ireland (AFI) playoffs has varied over the years but generally involves the top-ranked teams from the Premier Division competing in a postseason bracket. As of 2025, the current format features a four-team playoff, with semifinal matches hosted at the home fields of the top two seeds. The winners advance to the Shamrock Bowl, which is played at a neutral venue as part of a triple-header championship event that also includes the Division 1 Harp Bowl and the women's flag football Claddagh Bowl.

== Results ==
No.	Year	Date	Winner	Result	Runner-up	Venue	MVP	Position	References
I	1986	5 October 1986	Craigavon Cowboys	6–2	Dublin Celts	St Mary's RFC Templeville road Dublin	Nigel Trimble	Running back	
II	1987		Dublin Celts	43–25	Craigavon Cowboys	North RFC Belfast			
III	1988		Dublin Celts	34–6	Belfast Blitzers	Terenure College RFC			
IV	1989	5 November 1989	Dublin Celts	7–6	Antrim Bulldogs	Musgrave Park Belfast			
V (Note: The 1990 Shamrock Bowl is disputed between the Craigavon Cowboys and the Dublin Celts. In 1990, the Celts elected to play in the second tier of the BAFL as well as playing unofficially against Irish teams. Meanwhile, the Cowboys won the Irish league competition, defeating the Belfast Spartans 31-6 in the final on August 11. At the end of the season, a match was organised between the Cowboys and Celts, which the Celts won 40-0.)	1990	11 August 1990	Craigavon Cowboys	31–6	Belfast Spartans	Goodyear sports and conference centre, Craigavon			
V	1990	1 September 1990	Dublin Celts	40–0	Craigavon Cowboys	Goodyear sports and conference centre, Craigavon			
VI	1991		Dublin Celts	44–0	Antrim Bulldogs	Drogheda RFC Drogheda Co. Louth			
VII	1992		Craigavon Cowboys	14–6	Antrim Bulldogs	Cooke Rugby Club, Belfast			
VIII	1993		Dublin Tornadoes	22–2	Dublin Celts	Iveagh Grounds			
IX	1994		Dublin Tornadoes	21–15	Carrickfergus Knights	Pat Jennings Park, Newry, Co Down			
X	1995		Dublin Tornadoes	34–12	Carrickfergus Knights	Islandbridge, Dublin	Tornadoes offensive line (shared)	Offensive line	
XI	1996		Dublin Lightning	26–8	Dublin Tornadoes	St. Marys RFC, Dublin			
XII	1997		Carrickfergus Knights	21–0	Dublin Bulls	Queens University Belfast			
XIII	1998	30 August 1998	Carrickfergus Knights	22–14	Dublin Tigers	Woodburn Playing Fields, Carrickfergus			
XIV	1999	29 August 1999	Dublin Tigers	22–6	Carrickfergus Knights	Sportslink, Santry, Dublin			
—N/a	2000	not played							
XV	2001	16 December 2001	Dublin Rebels	28–7	Carrickfergus Knights	Woodburn Playing Fields, Carrickfergus	Brian Dennehy	Running back	
XVI	2002	16 June 2002	Carrickfergus Knights	66–0	UL Vikings	University Bowl, Limerick			
XVII	2003	10 August 2003	Dublin Rebels	24–12	Carrickfergus Knights	JJ McDowell Memorial Ground, Dublin	Brian Dennehy	Running back	
XVIII	2004	29 August 2004	Dublin Rebels	24–22	Carrickfergus Knights	Dr. Hickey Park, Greystones			
XIX	2005	28 August 2005	Dublin Rebels	26–19	Belfast Bulls	Grafton Arena, Deramore Park, Belfast	Andrew Dennehy	Quarterback	
XX	2006	20 August 2006	Dublin Rebels	44–12	UL Vikings	Sportslink, Dublin	Ross McCooey	Linebacker	
XXI	2007	29 July 2007	UL Vikings	22–14	Cork Admirals	UL Sports Ground, Limerick	Seamus Hogan	Running Back/Safety	
XXII	2008	10 August 2008	UL Vikings	14–12	Dublin Rebels	CIT Stadium, Cork	Adrian Garvey	Running Back	
XXIII	2009	9 August 2009	UL Vikings	9–6(OT)	Dublin Rebels	Cooke Rugby Club, Belfast	Adrian Garvey	Running Back	
XXIV	2010	7 August 2010	Dublin Rebels	15–0	UL Vikings	Tallaght Stadium, Dublin	Brian Carter	Safety	
XXV	2011	31 July 2011	Dublin Rebels	14–13	UL Vikings	Morton Stadium, Dublin	Marcus Naylor	Safety	
XXVI	2012	14 July 2012	Belfast Trojans	16–14	UL Vikings	Tallaght Stadium, Dublin	Neil Mongomery	Fullback	
XXVII	2013	20 July 2013	Belfast Trojans	48–18	Dublin Rebels	Tallaght Stadium, Dublin	Neil Montgomery	Fullback	
XXVIII	2014	10 August 2014	Belfast Trojans	7–0	Trinity College	Tallaght Stadium, Dublin	Connor Whitla	Linebacker	
XXIX	2015	9 August 2015	Belfast Trojans	28–14	Trinity College	Dalymount Park, Dublin	Dave Colvin	Running Back	
XXX	2016	7 August 2016	Dublin Rebels	12–7	Belfast Trojans	Tallaght Stadium, Dublin	Conrad Cook	Linebacker	
XXXI	2017	13 August 2017	Dublin Rebels	12–6	Carrickfergus Knights	Tallaght Stadium, Dublin	Wellington Omorodion	Running Back	
XXXII	2018	19 August 2018	Cork Admirals	18–16	Dublin Rebels	Tallaght Stadium, Dublin	Harris Monaghan	Linebacker	
XXXIII	2019	4 August 2019	Belfast Trojans	24–10	South Dublin Panthers	Energia Park, Donnybrook, Dublin	Thomas Morris	Wide receiver	
—N/a	2020	not played							
—N/a	2021	not played							
XXXIV	2022	7 August 2022	UCD American Football	52–24	Dublin Rebels	Kingspan Stadium, Belfast	Tom Donovan	Wide receiver	
XXXV	2023	16 July 2023	Dublin Rebels	40–34	UCD American Football	MTU Stadium, Cork	Ty Henry	Quarterback	
XXXVI	2024	28 July 2024	UCD American Football	36–14	Dublin Rebels	Dubarry Park, Athlone, Westmeath	Tom Donovan	Wide receiver	
XXXVII	2025	19 July 2025	Belfast Trojans	27–0	UCD American Football	Dubarry Park, Athlone, Westmeath	Rayshawn Boswell	Running Back	
XXXVIII	2026	18 July 2026	Louth Mavericks	40–16	Belfast Trojans	Dubarry Park, Athlone, Westmeath	Oisin Finn	Wide receiver	

== Appearances by team ==
Appearances	Team (Note: Bold indicate currently active team)	Wins	Losses	Season(s) (Note: Bold years indicate winning seasons, italic years indicate games not yet played.)
16	Dublin Rebels	10	6	2001, 2003, 2004, 2005, 2006, 2008, 2009, 2010, 2011, 2013, 2016, 2017, 2018, 2022, 2023, 2024
10	Carrickfergus Knights	3	7	1994, 1995, 1997, 1998, 1999, 2001, 2002, 2003, 2004, 2017
8	UL Vikings	3	5	2002, 2006, 2007, 2008, 2009, 2010, 2011, 2012
8	Belfast Trojans	6	2	2012, 2013, 2014, 2015, 2016, 2019, 2025, 2026
7	Dublin Celts	5	2	1986, 1987, 1988, 1989, 1990, 1991, 1993
4	Dublin Tornadoes	3	1	1993, 1994, 1995, 1996
4	Craigavon Cowboys	3	1	1986, 1987, 1990, 1992
4	UCD American Football	2	2	2022, 2023, 2024, 2025
3	Antrim Bulldogs	0	3	1989, 1991, 1992
2	Cork Admirals	1	1	2007, 2018
2	Dublin Tigers	1	1	1998, 1999
2	Trinity College	0	2	2014, 2015
1	Dublin Lightning	1	0	1996
1	Louth Mavericks	1	0	2026
1	Belfast Blitzers	0	1	1988
1	Dublin Bulls	0	1	1997
1	Belfast Bulls	0	1	2005
1	South Dublin Panthers	0	1	2019
