= Northwest Vipers =

- Founded: 2014
- League: American Football Ireland (Division 1)
- Based in: Derry and County Donegal
- Stadium: City of Derry RFC, Judges Road, Derry
- President: Dan Danowski
- Website: northwestvipers.com

The Northwest Vipers are an American football club based across Derry, Northern Ireland, and County Donegal, Republic of Ireland. The club competes in Division 1 of American Football Ireland (AFI) and plays its home games at City of Derry RFC.

== History ==
The club was founded in 2014 by Cathal Curran as the Donegal/Derry Vipers, a cross-border team drawing players from both sides of the Donegal–Derry border. The team was promoted to the AFI's second tier (then known as IAFA1) in 2017.

For its first several years, the club lacked a permanent home ground, playing at venues including Letterkenny, Limavady Rugby Club, the Vale Centre in Greysteel, Lisnagelvin, and Prehen Playing Fields. In 2022, the club settled at City of Derry RFC's grounds on Judges Road after an agreement with City of Derry Rugby Club.

The 2021 season was cancelled, but the club continued to develop, hosting and winning the Donaghy Group Invitational Cup. In 2024, the club rebranded from Donegal/Derry Vipers to Northwest Vipers, reflecting its ambition to represent the wider northwest region.

In 2026, the Vipers reached their first Harp Bowl final, defeating West Dublin Rhinos 23–21 in the semi-final. The club lost the final 60–6 to South Dublin Panthers at Dubarry Park on 18 July 2026.
