= DCU Saints (American football) =

- First season: 2006
- Location: Dublin, Ireland
- Stadium: DCU Sports Grounds (capacity: n/a)
- League: IAFL
- Conference: Shamrock Bowl Conference
- Colors: Blue and Gold
- All-time record: 12–26–2 (.325)
- Bowl record: 0–2 (.000)

The Dublin City University Saints was an American football team of Dublin City University, Ireland. Established in 2005, the DCU Saints initially competed in the Irish American Football League (IAFL) for five seasons, reaching the playoffs in 2008 and 2009. The team collapsed following the conclusion of the league's 2010 season, before attempting unsuccessfully to reform for the 2013 season.

== Colours ==
The DCU Saints followed a similar colour scheme to other Dublin City University (DCU) clubs: royal blue and gold. The team had both home and away strips: the home being navy blue and gold; the away white and gold.

== History ==
The DCU American football club was established in 2005. The club initially provided flag football training and access to some of the NFL games. As with all new clubs and societies at DCU, the club had to undergo a probationary period. During this time the club was focused on allowing fans of the sport learn more about it and to establish itself as a viable club in the university.

In 2006, interest in the club increased, and over 150 students signed up to the club at the start of the university year. In 2006, the club also applied to and was accepted by the IAFL and began training DCU's first ever fully kitted American football team, the "DCU Saints".

Between 2006 and 2010, the club played in several IAFL competitions, before disbanding. In 2013, after a 3-year absence from the IAFL, DCU attempted to re-enter the IAFL Shamrock Bowl Conference. However, the club disbanded prior to the start of that season.

== Records ==
Year	Wins	Losses	Ties	Points	Result
2006	1	7	0	2	7th overall
2007	2	6	0	4	Tied 2nd in IAFL Central (tied 7th overall)
2008	4	4	0	8	2nd in IAFL Central (5th overall); Knocked out of playoffs in wildcard round by Cork Admirals
2009	3	4	1	7	4th overall Knocked out of playoffs by Dublin Rebels
2010	2	5	1	4	4th in IAFL Central (tied 9th overall)
