= Cork Admirals =

American football team in Ireland

- Founded: 2002
- League: American Football Ireland, Premier Division
- Based in: Cork, Ireland
- Stadium: Old Christians RFC, Glanmire
- Colors: Red and White
- Championships: IAFL1 Bowl 2016 Shamrock Bowl XXXII 2018
- Website: www.corkadmirals.ie

The Cork Admirals American Football Club, commonly known as The Admirals, is an amateur American football club based in Cork City, County Cork in Ireland. They compete in the American Football Ireland (AFI) Premier Division, the top tier of American football in Ireland. In domestic American football, the club have won one Shamrock Bowl, a Division 1 Championship Bowl, a Premier Division Shield and four Youth National Championships.

The Admirals were formed in 2002 in Cork City and are the only senior and youth kitted club in County Cork. The Admirals started competing during 2002 and reached its first Shamrock Bowl final in 2007 (Shamrock Bowl XXI) which they lost against to the Dublin Rebels. The Admirals achieved their first piece of silverware in 2016, winning the Division 1 Championship. The Admirals won their first and only Shamrock Bowl in 2018 (Shamrock Bowl XXXII) against the Dublin Rebels. The youth team won 4 National Championships from 2018 to 2022. The Admirals were the first team to win the Premier Division Shield in 2024.

== History ==
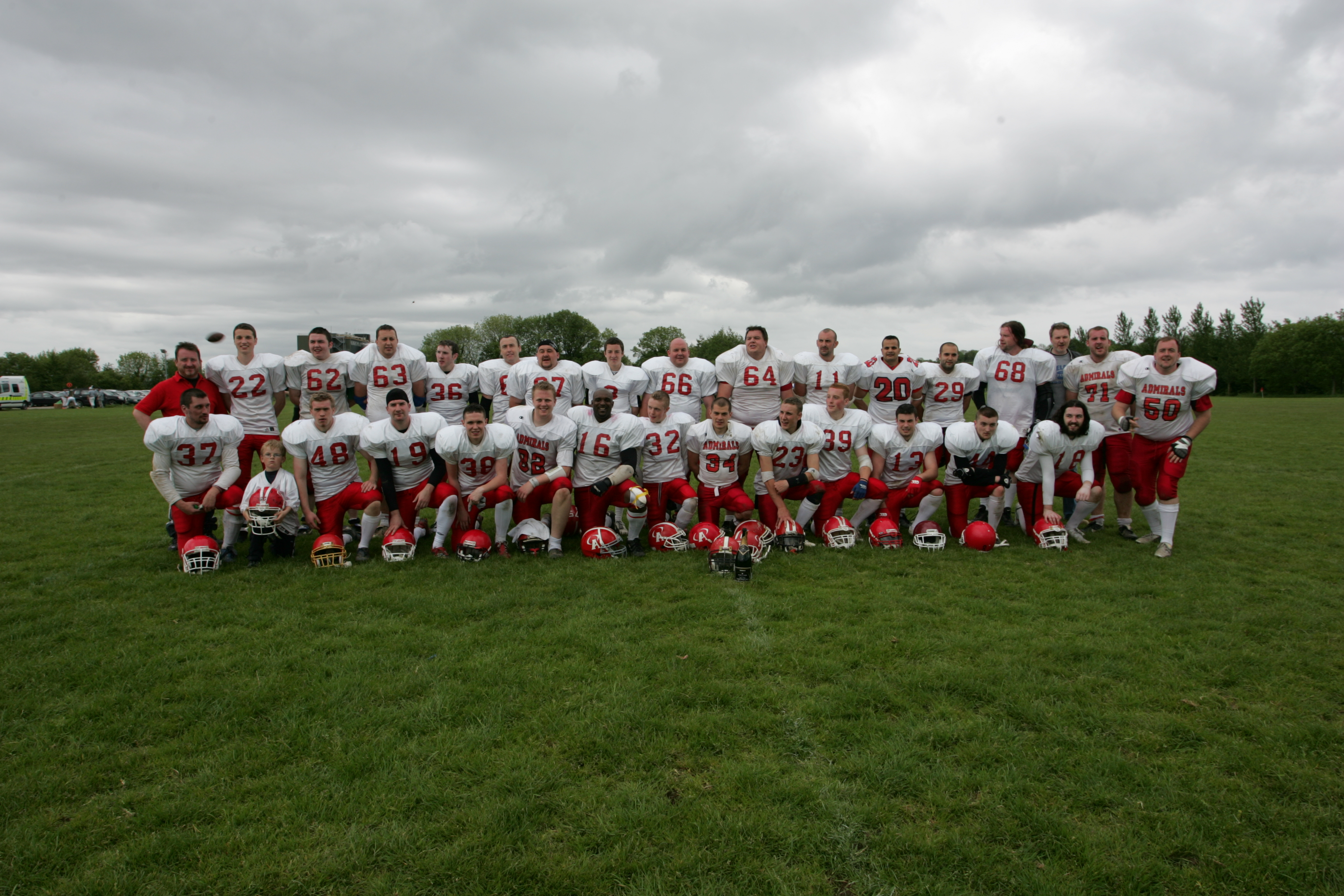
Members of the team in 2006

The Admirals first game, in December 2002, was an 8-a-side challenge match that resulted in a 28–18 defeat to the Dublin Rebels. Despite the loss, the team stepped up to 11-a-side for the next two friendly matches. Both these games resulted in defeat for the Admirals, going down 26–12 to the Dublin Rebels and 8–0 to the Dublin Dragons.

In the 2003 season, the club's first season of IAFL league play, the team managed only a 1–5 record. The first victory came in the spring of 2003, defeating the UL Vikings in an 8-a-side contest. The club would get its first 11-a-side victories against the same side that winter in two challenge games.

The following year saw the Cork Admirals improve to a 3–5 record in the expanded IAFL. Despite this, the Dublin Dragons, with a similar 3–5 record, beat the Admirals to the final playoff spot. The final game of that season was the Admirals best performance, beating the Dublin Dragons 68–20 at Pfizer Sports Grounds.

The Admirals held a recruitment drive ahead of the 2004 season, and the team (which included some rookies) had a win against Limerick in a November challenge game. The Admirals 2004 season got off to a poor start when the U.L. Vikings recorded their first ever win over the Cork side. This started a four-game losing spell for the Admirals. However, the Admirals won three of their final four contests later in the 2004-2005 season, including two home wins to clinch a playoff spot. The Belfast Bulls, league winners in 2005, proved too strong for the Admirals in the playoff, however, ending the Admirals hopes for a Shamrock Bowl berth that season.

In May 2013, the Admirals encountered problems with players numbers and briefly halted playing operations.

However, they have now made a return and made the IAFL-1 Bowl final but losing out to UCD 40–0.

They returned to the IAFL-1 Bowl final in 2015 but lost out to Waterford Wolves on a scoreline of 13–12.

Having won the IAFL-1 with an undefeated season in 2016, they re-entered the Shamrock Bowl Conference for 2017.

=== Alan Lomasney years (2016-2024) ===
Alan Lomasney became The Admirals head coach during the 2016 preseason on 3 March 2016. Along with Lomasney, Trevor O'Connell was appointed as the line coach, Sean McKnight as the defensive coordinator and Luke O'Brien as the joint special teams and defensive backs coach. This was the first time since 2013 that The Admirals had a non-playing coaching staff.

==== 2016 Season - AFI Division 1 Champions (8-0 Regular Season) ====
Lomasney's first season in charge saw The Admirals go through the regular season undefeated, ending the season with an 8-0 record. The most notable games being the 24-0 shut out against the South Kildare Soldiers and defeating the joint league leaders Westmeath Minotaurs 36-14, to go 4-0 and become the league leaders. The Admirals finished the regular season with a 14-7 win over their Munster rivals, the Waterford Wolves. The Admirals went on to the AFI Division 1 playoffs against the Westmeath Minotaurs in a blowout game, where The Admirals won 30-00. Advancing to the AFI Division 1 Championship Bowl game for the third consecutive year in a row, The Admirals beat the Belfast Trojans 38-7 to crown them champions and promotion back to the AFI Premier Division.

2016 AFI Division 1 Regular Season
Game	Home	Score	Away	Result
1	Waterford Wolves	03-30	Cork Admirals	W (1-0)
2	Cork Admirals	24-00	South Kildare Soldiers	W (2-0)
3	South Kildare Soldiers	00-50	Cork Admirals	W (3-0)
4	Westmeath Minotaurs	13-20	Cork Admirals	W (4-0)
5	Cork Admirals	36-14	West Dublin Rhinos	W (5-0)
6	Meath Bulldogs	13-30	Cork Admirals	W (6-0)
7	Cork Admirals	22-09	Louth Mavericks	W (7-0)
8	Cork Admirals	14-07	Waterford Wolves	W (8-0)

2016 AFI Division 1 Playoff			2016 AFI Division 1 Bowl Game		
Home	Score	Away	Home	Score	Away
Cork Admirals	30-00	Westmeath Minotaurs	Cork Admirals	38-07	Belfast Trojans
Advanced to finals		Knocked out	Champions		Runners up

== Finals appearances ==
=== Shamrock Bowl XXI ===
In 2007, the Admirals made their first Shamrock Bowl with a victory over the Dublin Rebels 8–6 in the semifinals. The team faced IAFL South division rivals, the UL Vikings. In a very tight contest, the Admirals were unable to beat the Vikings. The game finished 22–14.

=== Shamrock Bowl XXXII ===
In 2018, the Admirals returned to the Shamrock Bowl after an 11-year gap to their last appearance. The (5-3) Admirals took on the (6-2) Dublin Rebels in Tallaght Stadium on 19 August. The Admirals took the lead in the 1st quarter. The XP was missed, however. With just seconds left in the 1st half, the Admirals scored again. The trick play 2PAT was unsuccessful and Admirals went into the break leading 12–0. The 3rd quarter was mostly a defensive stalemate but the game exploded into life in the final quarter. Ultimately the Admirals won the game and were crowned Shamrock Bowl XXXII and National Champions.

== Honours ==
The Admirals first honour was the AFI Division 1 Championship in 2016, gaining the club promotion into the AFI Premier Division. 2018 was the next honours the club earned, when the club won Shamrock Bowl XXXII against the Dublin Rebels in a 18-16 win. The Admirals youth team began a "dominant era" in the AFI Youth National Championship, earning their honours from 2018 to 2022. As of 2024, the most recent honour for The Admirals was the AFI Premier Shield in 2024.

Competition	Titles	Seasons
AFI Premier Division	1	2018
AFI First Division	1	2016
AFI Premier Division Shield	1	2024
AFI Youth National Championship	4	2018, 2019, 2021, 2022
