= Drogheda Lightning =

Irish-American football team

General information
- Founded: 2010
- Folded: 2014
- Stadium: St. Olivers Community College
- Headquartered: Drogheda, County Louth, Ireland

League / conference affiliations
- Irish American Football League; IAFL-1

Championships
- Division championships: 0 DV8s (1) - 2011

Uniform

Drogheda Lightning was an Irish American Football team based in the town of Drogheda, County Louth, Ireland. They played in the second tier of Ireland's American football league system. The team played their home games at St. Oliver's Community College in Rathmullen, Drogheda. Founded in 2010, Drogheda Lightning competed in the IAFL DV8s Division (now defunct) in 2011 and 2012. Following the restructuring of the Irish American Football League structure ahead of the 2013 season, they competed in the newly created IAFL-1 Division from March 2013.

The team disbanded after the 2014 season.

== Rivalries ==
The Lightning's traditional rivals were seen to be the Trim based Meath Bulldogs (formerly Trim Bulldogs). Both sides entered the IAFL at the same time.

Drogheda Lightning and Meath Bulldogs met nine times with the Lightning holding a 4–5 win–loss record. The first competitive meeting of the teams occurred on 15 May 2011 in Trim from which Drogheda emerging 32-6 victors. The Lightning would go on to do the double over their near neighbours when the teams met in Drogheda just two months later, running out 40-0 victors on this occasion.

In a repeat of their 2012 schedule, Drogheda began their 2012 DV8s campaign with a trip to Trim and came away with a victory; this time by a tighter 32–26 margin. Later in 2012, the sides met again in what has been the only exhibition game between the clubs. Another hard fought tie ensued, from which the Bulldogs picked up their first win against Drogheda on a 28–26 scoreline. Just a month later, the sides met for the third time in the calendar year, the return leg of their DV8s championship season, from which Drogheda once more emerged victorious by a 31–21 margin, clinching the division title in the process.
