= South Dublin Panthers =

American Football team in Dublin, Ireland

- Founded: 2001
- League: American Football Ireland
- Based in: Dublin, Ireland
- Stadium: Tymon Park, Tallaght
- Colors: Navy, Gold and White
- Chairman: Ben Arulogun
- Head coach: Eoin O'Sullivan

The South Dublin Panthers, formerly known as the Dublin Dragons, are an American Football team formed in 2001. They compete in American Football Ireland. The team is based in Tymon Park in Dublin. In addition to the senior full-kitted men's team, the Panthers also field sides in youth leagues, co-ed flag football, and a women's team that competes in AFI's Claddagh league. They play their home matches at Westmanstown.

== History ==
Originally formed in 2001 as the Dublin Dragons, the team was rebranded as the South Dublin Panthers in 2014. In 2018, the Panthers qualified for the Shamrock Bowl playoffs for the first time, losing to eventual champions Cork Admirals. In 2019, the Panthers defeated the Cork Admirals in the semifinal to qualify for their first Shamrock Bowl final, where they were defeated by the Belfast Trojans 24–10.

The Panthers were relegated from the Premier Division in 2025, but bounced back in 2026 by securing the one-seed of Division One in the regular season, winning their playoff semifinal over the Westmeath Minotaurs 54-7, and winning Harp Bowl XI over the Northwest Vipers by a score of 60-6.

The Panthers women's flag team began play in the inaugural season of the AFI Claddagh League in 2024, and claimed back-to-back-to-back national titles in Claddagh Bowls I (2024), II (2025), and III (2026).

== Honours ==
- Shamrock Bowl Finalists (1): 2019
- Harp Bowl Winners (1): XI (2026)
- Claddagh Bowl Winners (3): I (2024), II (2025), III (2026)
