= University of Limerick Vikings =

- Sport: American Football
- School: University of Limerick
- Founded: 1999
- Location: Limerick, Ireland
- Colors: Blue and Yellow
- Head coach: Darragh O'Callaghan

The University of Limerick Vikings are an American football team in Limerick, Ireland. The team is affiliated with the University of Limerick, and compete in American Football Ireland (AFI). The team currently competes in AFI's top-level Premier Division. The Vikings have won three AFI Shamrock Bowl titles – in 2007, 2008 and 2009, as well as winning the EFAF Atlantic Cup in 2010. The Vikings also won their first AFI Division 1 Bowl in 2023, concluding a perfect 10-0 season and securing their promotion to the Premier division. While mainly competing in the AFI Premier Division, the team also plays flag football in the Emerald Bowl South. They competed in their first international flag tournament in 2026, placing 6th at the Copenhagen Bowl in Denmark.

== History ==
=== Formation and early years ===
Established in 1999, the team played mostly flag football until late 2001, when they joined the IAFL winter league. In UL's first-ever game, they took the field on the road to the eventual Shamrock Bowl champion Dublin Rebels and were beaten 48–0. The Vikings lost their first four games, but on 2 December 2001, they recorded their first-ever win, 12–8, over the Dublin Dragons in Limerick.

In 2002, the Vikings won every game they played thanks to a team of mostly American exchange students. As league champions, they progressed directly to the Shamrock Bowl. However, as most of the American students had returned home, UL was well beaten by the Carrickfergus Knights, 66–0. The 2003 and 2004 seasons were devoted to building a base of home-grown Irish players, and in 2005 the Vikings broke their three-year, 13-game losing streak with a 26–22 victory over rival Cork Admirals.

=== Late 2000s to 2010 ===
The UL Vikings finished the 2006 season with a 5–2–1 record, led by their defence, which gave up only 6 points in five home games. The Vikings made the postseason for the first time in four years and defeated the Carrickfergus Knights on the road to make the Shamrock Bowl for the second time. However, a strong Dublin Rebels team upended the Vikings 44–12 to claim their fourth consecutive Shamrock Bowl victory.

In the 2007 season, the Vikings won every game they played and entered the playoffs as Shamrock Bowl favourites. Reaching the final, they contested the first all-Munster Shamrock Bowl against the Cork Admirals, which was held at the UL Sports Grounds on 29 July 2007. The Vikings won a close fought match by a margin of 22–14 and claimed their first-ever Shamrock Bowl title.

The Vikings finished the 2008 regular season with a 7–1 record, winning their second consecutive Southern Division title. The sole loss came at home at the hands of fellow Shamrock Bowl finalists Dublin Rebels. The Vikings finished the 2008 season as the number two seeds and, after defeating the Belfast Trojans 42–8 in the semi-final, proceeded to their third consecutive Shamrock Bowl. The bowl took place on 10 August 2008 at CIT Stadium in Cork against the number one seeded Dublin Rebels. The Vikings had a 14–3 lead going into half-time, and thanks to a blocked field goal in the fourth quarter, the Vikings won their second Shamrock Bowl in two years, defeating the Rebels 14–12.

In 2009, the UL Vikings finished as the number two seed for the third year in a row. They met the Carrickfergus Knights at home in the semi-finals. Leading 20–0 at half time, the game was abandoned shortly after the break when a Knights player was seriously injured, and the Vikings advanced to their fourth Shamrock Bowl in a row. The Vikings met the Dublin Rebels in Belfast for Shamrock Bowl XXIII. The score was tied at 6–6 after four-quarters, which meant the Shamrock Bowl would go into overtime for the first time in the game's history. In overtime, UL's kicker successfully converted a field goal and the Vikings claimed their third Shamrock Bowl in three years.

In 2010, the Vikings reached the playoffs for a fifth successive year. Their only defeat once again came at the hands of the Dublin Rebels. In June 2010, the Vikings won their first international title, by winning the second EFAF Atlantic Cup, held in Dublin. This win, along with their domestic performances, elevated the Vikings into the EFAF Top 20 rankings for the first time in the team's history, debuting at No. 19. The Vikings success in the Atlantic Cup resulted in them being named the IFAF "Team of the Month" for June 2010 – the first Irish team to win this award. The Vikings proceeded to their fifth Shamrock Bowl in five years by beating the Carrickfergus Knights 20–0 in their 2010 Shamrock Bowl semi-final. The Vikings failed to make it four Shamrock Bowl victories in a row as they lost in the Shamrock Bowl to the Dublin Rebels, 15–0.

=== 2020s ===
In 2023, the Vikings recorded a perfect 10-0 season, winning the AFI Division One title and regaining promotion to the Premier Division, beating the Louth Mavericks 6-2. In flag, the team reached the final of the Glas Bowl in 2025, losing out to the University of Ulster Elks, before ultimately getting revenge in their next meeting at Intervarsities in 2026, beating the Elks 23-12.

== Season-by-season records ==
Note: W = Wins, L = Losses, T = Ties

=== Tackle football ===
Year	W	L	T	Finish	Playoff results
2001	1	5	0	4th IAFL	–
2002	5	1	0	1st IAFL	Lost Shamrock Bowl XVI (Knights)
2003	0	3	0	3rd IAFL Division 2	–
2004	0	8	0	6th IAFL	–
2005	3	5	0	5th IAFL	–
2006	5	2	1	3rd IAFL	Lost Shamrock Bowl XX (Rebels)
2007	7	1	0	1st IAFL Southern Division	Won Shamrock Bowl XXI (Admirals)
2008	7	1	0	1st IAFL Southern Division	Won Shamrock Bowl XXII (Rebels)
2009	6	1	1	2nd IAFL	Won Shamrock Bowl XXIII (Rebels)
2010	6	1	1	1st IAFL Southern Division	Lost Shamrock Bowl XXIV (Rebels)
2011	8	0	0	1st IAFL Southern Division	Lost Shamrock Bowl XXV (Rebels)
2012	8	0	0	1st IAFL	Lost Shamrock Bowl XXVI (Trojans)
2013	6	2	0	2nd IAFL Southern Division	Lost Shamrock Bowl Semi-final (Trojans)
2014	6	2	0	2nd IAFL Southern Division	Lost Shamrock Bowl Semi-final (Trojans)
2015	6	2	0	2nd IAFL Southern Division	Lost Shamrock Bowl Semi-final (Trojans)
2016	6	1	1	2nd IAFL Southern Division	Lost Shamrock Bowl Semi-final (Dublin Rebels)
2017	7	1	0	2nd IAFL Southern Division	Lost Shamrock Bowl Semi-final (Carrickfergus Knights)
2018	2	6	0	4th IAFL Southern Division	–
2019	3	5	0	5th IAFL	–
2022	5	2	1	2nd AFI Division 1	Lost AFI Division One Bowl (Westmeath Minotaurs)
2023	8	0	0	1st AFI Division 1	Won AFI Division One Bowl (Louth Mavericks)
2024	1	6	1	7th AFI Premier Division	–
2025	1	6	1	7th AFI Premier Division	–
2026	3	5	0	5th AFI Premier Division	–

=== Flag football ===
Year	W	L	T	Finish	Playoff results	Intervarsity results
2024	6	4	0	1st AFI Mixed Flag Division One South	Lost wildcard game (Cork Admirals)	Lost semi-final (Maynooth Hurricanes)
2025	7	1	0	2nd AFI Mixed Flag Division One South/Central	Lost Glas Bowl (University of Ulster Elks)	Won Intervarsity final (University of Ulster Elks)
