= Craigavon Cowboys =

Logo

General information
- Founded: 1986
- Stadium: Lurgan Rugby Club, Lurgan
- Headquartered: Craigavon, Northern Ireland
- Colors: Orange and Black
- Website: craigavoncowboys.co.uk

League / conference affiliations
- Irish American Football League

Championships
- League championships: 0; 1986, 1990, 1992 Shamrock Bowl Champions

The Craigavon Cowboys are an American football team playing in Craigavon, County Armagh, who compete in American Football Ireland. They have won the Shamrock Bowl three times in addition to other silverware.

== History ==
The club initiated play in 1986, competing in the Irish American Football League (IAFL, now AFI). The Cowboys had success in the league in this period, winning the inaugural Shamrock Bowl in 1986 as well as additional championships in 1990 (Note: According to the Irish American Football research project Eirball, the 1990 Shamrock Bowl is disputed between the Craigavon Cowboys and the Dublin Celts. In 1990, the Celts elected to play in the second tier of the BAFL as well as playing unofficially against Irish teams. Meanwhile, the Cowboys won the Irish league competition, defeating the Belfast Spartans 31-6 in the final on August 11. At the end of the season, a match was organised between the Cowboys and Celts, which the Celts won 40-0.) and 1992. This initial iteration of the club experienced a decline that ultimately led to the club folding in the mid 1990s.

The club reformed again in 2005, and initially played in AFI's lower-level competitions, winning the DV8 (Development) League in 2009 and Division 1 titles in 2019 and 2024. As of 2025, the Cowboys were competing in AFI's Premier Division, having won the inaugural Harp Bowl I in 2024 to secure promotion from Division 1.

== Honours ==
Senior Kitted

- 3x Shamrock Bowl Winners - I (1986), V (1990), VII (1992)
- 1x Shamrock Bowl Finalists - II (1987)
- 2x Harp Bowl Winners - VI (2019), IX (2024)
- 2x Harp Bowl Finalists - 2017, 2018
- IAFL DV8 Champions - 2009

Junior Kitted

- 2x IAFA Junior League Champions - 2014, 2015, 2025

Flag

- 3x Emerald Bowl Champions - 2016, 2018, 2021
- 1x Glas Bowl Champions - 2019
