= West Dublin Rhinos =

American football team in Ireland

- Founded: 2008
- League: Irish American Football League
- Team history: Dublin Rhinos (2008); West Dublin Rhinos (2009 - present)
- Based in: Dublin, Ireland
- Stadium: Castleknock College
- Colors: Red and Black
- Head coach: David Hosford
- Championships: 2018 IAFL1 Bowl
- Website: https://www.dublinrhinos.ie/

The West Dublin Rhinos are an American gridiron football team based at Castleknock College in Dublin. As of 2024, they were playing in Division 1 of American Football Ireland. As of 2023, their head coach was David Hosford.

When the Rhinos made their debut in the league, they were called the Dublin Rhinos. Beginning with the 2009 season, they were renamed the West Dublin Rhinos.
