= Belfast Trojans =

UK-based American football team

- Founded: 2006
- League: American Football Ireland
- Based in: Belfast, Northern Ireland
- Stadium: Belfast Harlequins / Deramore Park
- Colors: Green, Silver, White, Black
- Chairman: Barry Keil
- Head coach: Phil Gunning
- Championships: 2012, 2013, 2014, 2015, 2019, 2025 Shamrock Bowl Champions, 2013, 2015 Atlantic Cup Champions, 2015 IAFL2 Champions
- Mascot: Hector
- Website: www.belfasttrojans.com

The Belfast Trojans are an American Football team based in Belfast, Northern Ireland. They compete in the American Football Ireland (AFI) Premier Division. The Trojans are one of the most successful teams in Irish American football history, having won AFI's top-level Shamrock Bowl championship six times in addition to several European trophies. The Trojans play their home games at Deramore Park, the ground of the Belfast Harlequins Rugby Club.

== History ==
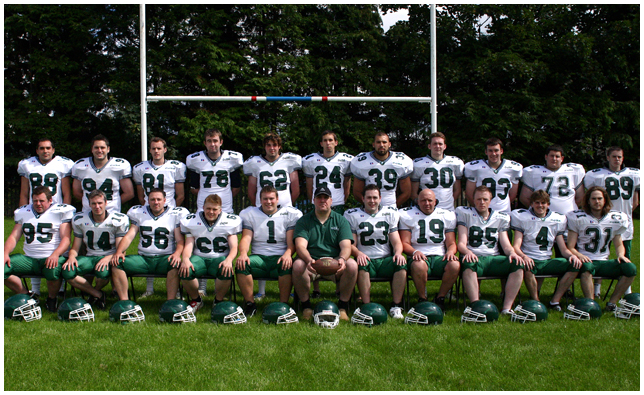
The 2007 Belfast Trojans in their inaugural season

The Belfast Trojans were founded in 2006 following the disbandment of the Belfast Bulls. The club began competing in the Irish American Football League (IAFL, since renamed AFI) in 2007. After compiling an even 3-3-2 record in their inaugural season, in 2008 the Trojans won the Northern Division and reached the semi-final playoff of the Shamrock Bowl.

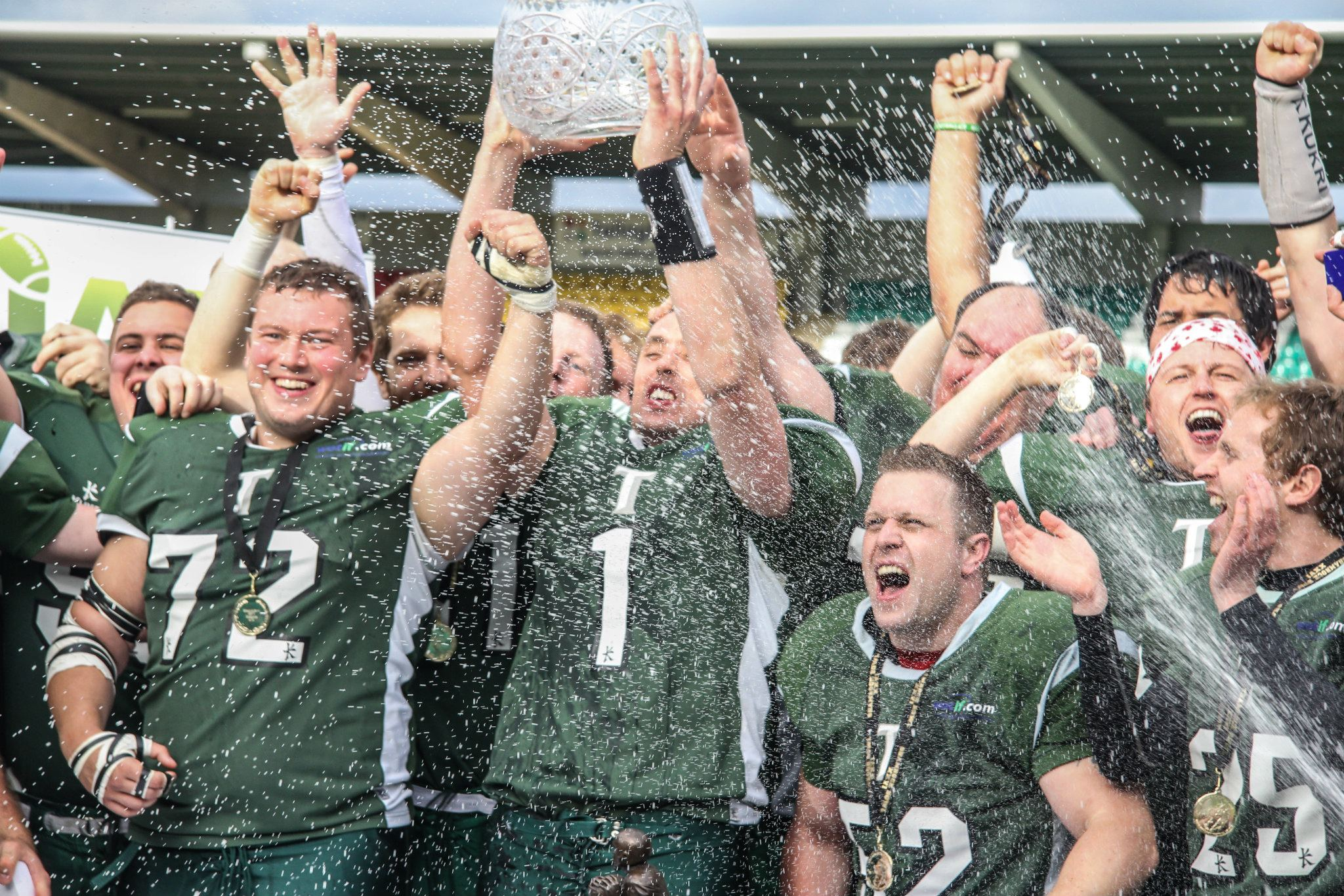
The Belfast Trojans celebrate winning their first Shamrock Bowl title in 2012

The team experienced improvements in 2011 through increased recruitment and development which laid the groundwork for a dynastic period from 2012 to 2016, in which the Trojans won four consecutive Shamrock Bowls (XXVI, XXVII, XXVIII, XXIX) and registered perfect seasons in domestic league play in 2012, 2013, and 2015 with an additional Shamrock Bowl appearance in 2016. They also had success in Europe in this era, winning the Atlantic Cup in both 2013 (EFAF) and 2015 (GFLI). In 2019, the team captured their fifth Shamrock Bowl title (XXXIII).

In 2015, the club expanded by launching a second senior team that competed in IAFL-2, winning the division title that same year. The Trojans also invested in flag football and youth development programs, establishing a flag football side in 2018, a youth development team in 2021, and a women's flag football team that participated in the inaugural season of the AFI Claddagh Bowl league in 2024.

After the return of the AFI after two cancelled seasons in 2020 and 2021, the club has since remained competitive in the AFI Premier Division. In 2025, the Trojans returned to the top of the league. In doing so, they registered a perfect 8–0 regular season and a 22–0 win over the Dublin Rebels in the playoff semifinal to qualify for Shamrock Bowl XXXVII against UCD. At the Shamrock Bowl final in Athlone, they defeated UCD 27–0 to earn their sixth national title.

== Achievements ==
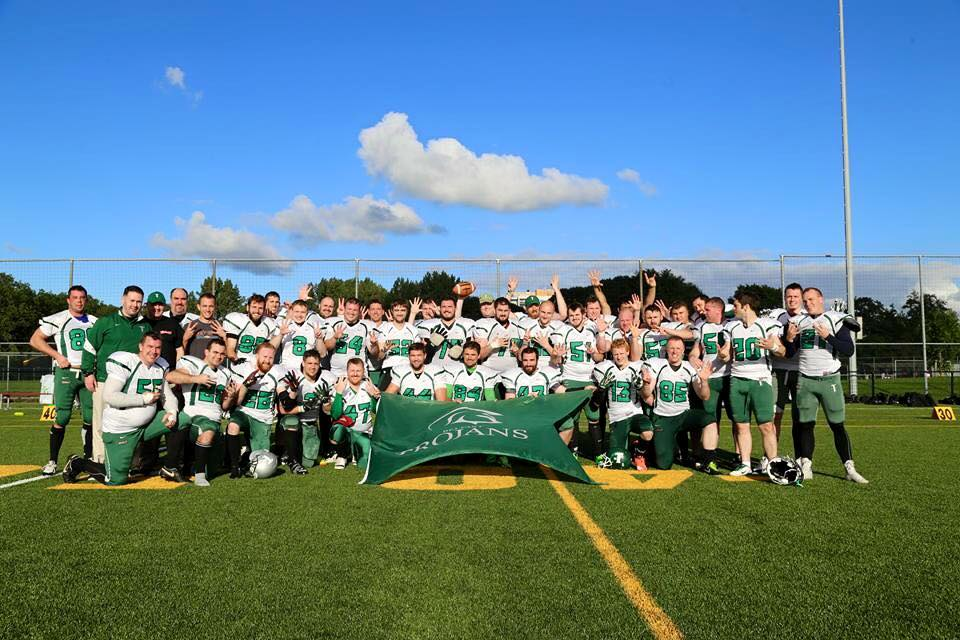
Trojans celebrate winning the 2015 Atlantic Cup in Groningen, Netherlands, marking the first time an IAFL team won European silverware away from the island.

- Shamrock Bowl Champions (6): 2012, 2013, 2014, 2015, 2019, 2025
- Shamrock Bowl Finalists (2): 2016, 2026
- EFAF/GFLI Atlantic Cup Champions (2): 2013, 2015
- IAFL-2 Champions (1): 2015
