= Dublin Rebels =

American football team in Ireland

- Full name: Dublin Rebels American Football Club
- Sport: American football
- Founded: 1995
- League: American Football Ireland
- Division: Premier Division
- Based in: Dublin, Ireland
- Stadium: Kilternan, Kirwan Park, De La Salle Palmerston FC
- Colours: Black, Red
- Championships: 2001, 2003, 2004, 2005, 2006, 2010, 2011, 2016, 2017, 2023
- Website: www.dublinrebels.com

The Dublin Rebels are an American football team based in Dublin, Ireland. As of 2025, the team competes in the Premier Division of American Football Ireland (AFI). They are the most successful team in the top flight of AFI, having won the Shamrock Bowl championship 10 times, as well as winning European silverware on the amateur level. The club registered undefeated seasons in the Irish top flight in 2006, 2010, and 2023.

== History ==
The Dublin Rebels were founded in 1995, initially competing in flag football leagues. After the hiatus of the Irish top flight in 2000, the Rebels became one of the four initial teams of the re-instituted Irish American Football League (IAFL) that began with the 2001 season. They won their first Shamrock Bowl title that season, defeating the Carrickfergus Knights 28–7 in Shamrock Bowl XV.

In the early 2000s, the team won four consecutive Shamrock Bowls from 2003 to 2006. In their 2006 season, the team finished with a perfect 10–0 record across the regular season and postseason. They added further championships in 2010 and 2011, with 2010 again being a "perfect season". This period also saw their first success in wider European competition, taking home the EFAF Charleroi Trophy in 2002 and 2003 in Charleroi, Belgium, with an additional tournament appearance in 2004.

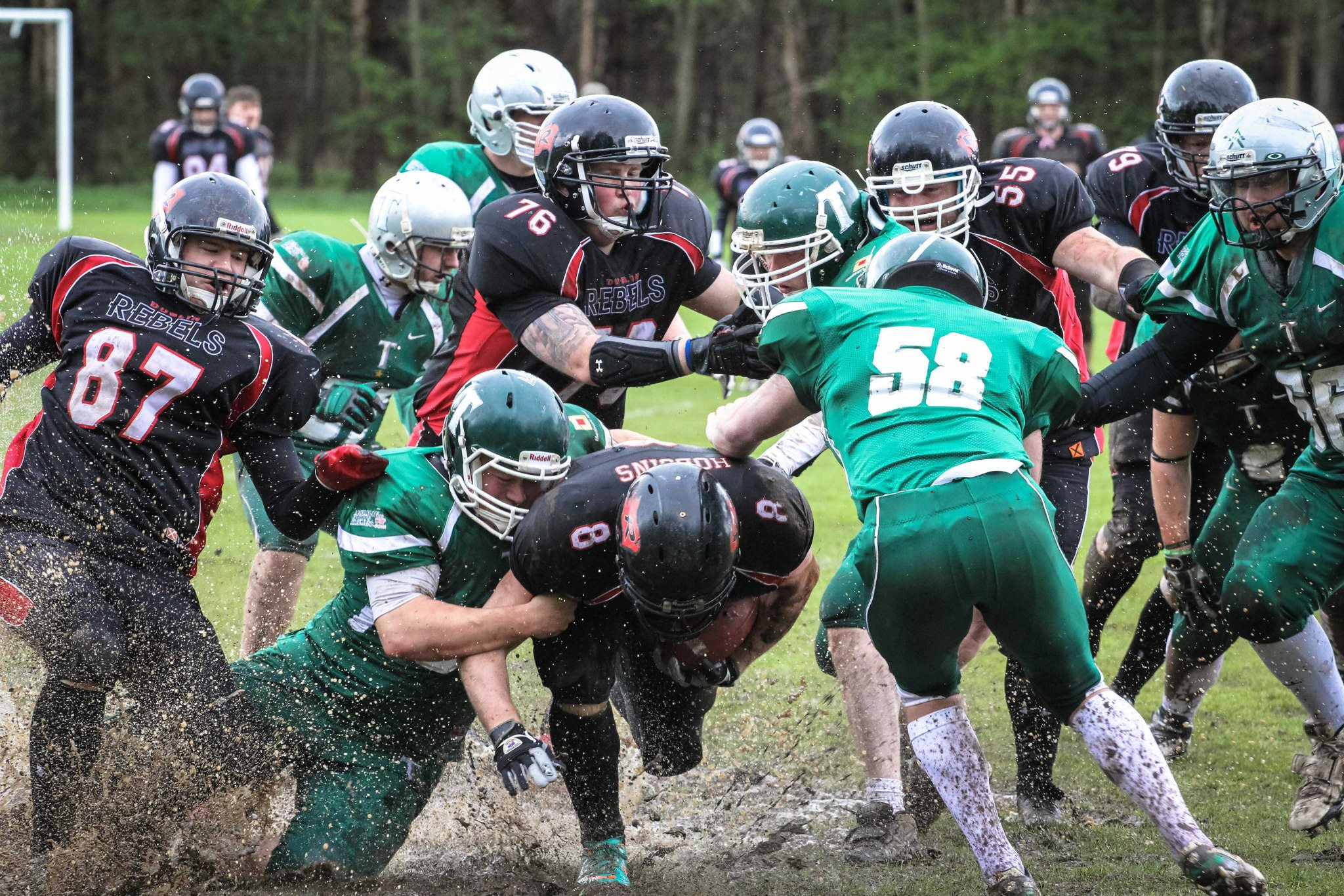
Rebels players competing against the Belfast Trojans in 2013

After a lull in silverware success despite a Shamrock Bowl appearance in 2013, the Rebels won the Shamrock Bowl in 2016 and 2017, the latter a narrow 12–6 win over Carrickfergus. That same year, they won the IFAF Atlantic Cup, defeating Romania's Bucharest Rebels 42–14.

After American Football Ireland returned to play after two cancelled seasons due to the COVID-19 pandemic in 2020–2021, the Rebels appeared in three consecutive Shamrock Bowls from 2022 to 2024 (in each case facing UCD). In the 2023 season, the Rebels completed a third perfect season and secured their 10th title.

== Honours ==
=== Domestic ===
- Shamrock Bowl Champions (10): XV (2001), XVII (2003), XVIII (2004), XIX (2005), XX (2006), XXIV (2010), XXV (2011), XXX (2016), XXXI (2017), XXXV (2023)
- Shamrock Bowl Finalists (6): XXII (2008), XXIII (2009), XXVII (2013), XXXII (2018), XXXIV (2022), XXXVI (2024)

=== International ===
- IFAF Atlantic Cup Champions (1): 2017
- EFAF Charleroi Trophy Champions (2): 2002, 2003
