= Free University =

Free University may refer to:

- Université libre de Bruxelles, Brussels, Belgium
- Vrije Universiteit Brussel, Brussels, Belgium
- Free University of Berlin, Berlin, Germany
- Vrije Universiteit Amsterdam, Amsterdam, Netherlands
- Free University of Bozen-Bolzano, Bolzano, Italy
- Free University of Colombia, Bogota, Colombia
- Copenhagen Free University, Copenhagen, Denmark
- Free International University, Düsseldorf, Germany
- Free University of Ireland, Dublin, Ireland
- Melbourne Free University, Melbourne, Australia
- Midpeninsula Free University, Palo Alto, California, United States (now defunct)
- Open University, Milton Keynes, United Kingdom
- Free University of New York, New York City, New York, United States
- Independent University of Moscow, Moscow, Russia
- Free University of Tbilisi, Tbilisi, Georgia

== See also ==
- Free university
