= Army Equitation School =

Army Equitation School may refer to

- Army School of Equitation, Weedon (1922–1940)
- Irish Army Equitation School (since 1926)
