= Irish Army Equitation School =

Coordinates: 53.3569°N 6.3015°W

Army Equitation School
- Irish: Scoil Eachaíochta an Airm
- Active: 1926–present
- Country: Ireland
- Branch: Army
- Type: Equestrianism
- Part of: Defence Forces
- Garrison/HQ: McKee Barracks, Dublin
- Mottos: Promoting Ireland and the Irish horse.
- Website: www.military.ie/en/who-we-are/army/equitation-school/

Commanders
- Officer Commanding: Lieutenant colonel Tom Freyne

The Equitation School (Irish: An Scoil Eachaíochta) is an installation of the Defence Forces. It is based at McKee Barracks in the Phoenix Park in Dublin.

== Brief history ==
The Army Equitation School was founded in 1926 by Judge William E. Wylie, a prominent member of the Royal Dublin Society, Quartermaster general Colonel Michael Hogan and President of the Executive Council (modern-day Taoiseach) William T. Cosgrave.

Russian riding instructor Colonel Paul Rodzianko, appointed Chief Instructor of the Equitation School (1928 to 1931) by the Minister for Defence, was instrumental in the early competitive successes of the Equitation School. Between 1931 and 1939 the Equitation School went on to win 20 Nations Cups in the cities of Lucerne, Dublin, Boston, Toronto, New York City, Nice, Amsterdam, London, and Aachen.

== Overview ==
Army riders have represented Ireland at the Olympic Games, Show Jumping World Championships and European Show Jumping Championships in the disciplines of show jumping and three-day eventing. The Equitation School has helped the Irish team to numerous victories in the Aga Khan Trophy at the RDS Arena. All Army riders are of officer rank and compete only on Irish-bred sport horses.

The Equitation School, through its involvement with the Racing Academy and Centre of Education (RACE), has trained such jockeys as Johnny Murtagh, Kieren Fallon, Jimmy Quinn and Conor O’Dwyer.

The school also has significant influence on national and supranational equestrian bodies. Both serving and retired Army Equitation School officers sit on committees and boards of Horse Sport Ireland (HSI), International Federation for Equestrian Sports (FEI), Equestrian Federation of Ireland (EFI), Show Jumping Association of Ireland, Eventing Ireland and the RDS Equestrian Committee. The Equitation School has contributed to the development of training and coaching in the Irish and international sport horse industry, with a number of programmes created by the school being adopted by national and international bodies as the standard.

The Equitation School took in over €73,000 in prize money at national and international events in 2012. The budget to run the school for 2012 amounted to €2.26 million. 50% of prize money is shared with the school's riders. 100% of the costs of the school is paid by the Irish taxpayer. The Irish horse sport industry is worth an estimated €800 million to the Irish economy.

=== Current riding officers ===
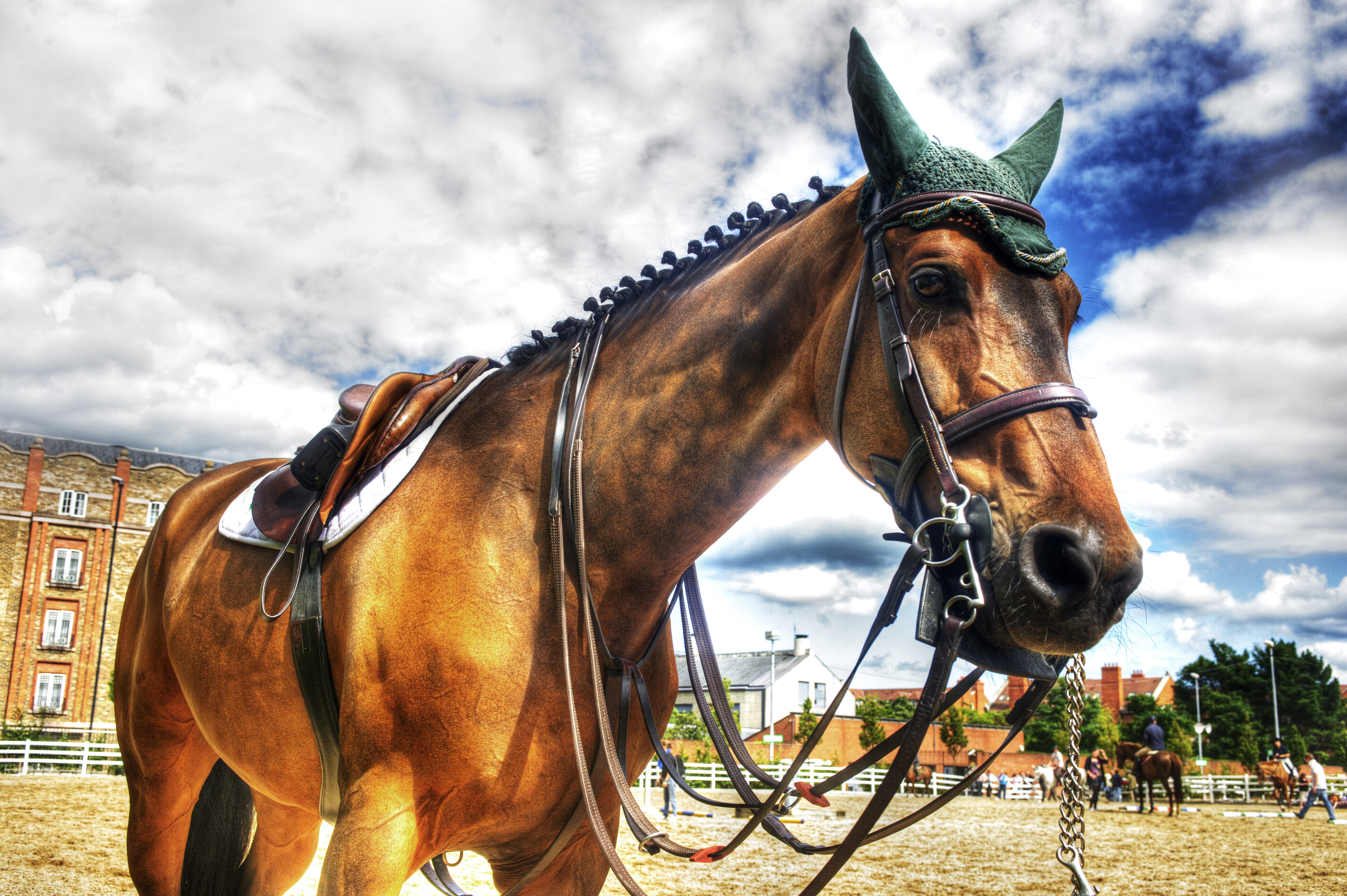
Army horse, Mo Chroí, at the Dublin Horse Show in the RDS in 2011

Rank	Name	Joined Equit Sch
Captain	Geoffrey Curran	2003
Lieutenant	David Power	2010
Second lieutenant	Jennifer Larkin	2015
Lieutenant	Charlene Kehoe	2016
Lieutenant	Adam Benson Byrne	2018

== See also ==
- Aga Khan Trophy
- Army School of Equitation
