= Blackhorse Avenue =

Street in Dublin, Ireland

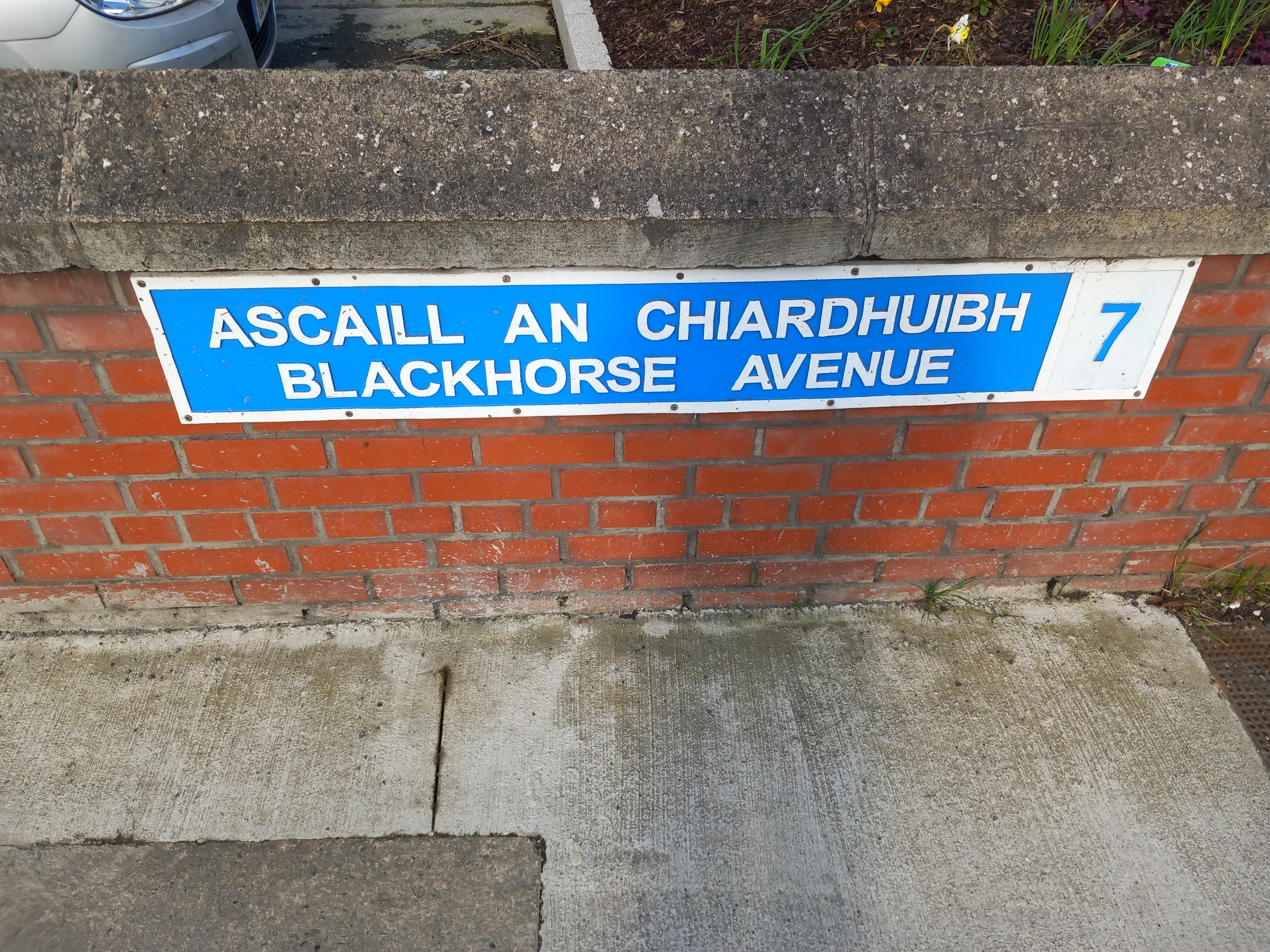
- Blackhorse Avenue bilingual road sign
- Interactive map of Blackhorse Avenue
- Native name: Ascaill an Chiardhuibh (Irish)
- Former name: Blackhorse Lane
- Postal code: D07
- Coordinates: 53.3651°N 6.31963°W
- east end: North Circular Road
- west end: Castleknock Road

Blackhorse Avenue (Irish: Ascaill an Chiardhuibh) is a street on the northside of Dublin, Ireland. The street runs from North Circular Road at the east to Castleknock Road in the west along the northern edge of the Phoenix Park.

== History ==
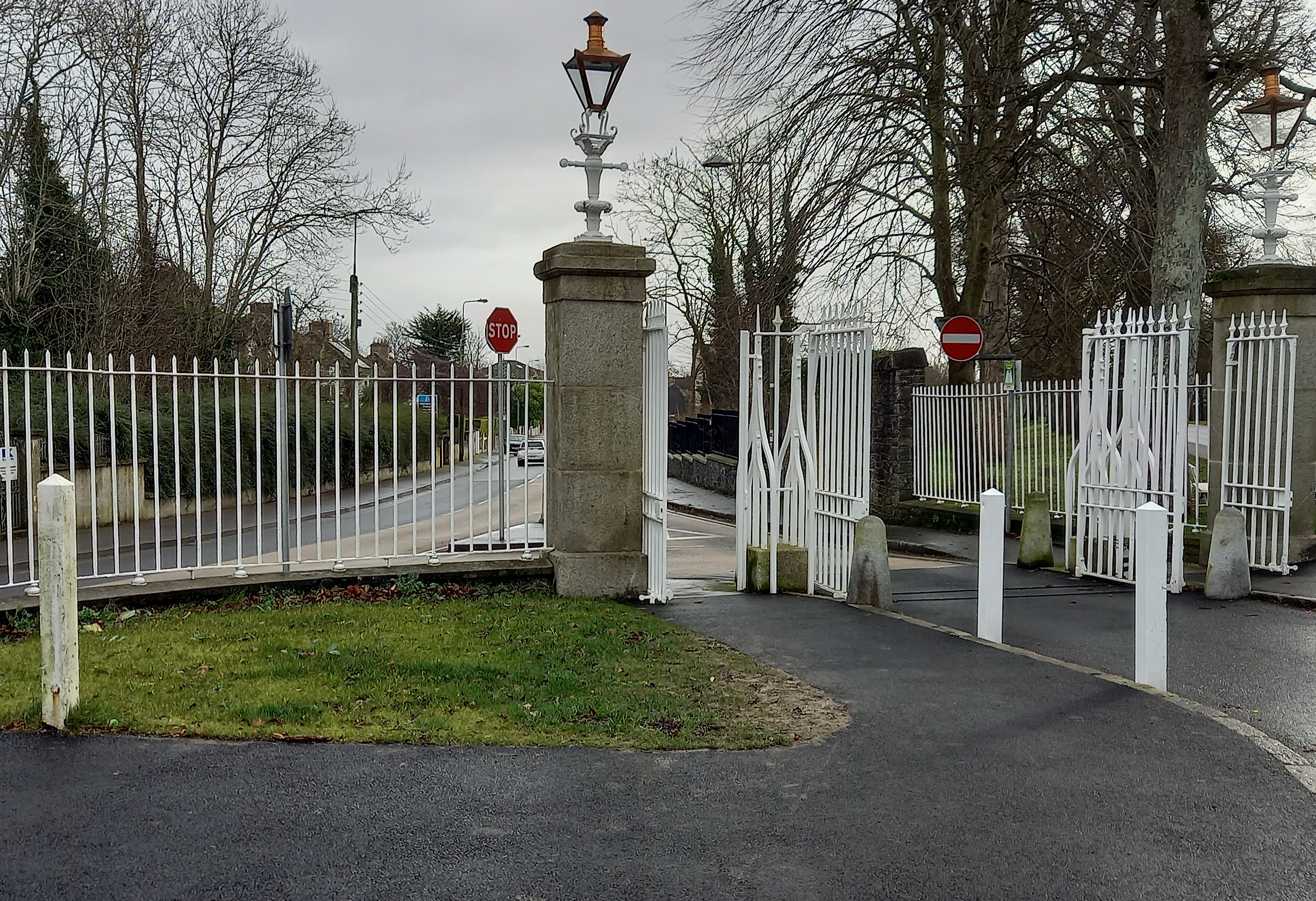
Entrance to the Phoenix Park at Blackhorse Avenue onto the North Road

Blackhorse Avenue was previously known as Blackhorse Lane, and was named for a tavern known as The Black Horse. The tavern was commonly known as Nancy Hand's, after the hostess in the 1800s, but is now known as The Hole in the Wall. The street was known as Blackhorse Lane up to the 1890s, and previously extended past the North Circular Road to the street now known as Aughrim Street.

One of the most prominent landmarks on Blackhorse Avenue is McKee Barracks, which was constructed on the street from 1888 onwards as Marlborough Barracks. There is also an associated military cemetery on the street, the Grangegorman Military Cemetery, and opened in 1876.

From the 1860s, Blackhorse Lane was the site of the abattoir associated with the Dublin Cattle Market nearby on North Circular Road until its closure in 1976.

The Cabra Gate of Phoenix Park opens onto Blackhorse Avenue. Some houses on the street are so close to Dublin Zoo, that animals including the monkeys and lions can be heard by the residents.

=== The Hole in the Wall pub ===
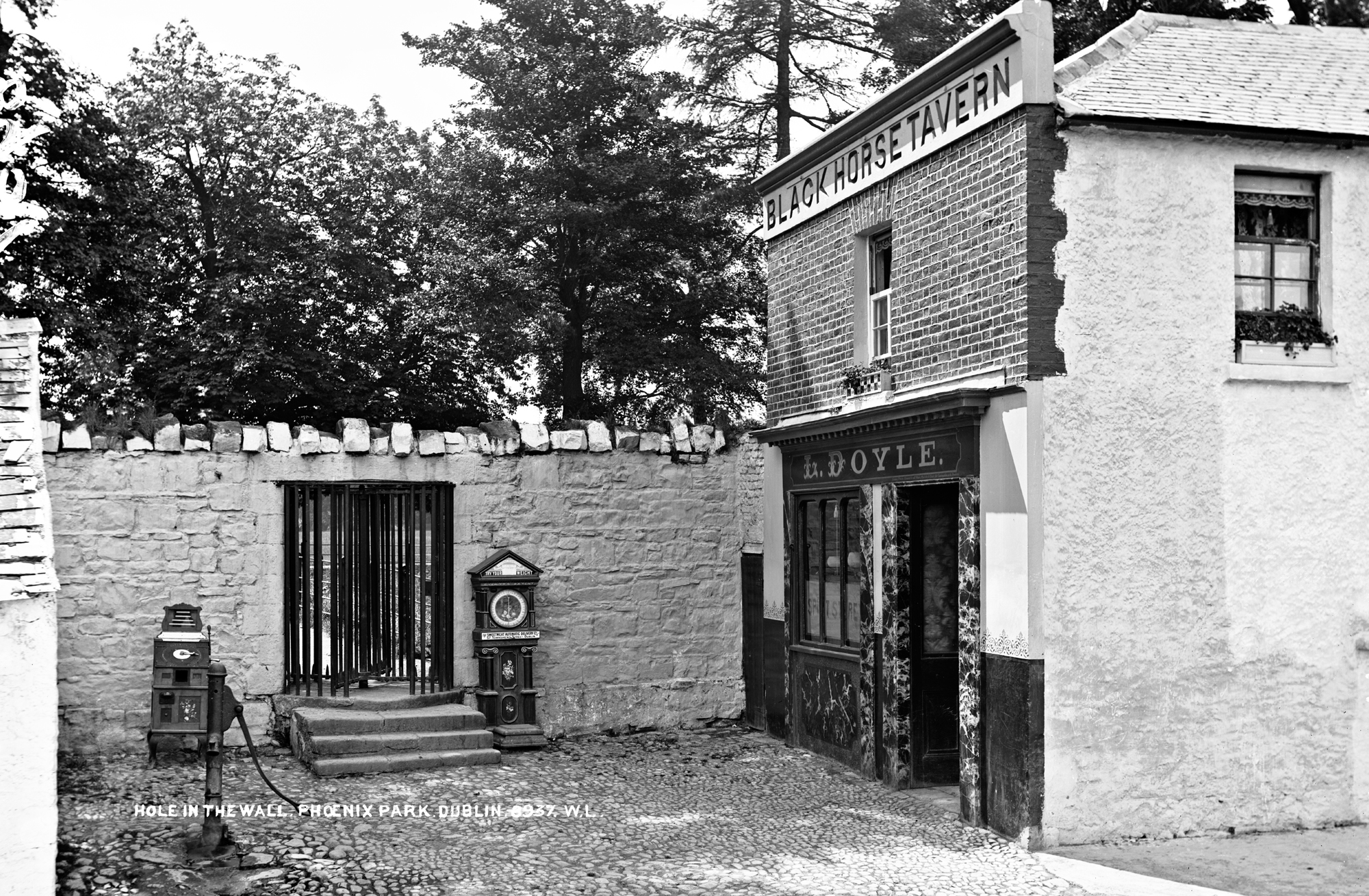
The Blackhorse Tavern, now The Hole in the Wall, circa 1865-1914

The pub was established in 1861, and a plaque inside the entrance stated: "one of the oldest public houses in Ireland, which for centuries has offered hospitality to all who cared to enter its doors." The pub's current name is due to the proximity of the pub to a pedestrian entrance into the Phoenix Park. Though other sources claim that the name was due to soldiers from the neighbouring barracks would be served surreptitiously through a hatch or hole in the wall and thus did not breach the military regulation of entering a licensed premises while on duty.

The pub claims to be Europe's longest pub, at 330 feet long. The interior is a series of six bars and a mezzanine upstairs.

=== Notable residents ===
- Frank MacDonald, journalist, grew up on Glenmore Road, between Blackhorse Avenue and the Old Cabra Road.
