= Aughrim Street =

Street in Dublin, Ireland

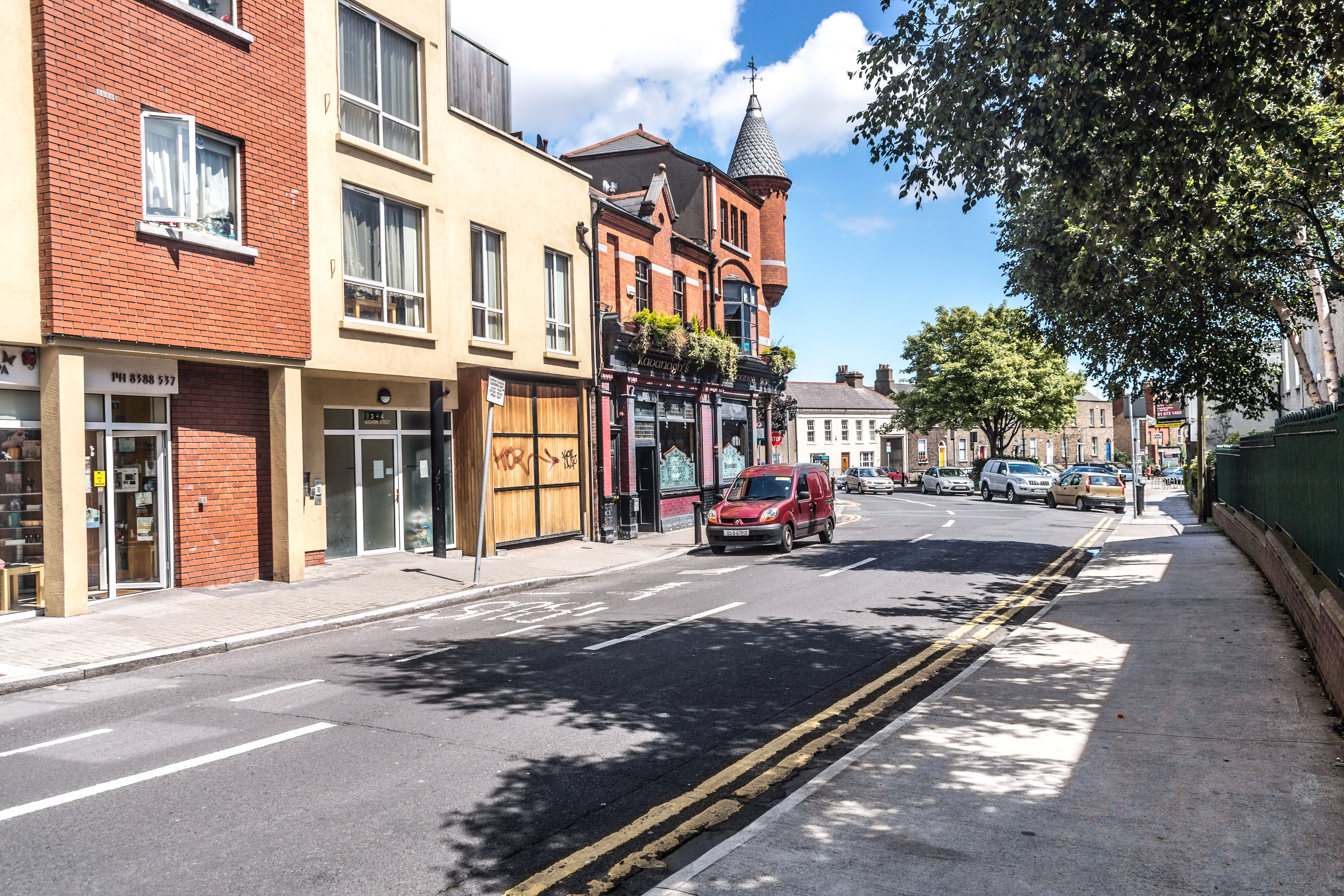
- Aughrim Street looking south to Manor Street
- Interactive map of Aughrim Street
- Native name: Sráid Eachroma (Irish)
- Former name: Blackhorse Lane
- Postal code: D07
- Coordinates: 53.3534°N 6.28669°W
- north end: North Circular Road
- south end: Manor Street and Prussia Street

Aughrim Street (Irish: Sráid Eachroma) is a street on the northside of Dublin, Ireland. The street runs from North Circular Road at the north to Manor Street and Prussia Street in the south.

== History ==
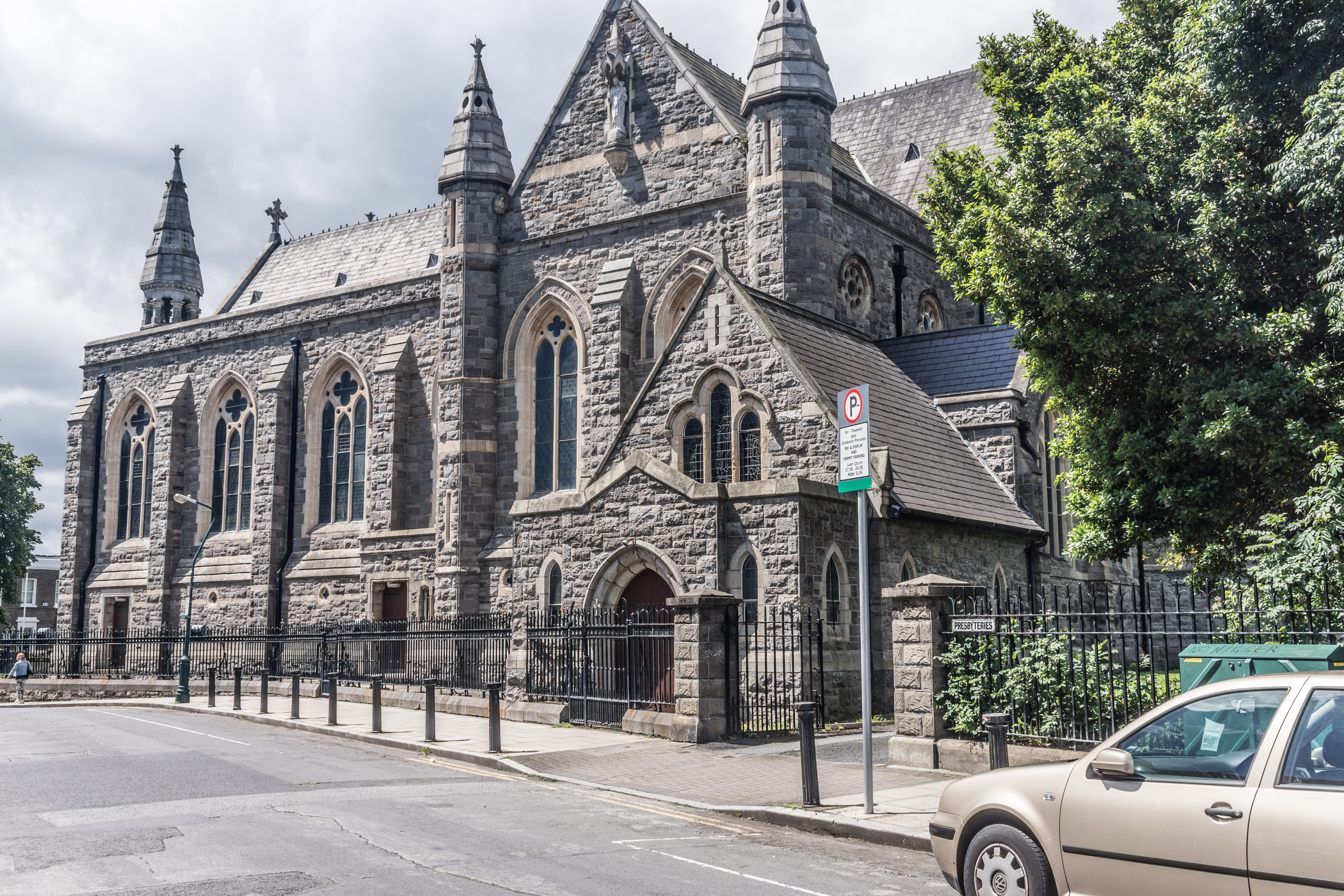
Church of the Holy Family, Aughrim Street

Aughrim Street was renamed in late 1700s to mark the centenary of the Battle of Aughrim, which took place in County Galway in 1691. The street was previously an extension of Blackhorse Lane (now Blackhorse Avenue) which runs from the North Circular Road northwards.

From 1863, the area between Aughrim Street and Prussia Street along the North Circular Road was the Dublin Cattle Market until the early 1970s.

The 1876 Church of the Holy Family sits on the eastern side of Aughrim Street, on the corner of St Joseph's Road, and was designed by John Stirling Butler. It was extended in 1902 to accommodate the extra residents living locally in the newly constructed houses by the Dublin Artisan Dwelling Company. It features sculpture by Patrick Tomlin and carvings by John B. Earley. The Dublin Artisan Dwelling Company houses on Aughrim Street were completed in 1897.

At numbers 1-2 Aughrim Street, on the corner with Manor Street is Kavanagh's pub, a Victorian pub with a distinctive circular turret on the corner. It was designed by George L. O'Connor and was built in 1901, and replaced numbers 48 and 49 Manor Street.
