= Manor Street =

Street in Dublin, Ireland

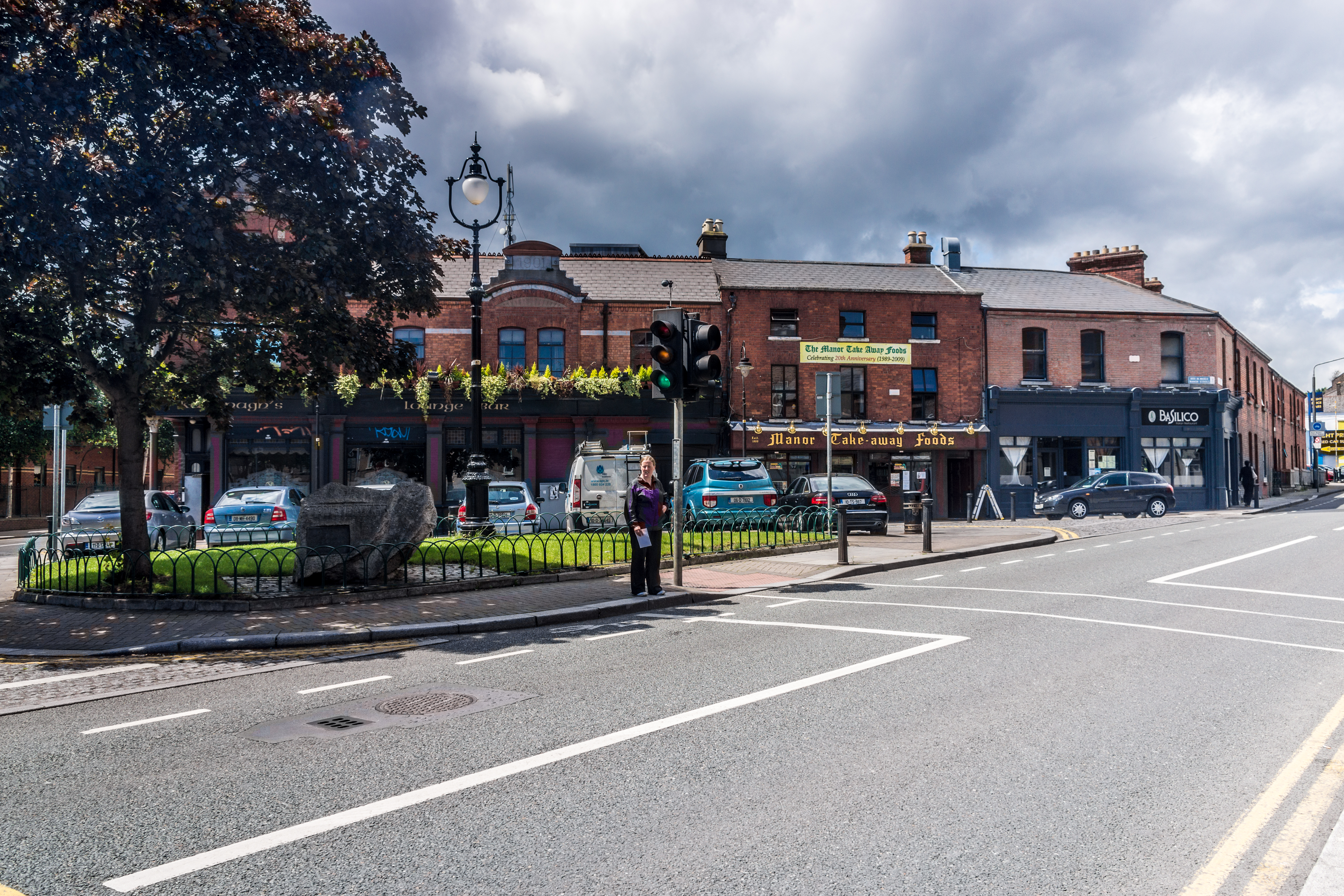
- Manor Street looking towards Prussia Street
- Interactive map of Manor Street
- Native name: Sráid an Mhainéir (Irish)
- Postal code: D07
- Coordinates: 53.3509°N 6.28252°W
- north end: Prussia Street and Aughrim Street
- South end: Stoneybatter

Manor Street (Irish: Sráid an Mhainéir) is a street on the northside of Dublin, Ireland. The street runs from Aughrim Street and Prussia Street at the north to Stoneybatter in the south.

== History ==
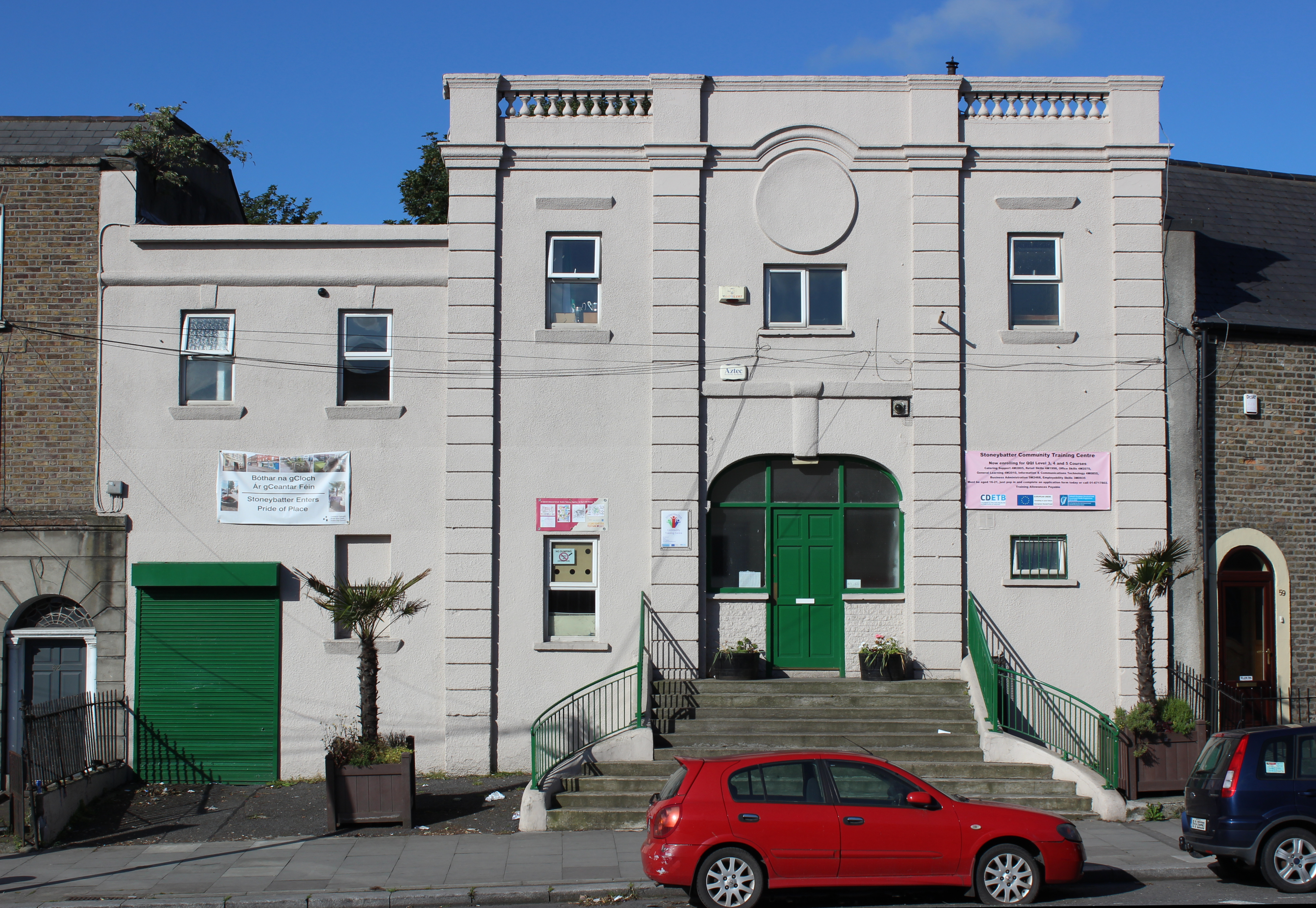
Former Manor Street Picture House

Manor Street was part of Stoneybatter (Bóthar na gCloch) until 1781, taking its name from the Manor of Glasnevin and Gorman. Along with Infirmary Road, North Circular Road, Aughrim Street, Prussia Street, and Grangegorman, Manor Street is one of the oldest streets in the area. Oxmanstown Stream ran the route of Manor Street, but is now sub-terrain, visible where it discharges into the Liffey. Maps from 1837-1841 show Manor Street surrounded by farmland.

The architecture of Manor Street is predominately 19th century two-storey houses. In the 1870s, number 42, Grangegorman Manor, served as Police Station D Division, Dublin Metropolitan Police. The Manor later served as a Garda Station from 1926 until the 1940s, later becoming Gateway Project education centre.

Number 60/61 was the Manor Street Picture House, later known as Palladium, and then from 1934 as Broadway. A number of tenements were demolished and the cinema built in the 1910s. Opening in 1914, this single screen cinema sat 630, and was one of the few purpose-built cinemas of the time. The cinema closed on 11 August 1956, probably due to its proximity to cinemas in the city centre. It was then occupied by the Dublin Cooperage Company, before it was converted to become a FÁS community training unit in 1988. The facade is a rare surviving example of a purpose-built early cinema.

=== Notable residents ===
- Joseph Cashman, photographer, lived at number 13.
- Austin Clarke, poet, was born in number 83, and commemorated the street in his poem Mnemosyne Lay in Dust:

Past the house where he was got

In darkness, terrace, provision shop

Wing-hidden convent opposite.

- Mary Mulvihill, science communicator and journalist, lived on the street and a plaque now marks her home.
