= Prussia Street =

Street in northwest Dublin, Ireland

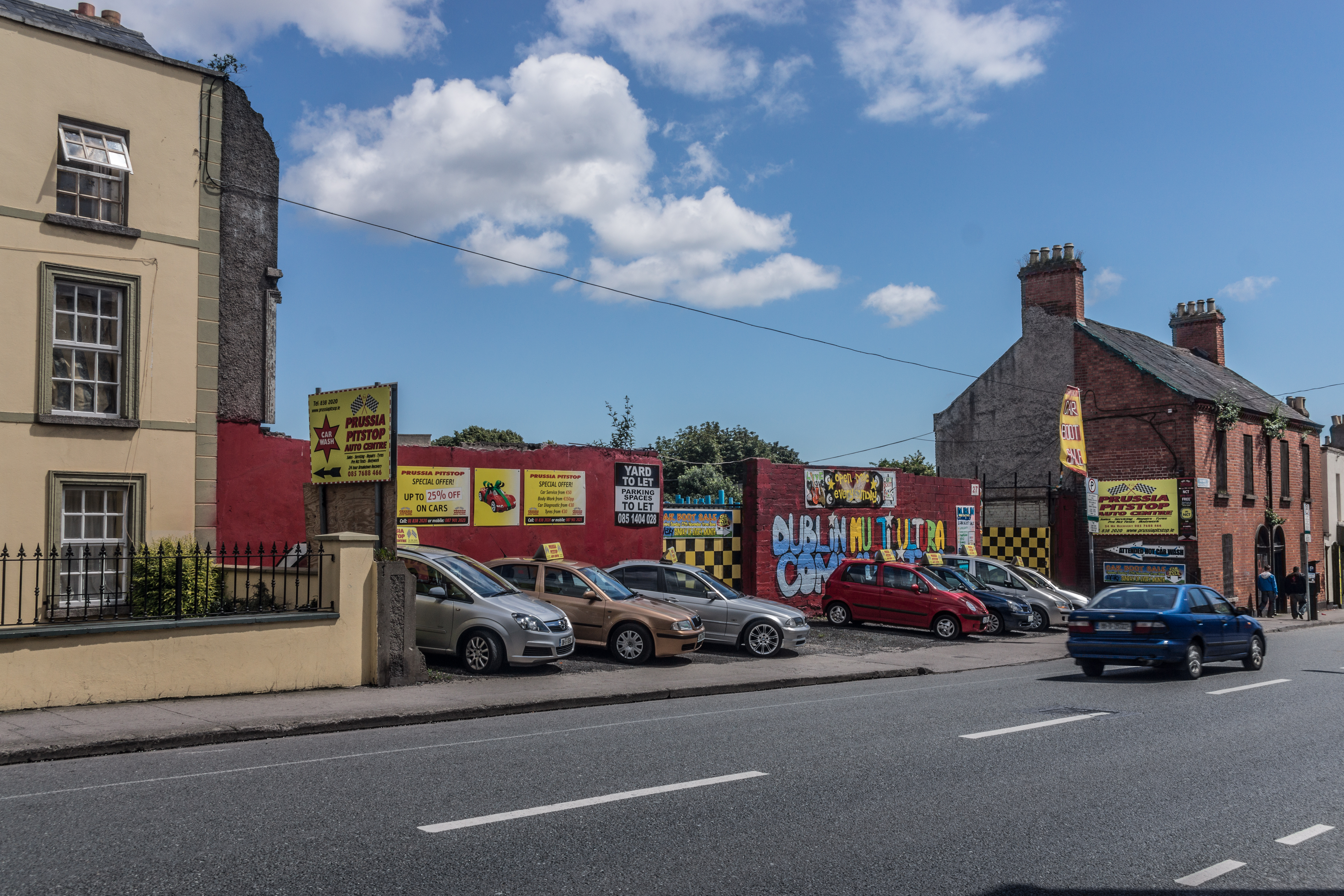

- Location within Central Dublin Location within Dublin
- Native name: Sráid na Prúise (Irish)
- Former name: Cabra(gh) Lane (until 1760)
- Part of: Stoneybatter
- Namesake: Kingdom of Prussia
- Length: 500 m (1,600 ft)
- Width: 12 metres (39 ft)
- Location: Dublin, Ireland
- Postal code: D07
- Coordinates: 53°21′19″N 6°17′15″W
- Northwest end: Old Cabra Road, North Circular Road
- Southeast end: Manor Street

Construction
- Completion: 1750s–60s

Other
- Known for: Free University of Ireland, cattle market

Prussia Street (Irish: Sráid na Prúise) is a street in northwest Dublin, Ireland. It runs straight northwest–southeast from Old Cabra(gh) Road to Manor Street in Stoneybatter.

== History ==
Prussia Street was part of an ancient road that led into Dublin from County Meath; Rathbornes Candles was located here in the 17th century. Originally named Cabra(gh) Lane, the western part was built up by the 1750s and the east by 1760. In the 1760s it was renamed in honour of the Kingdom of Prussia, with whom Britain was allied in opposition to France in the Seven Years' War. A metal bust of Frederick the Great by Patrick Cunningham, apprentice to John van Nost the younger, was added at this time to a niche over a premises on the street.

A number of early Georgian buildings still remain intact on the street, including numbers 14, 29, 67 and 55.

Dublin's cattle market was located between the North Circular Road, bounded by Prussia Street, Aughrim Street and St. Joseph's Road. It was constructed in 1863 by Dublin city engineer, Park Neville. By the 1950s, it was the largest weekly livestock sale in Europe before becoming obsolete and finally closing in 1973. The market was a direct continuation of the livestock market that had taken place in nearby Smithfield for several centuries.

In 1970, it was the scene of a supposed event of spontaneous human combustion, when Margaret Hogan's burned body was found at her house at Number 89.

The Free University of Ireland was founded at 55 Prussia Street in 1986.

== Gallery ==
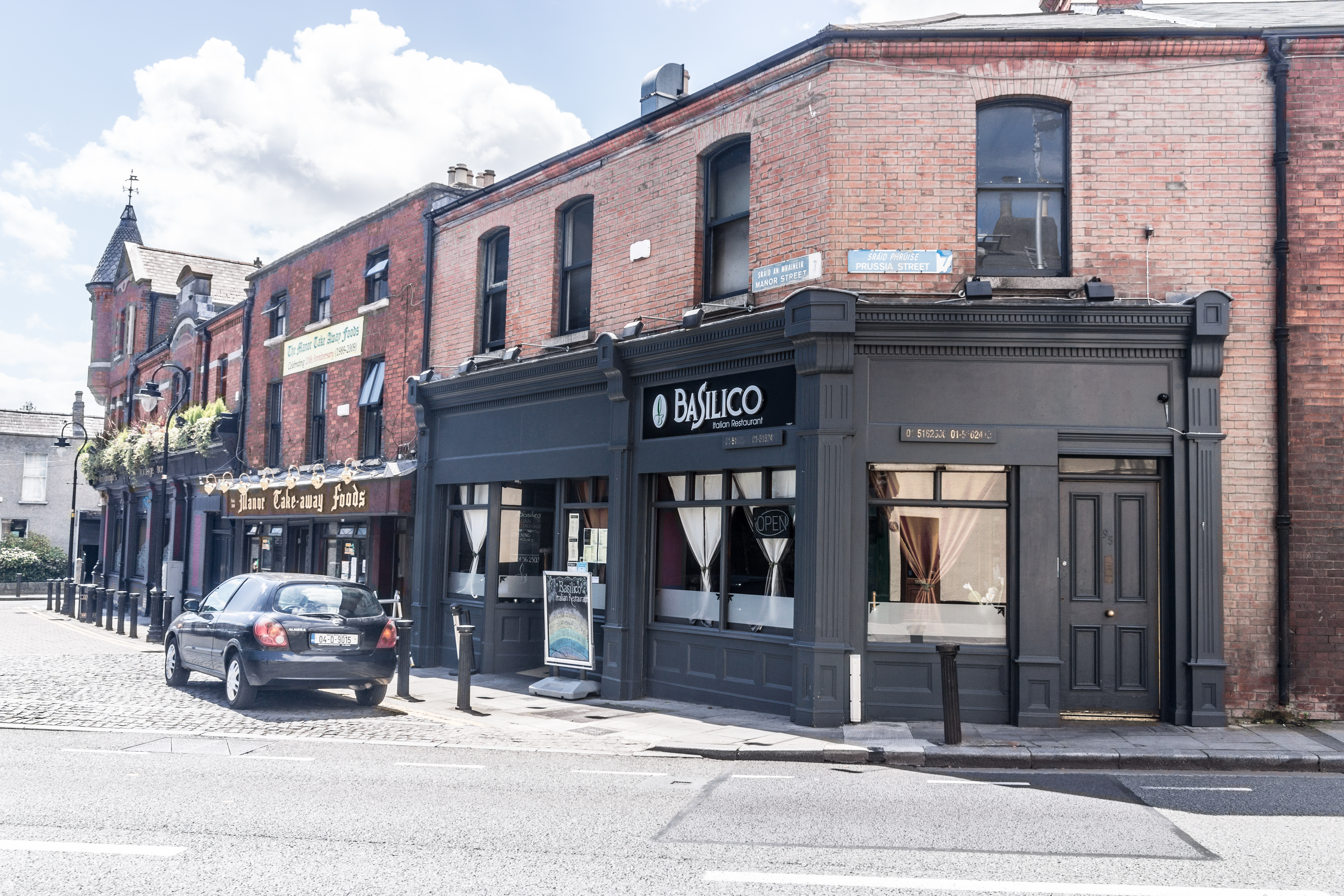
Junction with Manor Street

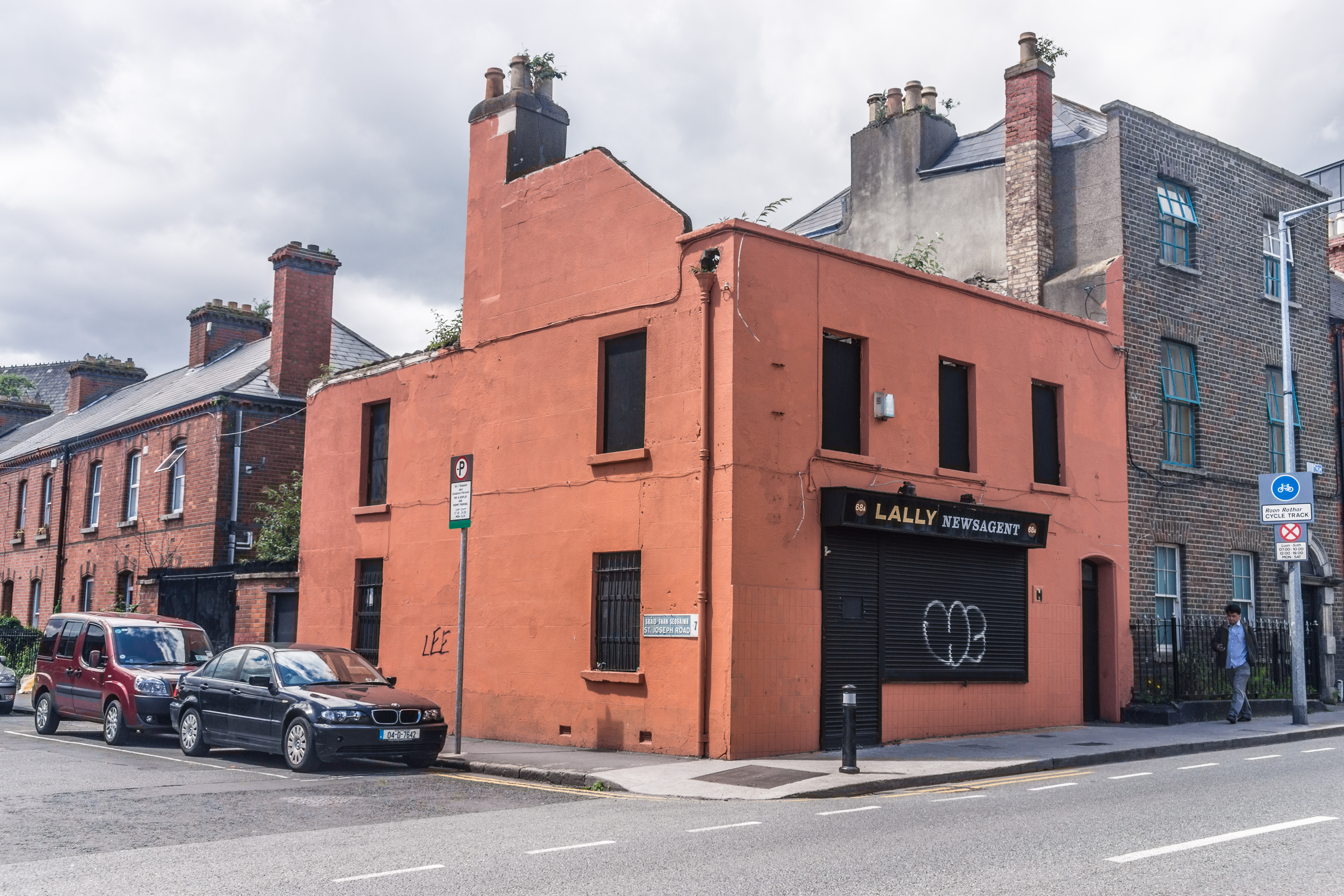
Junction with St. Joseph Road

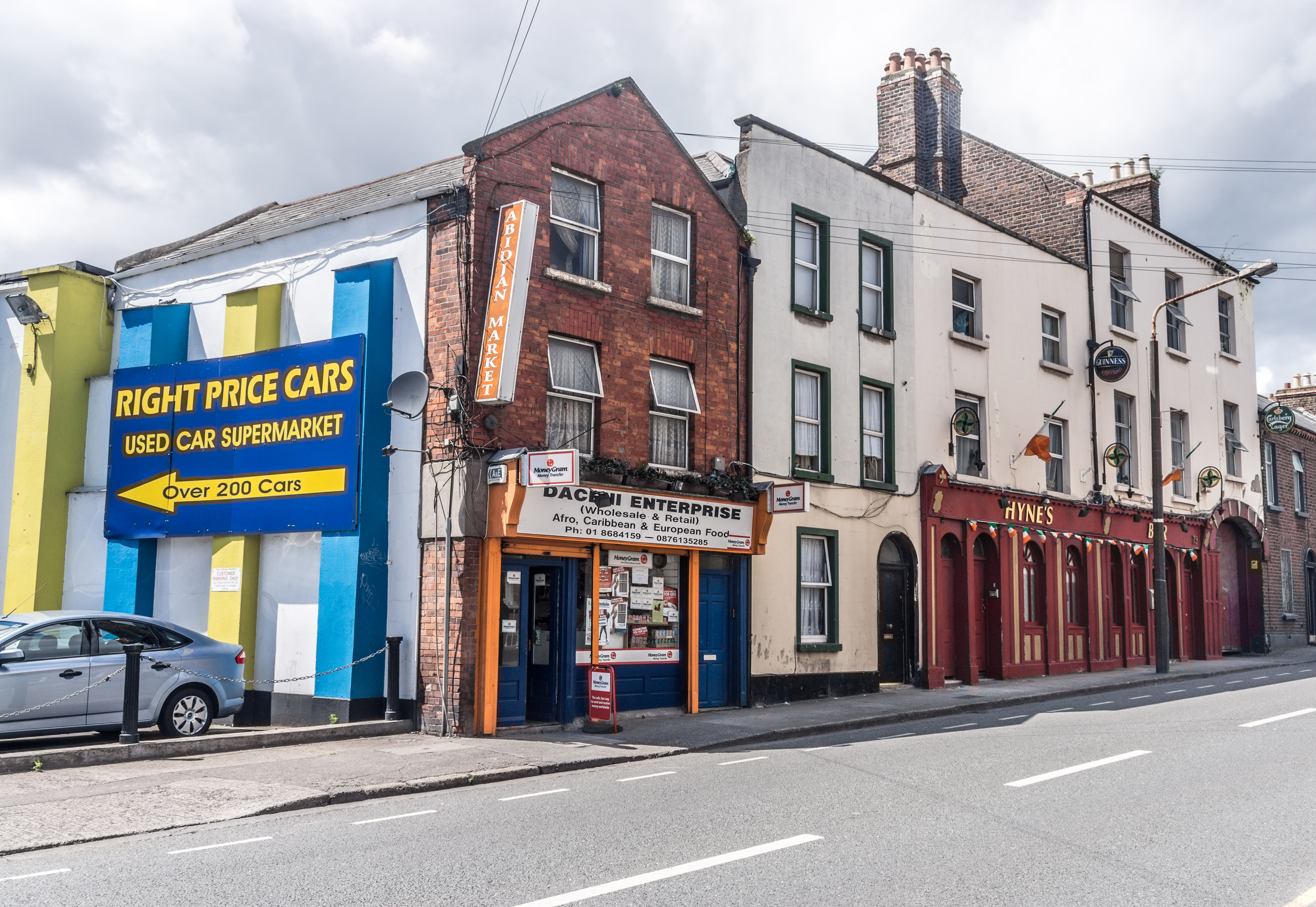
View of street

== See also ==
- List of streets and squares in Dublin
