= McKee Barracks =

Military installation in Dublin, Ireland

- Dún Mhic Aoidh
- Dublin, Ireland
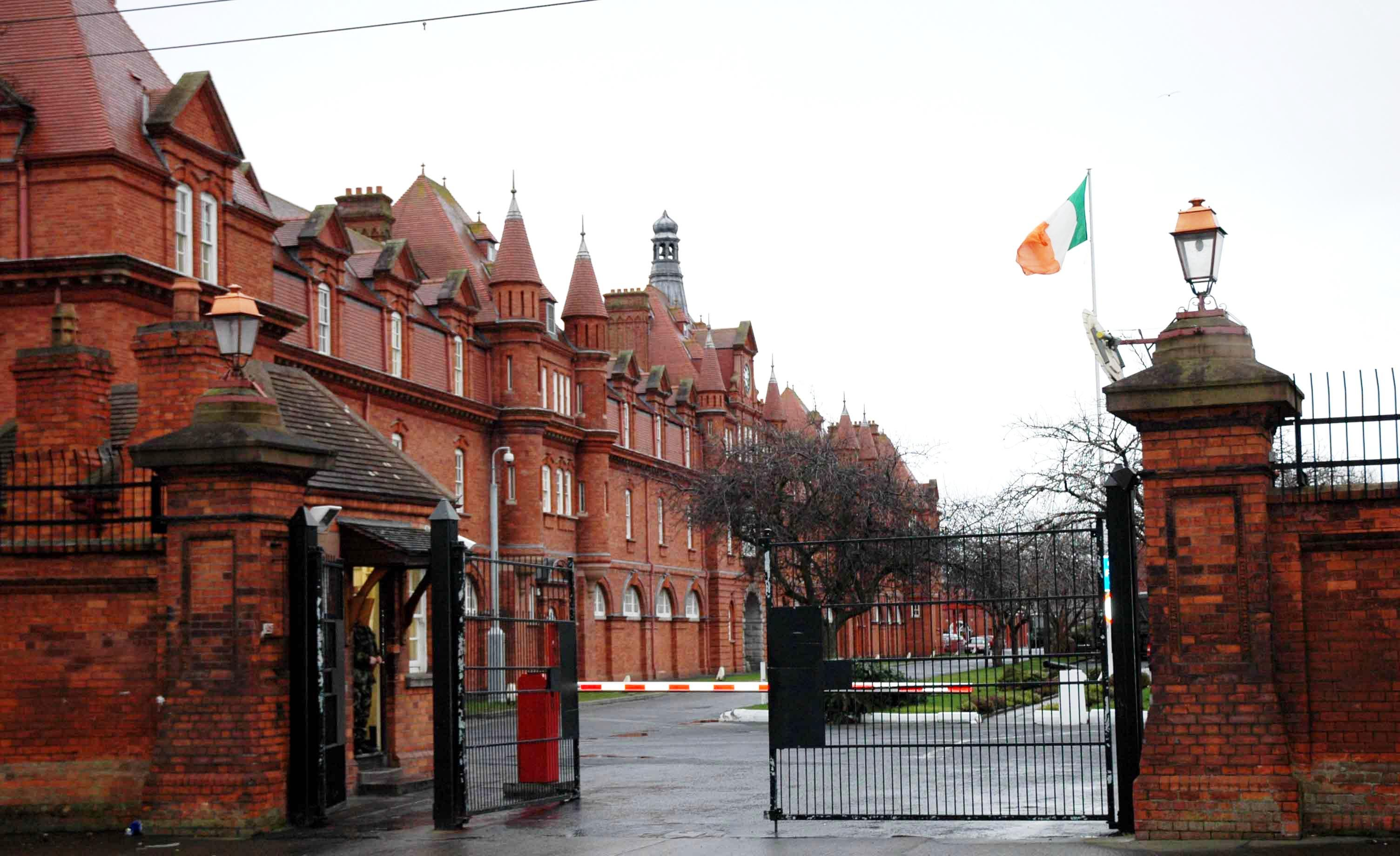
- Main entrance to McKee Barracks

Site information
- Type: Barracks
- Operator: (Republic of Ireland) Irish Army

Location
- Location within Dublin
- Coordinates: 53.35614°N 6.29961°W

Site history
- Built: 1888
- Built for: War Office
- In use: 1888-Present

McKee Barracks (Irish: Dún Mhic Aoidh) is a military installation situated on Blackhorse Avenue near Phoenix Park in Cabra, Dublin, Ireland.

== History ==
Known first as Grangegorman Barracks, taking its name from the historical civil parish in which it was situated, (Note: Today this is considered as being within the West Cabra area. At the time of building, the lands on either side of Blackhorse Lane/Avenue were considered to be within Grangegorman parish, including Grangegorman Military Cemetery which is adjacent to McKee Barracks.) this was the last permanent barracks built in Dublin and was erected between 1888 and 1892. The choice of site was made on account of its proximity to the railway (by which troops could be transported anywhere in Ireland), excellent access to the sea / Dublin Port via the North Circular Road, and the training facilities for men and war horses.

The barracks was later named Marlborough Barracks after John Churchill, 1st Duke of Marlborough. While the facility was considered small compared to other cavalry barracks, it was said to be of ample size for a cavalry regiment of full war strength of 862 men (all ranks) and stabling for as many horses. On 15 October 1891 the headquarters of the 10th Hussars was moved there under Major Manners-Wood (commanding). It was from Marlborough Barracks that the 6th Reserve Cavalry Regiment, made up of squadrons of the 5th Lancers and 12th Lancers, rode down what is now O'Connell Street in Easter 1916 and came under fire from the GPO, and beat a hasty retreat after encountering the Irish Volunteers and Irish Citizen Army who had taken over the building.

Following the Anglo-Irish Treaty, the barracks was handed over to the Army of the Irish Free State on 17 December 1922 and renamed McKee Barracks (after Brigadier Dick McKee, a prominent IRA officer and Officer in Command (O/C) of the Dublin Brigade) at some stage between 1926 and 1930.

McKee Barracks is now an administrative centre where various Directors of Corps are based, as well as the location of the Irish Army Equitation School. In 2016, the barracks were used to depict the main entrance to Broadmoor Asylum for the film The Professor and the Madman, while an area of the Equitation School doubled as the Oxford railway station.

In 2020, as part of the national response to the COVID-19 pandemic, a Defence Forces joint task force was established in McKee Barracks. The joint task force was involved in co-ordinating the Defence Forces supports during the response to COVID-19, with the priority on supports to the HSE.

== Architecture ==
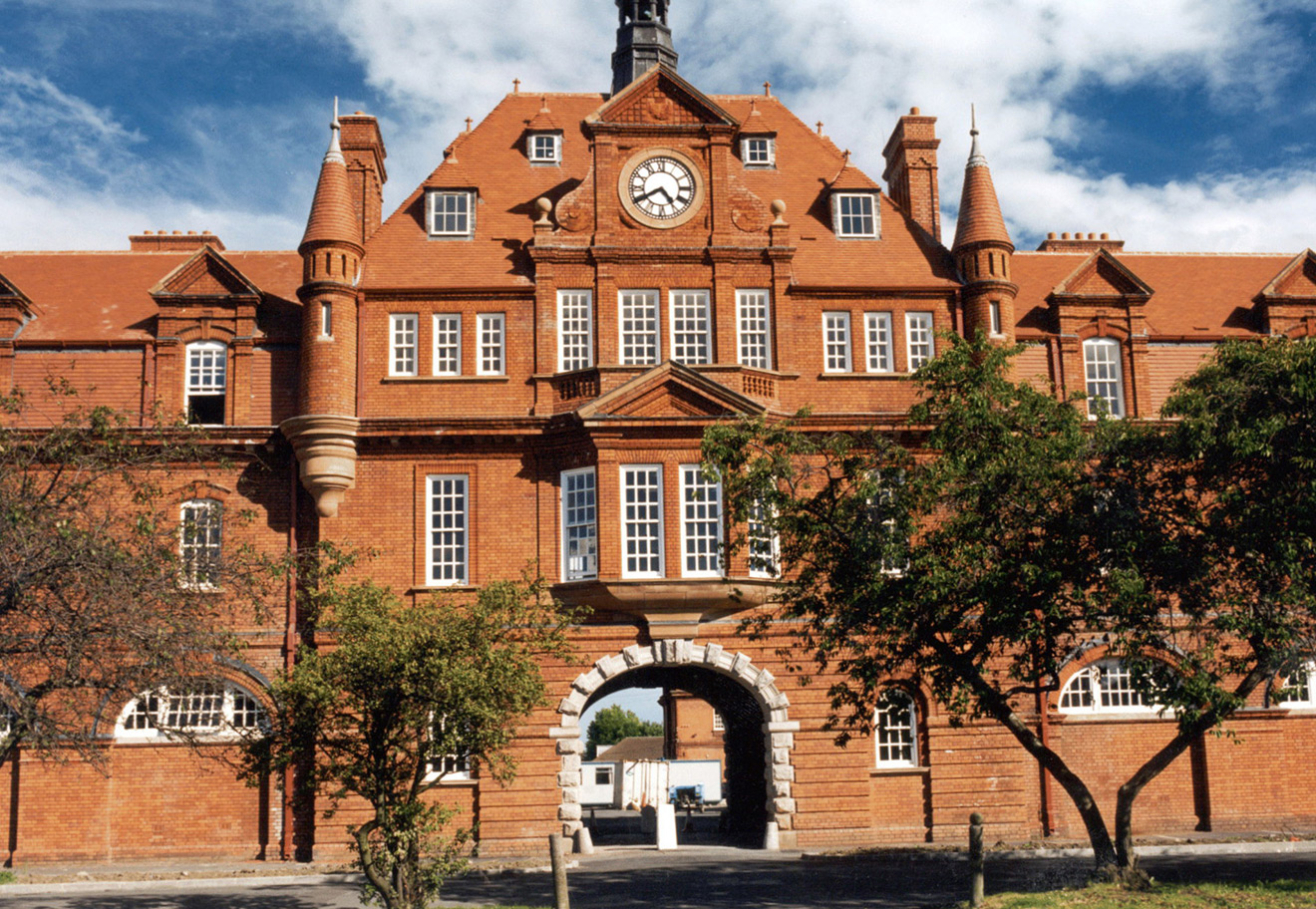
McKee Barracks facade

The plans were prepared by the Royal Engineers' Department, under the direction of architect Major Robert Barklie RE, Larne, County Antrim. The style of the officers' mess is a mixture of Elizabethan and Queen Anne styles, and the general appearance of its red brick and red roof tiles, with "traceried windows, floriated pinnacles, parapets and panelled battlements", (quoting Lt. Col. MacNeill's description in his Cosantoir account of the building of the barracks), are described as being in a "broad Romantic style", but not in any specific national style or idiom. (Note: O'Donnell suggests that elements like the pepper-box turrets and cupolas may even be seen in Russian and Turkish design of the time.) The men's billets are in a "robust Tudor style".

== See also ==
- List of Irish military installations
