= Free University of Ireland =

University in Dublin, Ireland

Coordinates: 53°21′22″N 6°17′25″W

- Saor-Ollscoil na hÉireann
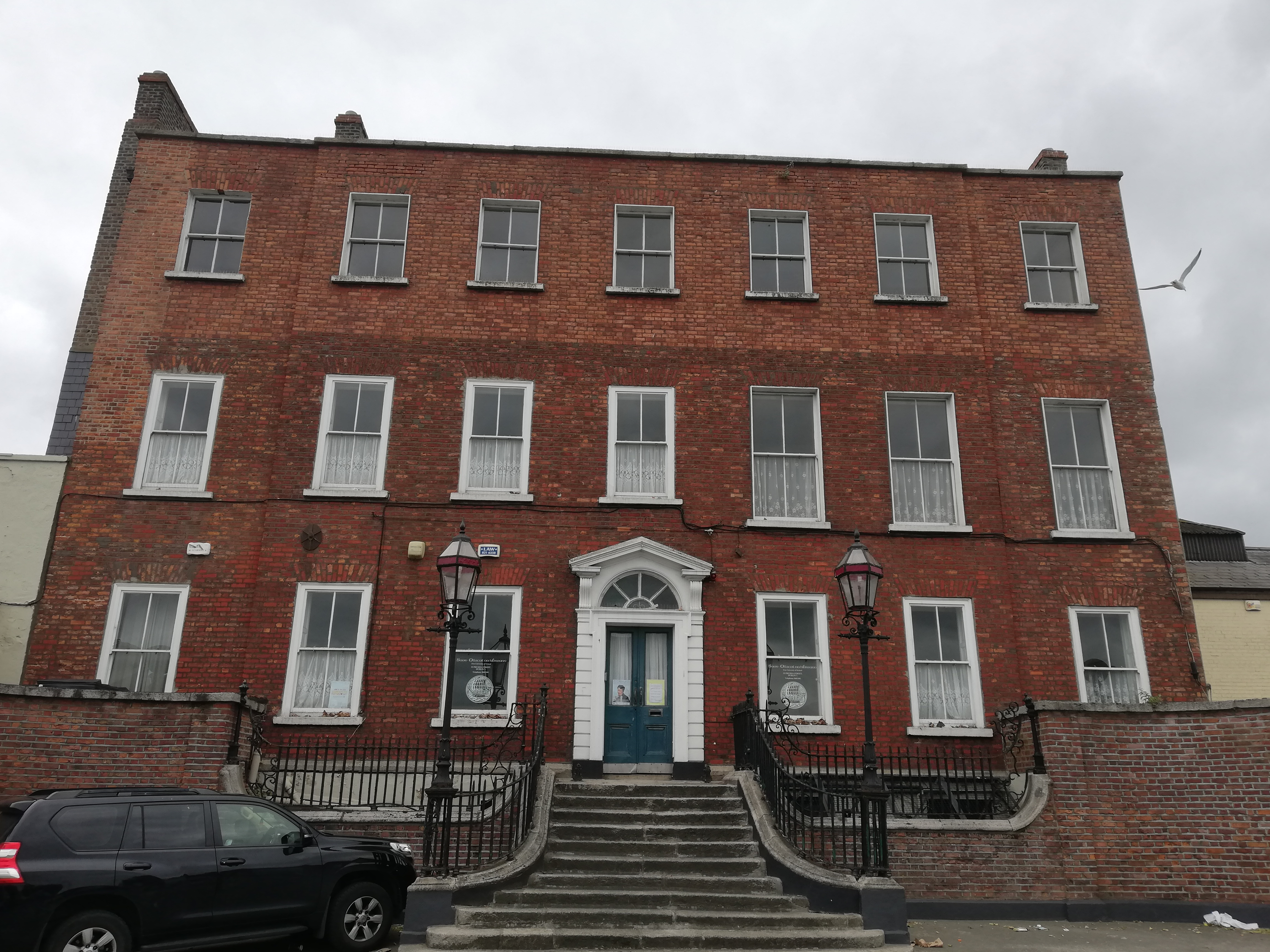
- Motto: Beholden to None
- Type: Independent; Not for Profit.
- Established: 1986
- Chancellor: Dr. Mairéad Ní Chíosóig
- Registrar: Dr. Mairéad Ní Chíosóig
- Location: 55 Prussia Street, Dublin, Dublin 7, Ireland
- Website: http://www.saor-ollscoil.ie/

Free University of Ireland (Saor-Ollscoil na hÉireann) is an independent university in Prussia Street, Dublin, Ireland established in 1986 by a small group of educationalists including Daragh Smyth, Paul John Cannon, Kevin O'Byrne, Padraig O'Fiannachta, and Mairéad Ní Chíosóig. The university is a free and independent institute not in receipt of state funding. It is run by a board of governors, is a charitable trust, and has research college status. Lecturers and administrators are not paid; students are charged only a fee to cover administrative expenses.

The University provides tertiary education to degree standard in the humanities and social sciences for mature students. The building was the City Arms Hotel, frequented by James Joyce and mentioned several times in his novel Ulysses.

== BA in Liberal Arts ==
Subjects available for the BA in Liberal Arts include Psychoanalysis, Philosophy, Gaeilge(Irish), American Studies, Classical Studies, Irish History, EU Law, European Literature, European History, Media, Psychology, and Heritage studies.

=== Credit System ===
Credits are awarded for course work on each subject taken and completion of a major thesis, 50 credits go for the course work and 50 for the thesis. Students normally take three subjects each year, with 5 credits available for each subject, with 10 subjects covered over a degree course. Credits are also awarded for work presented, participation in seminars, field trips and summer schools.

== Graduate school ==
Saor-Ollscoil offers further study options, such as MA and PhD by research.

== Graduation ==
Saor Ollscoil hosts a conferring ceremony for graduates each year, usually in the Mansion House, Dublin.

== Annual Summer School ==
In the third week of May each year the university hosts a themed summer school open also to non-students of the university. Examples include:

- 2014 - Seamus Heaney and Patrick Kavanagh - the life and work of two great Irish Poets
- 2013 - James Joyce
- 2012 - 1916, A Terrible Beauty or A Terrible Stupidity?
- 2010 - Seán O'Casey his Life and Works
- 2002 - Dublin Literary and Historical
- 2001 - Beyond the Screen: A Study of Film through the Genres
- 1999 - A festival of Folklore, Dance and Story (held in the National Museum Collins Barracks, Dublin)
- 1992 - Samuel Beckett Summer School (held in St. Stephens School, Northumberland Road Dublin)
- 1991 - Sean O'Casey Summer School

== People associated with Saor-Ollscoil na hÉireann ==
In 2012 the Chancellor Kevin (O')Byrne, a founder of Saor-Ollscoil and former Alderman and Dublin City councillor, died, and his wife Mairéad Ní Chíosóig replaced him as Chancellor. The board of governors of the university includes the historian Margaret MacCurtain, O.P., the former director of the National Museum of Ireland Patrick Wallace, and Brendan Duddy, S.J.
