= Copenhagen Free University =

Artist-run communist collective in Copenhagen, Denmark

Copenhagen Free University (CFU, Danish: Det Fri Universitet i København) is an artist-run communist collective established in May 2001 in Copenhagen, Denmark, although it is not an accredited institution of higher learning. It considers itself as part of the international Situationist movement in collaboration with other like-minded organizations.

The CFU committee comprises artists Henrietta Heise and Jakob Jakobsen, its founders.

The CFU has a guide called The ABZ of the Copenhagen Free University with entries ranging from "self-institution" through "uneconomical behaviour" to "mass intellectuality". It publishes small books and brochures, as well as hosting discussions, conferences, and screenings. One of its publications is a research paper called The Rise and Fall of the Situationists, documenting the influence of the Situationist International in Denmark.

The CFU also helps to run an artist-run television service named TV-TV, broadcast from a squat in Copenhagen (named Folkets Hus — People's House) three nights per week in airtime slots that used to be occupied by TV STop, using TV Stop's equipment. TV-TV's content is usually experimental, and its stated aim is to not be like mainstream television.
