= Earley and Company =

Irish furniture and stained glass company

- Industry: Ecclesiastical furnishings and stained glass manufacturing
- Founded: 1861
- Defunct: 1975
- Headquarters: Camden Street, Dublin, Ireland

Earley and Company (1861–1975) were ecclesiastical furnishings and stained glass manufacturers and retailers, based in Camden Street, Dublin, Ireland. In the 19th century they also had an outlet at 51 Lower Clanbrassil Street. The firm was one of the largest and most prestigious ecclesiastical decorators both in Ireland and Great Britain. They provided a high standard of ecclesiastical art during the Gothic revival of the 1800s and the building of Catholic churches which flourished in the first half of the 20th century.

The firm was founded by John Earley and his brother, sculptor Thomas Earley, who were born in Birmingham of Irish parents (probably from Drumshambo in County Leitrim). Thomas Earley was an apprentice at Hardman & Co. under Pugin. In 1851 Thomas Earley was responsible for setting up Hardman's exhibit of stained glass and metalwork at the Great Exhibition. He set up a similar exhibit at the International Dublin Exhibition of 1853. By November 1853, a shop was being prepared at 48 Grafton Street in Dublin for Hardman's ecclesiastical products.

In 1864, Thomas Earley and Edward Powell formed their own business at No. 1, Camden Street, calling it "Earley and Powell". Thomas's younger brother, John, began his apprenticeship in stained glass and also moved from Birmingham to Dublin. When John died young at 42, his son, also called John, became a renowned stained glass artist.

In November 1903, the grisaille stained glass, the largest of its kind in Ireland, was installed in St. Kevin's Church on Harrington Street by Earley and Co.. Other works included the Church of the Sacred Heart, Templemore, County Tipperary.

== See also ==
- Stained glass
- British and Irish stained glass (1811–1918)
