= St. Kevin's Church, Harrington Street, Dublin =

St. Kevin's Church
- St. Kevin's Church, Harrington Street
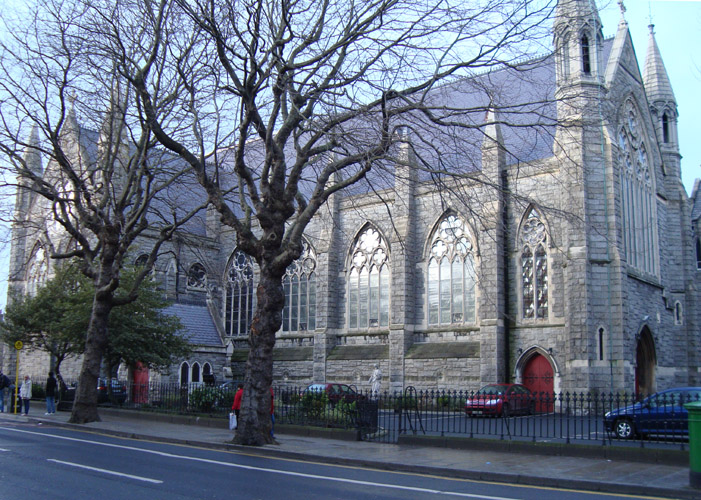
- St. Kevin's Church
- 53.332687°N 6.267714°W
- Location: Harrington St., Dublin
- Country: Ireland
- Denomination: Roman Catholic

History
- Status: Parish church
- Founded: 1867
- Dedication: Kevin of Glendalough
- Dedicated: 3 June 1872

Architecture
- Architect: George C. Ashlin
- Architectural type: Church
- Style: Gothic
- Groundbreaking: 1867
- Completed: 1872

Administration
- Archdiocese: Dublin
- Parish: St. Kevin's

St. Kevin's Church opened in Harrington St., Dublin, in 1872 to serve the Roman Catholic parish of St. Kevin, which had been split from St. Catherine's in 1865. It was named after the nearby St. Kevin's church in Camden Row, which dated back to at least the 12th century, but which had become Protestant after the Reformation.

In November 1903 a new organ was acquired and the grissille stained glass, the largest of its kind in Ireland, was installed. The work was done by Earley and Company of nearby Camden St. Francis Hubert Earley, a sculptor of note, carved the St. Michael and St. Gabriel statues flanking the high altar at St. Kevin's. Francis (1864-1921) was one of five brothers, three of whom were sculptors and two were stained glass artists.[ref: Michael Earley: Phd Thesis Dec 2023 NCAD 'Devotion and Tradition in Twentieth Century Irish Stained Glass 1903-1953 Earley & Co.']

The church is flanked by its Presbytery in Heytesbury Street and Synge Street CBS school in Synge St.

== Latin Mass ==
Since 15 September 2007 it has been the home of the Dublin Latin Mass Chaplaincy. As a result, it is the only location in Dublin where the Extraordinary Form of the Roman Rite (or Traditional Latin Mass) is licitly celebrated (as opposed to the valid but illicit celebration by the Society of Saint Pius X). After the promulgation of the Mass of Saint Paul VI, a free-standing altar was installed in order to facilitate the versus populum orientation of mass. However, it was later removed to facilitate the ad orientem style in which Tridentine Mass is celebrated. On 27 September 2017, Archbishop Dermot Martin was the homilist in a Solemn Mass for the tenth anniversary of Pope Benedict XVI’s Summorum Pontificum, which allowed for more freedom for priests wishing to celebrate the Extraordinary Form. In November 2013, a major restoration of the sanctuary was completed. Most notably, this included repairing the stained glass and re-decorating and re-painting the sanctuary wall and ceiling.

== External references ==
Website
