= Portobello, Dublin =

Inner city area of Dublin, Ireland

Portobello An Cuan Aoibhinn
- Inner suburb
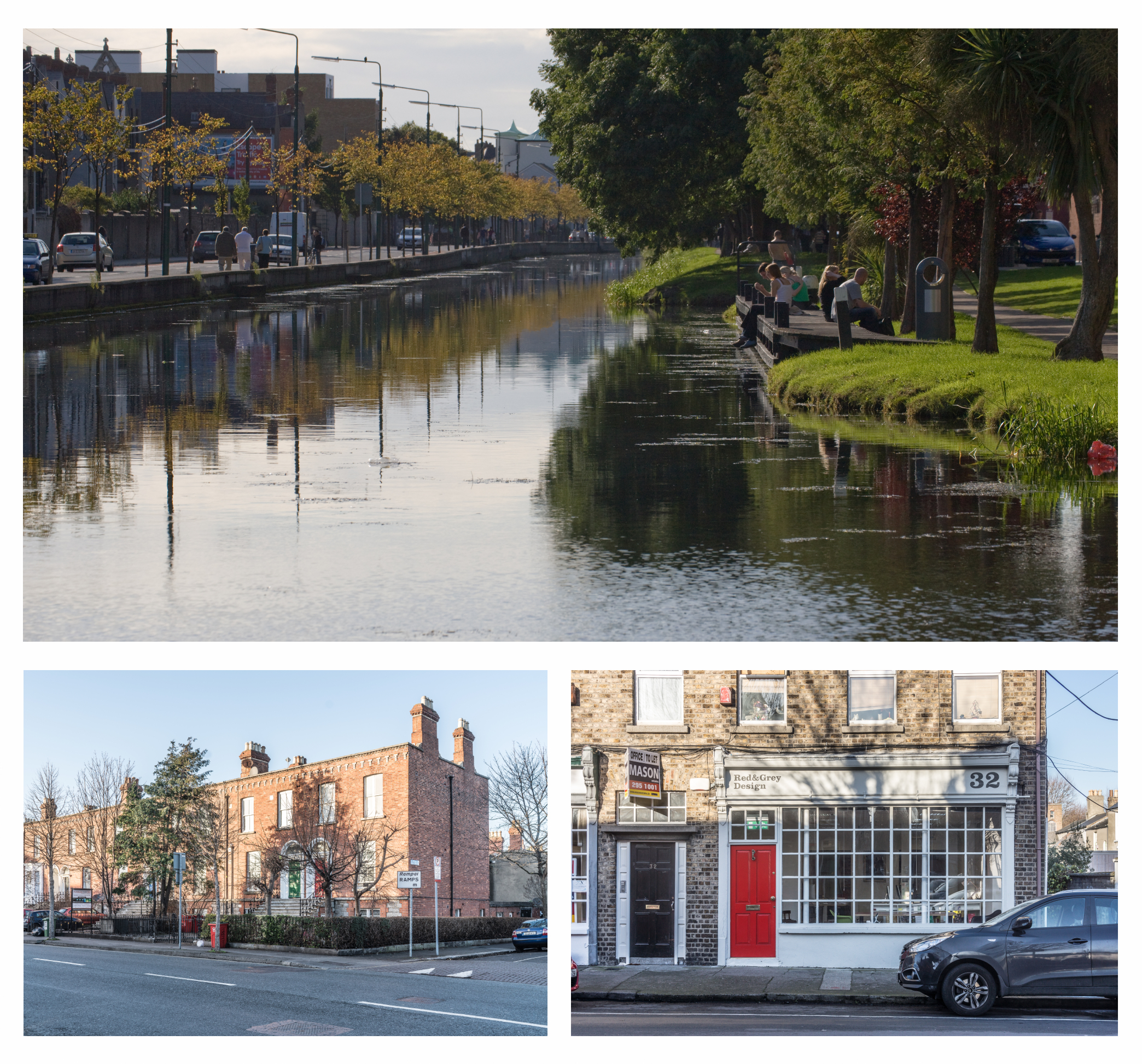
- Portobello, Dublin

- Location in Dublin
- Coordinates: 53°19′56″N 6°16′12″W
- Country: Ireland
- Province: Leinster
- City: Dublin
- Dáil constituency: Dublin Bay South
- EU Parliament: Dublin
- Time zone: UTC+0 (WET)
  - Summer (DST): UTC-1 (IST (WEST))
- Eircode routing key: D08

Portobello (Irish: Cuan Aoibhinn, meaning 'beautiful harbour') is an area of Dublin, Ireland, within the southern city centre and bounded to the south by the Grand Canal. It came into existence as a small suburb south of the city in the 18th century, centred on Richmond Street.

As a fast-expanding suburb during the 19th century, Portobello attracted many upwardly mobile families whose members went on to play important roles in politics, the arts and science. Towards the end of the century, many Ashkenazi Jews, fleeing pogroms in Russia and Eastern Europe, settled in the area; this led to Portobello being known as Dublin's "Little Jerusalem".

Portobello is in the Dublin 8 postal district, which is rendered as D08 under the Eircode system, as well as in the local electoral area of Dublin South East Inner City and the Dáil constituency of Dublin Bay South.

== History ==
The name Portobello also describes the stretch of the Grand Canal leading from Robert Emmet Bridge (Clanbrassil Street) to the bridge from South Richmond Street to Rathmines. Although usually referred to as Portobello Bridge, the correct name is La Touche Bridge (named after William Digges La Touche (1747–1803), scion of a prominent Dublin business family and a director of the Grand Canal Company). Like the Portobello Road of London and Portobello, Edinburgh, Dublin's Portobello was named for the capture by Admiral Edward Vernon in 1739 of Portobelo, Colón on Panama's Caribbean Coast, during the conflict between the United Kingdom and Spain known as the War of Jenkins' Ear.

=== 17th century ===
A century before the naming of the suburb, an eventful battle took place in the neighbourhood – the Battle of Rathmines. In the early years of the Irish Confederate Wars (1641–1649) incursions were made into the area as far as St. Kevin's church by bands of Confederate soldiers stationed in Wicklow. They made off with cattle, horses and the occasional wealthy merchant. After the Irish united with the Royalists against the Parliamentarians, an attempt was made to take Dublin. In the summer of 1649 the Duke of Ormonde, head of the forces of Royalists and Irish soldiers, approached Dublin, where the Parliamentarian army was holed up. For some unaccountable reason, he took his army over to Finglas, where he spent a month, which allowed the Roundheads to reinforce and plan their attack. By the time Ormonde's main force moved around to the south of the city, the Roundheads were ready and fighting broke out. Ormonde's army was defeated, many of them killed, and the place where they fell (mainly between Rathmines and Ranelagh) was known for a long time as the Bloody Fields. The name of the Bleeding Horse pub in Camden Street reputedly originated at this time from a horse wandering from the scene of the battle to St. Kevin's Port (now Camden Street).

The Bleeding Horse pub is reputed to be the second oldest pub in Dublin, allegedly licensed in 1649. Writers such as James Joyce, Oliver St. John Gogarty and John Elwood were familiar with this tavern.

=== 18th century ===
Portobello was part of the Manor of St. Sepulchre, one of the liberties of Dublin. The courthouse (still standing) and gaol for the use of the manor were located at the corner of Long Lane and New Bride Street.

=== 19th and 20th centuries ===
==== The Barracks ====
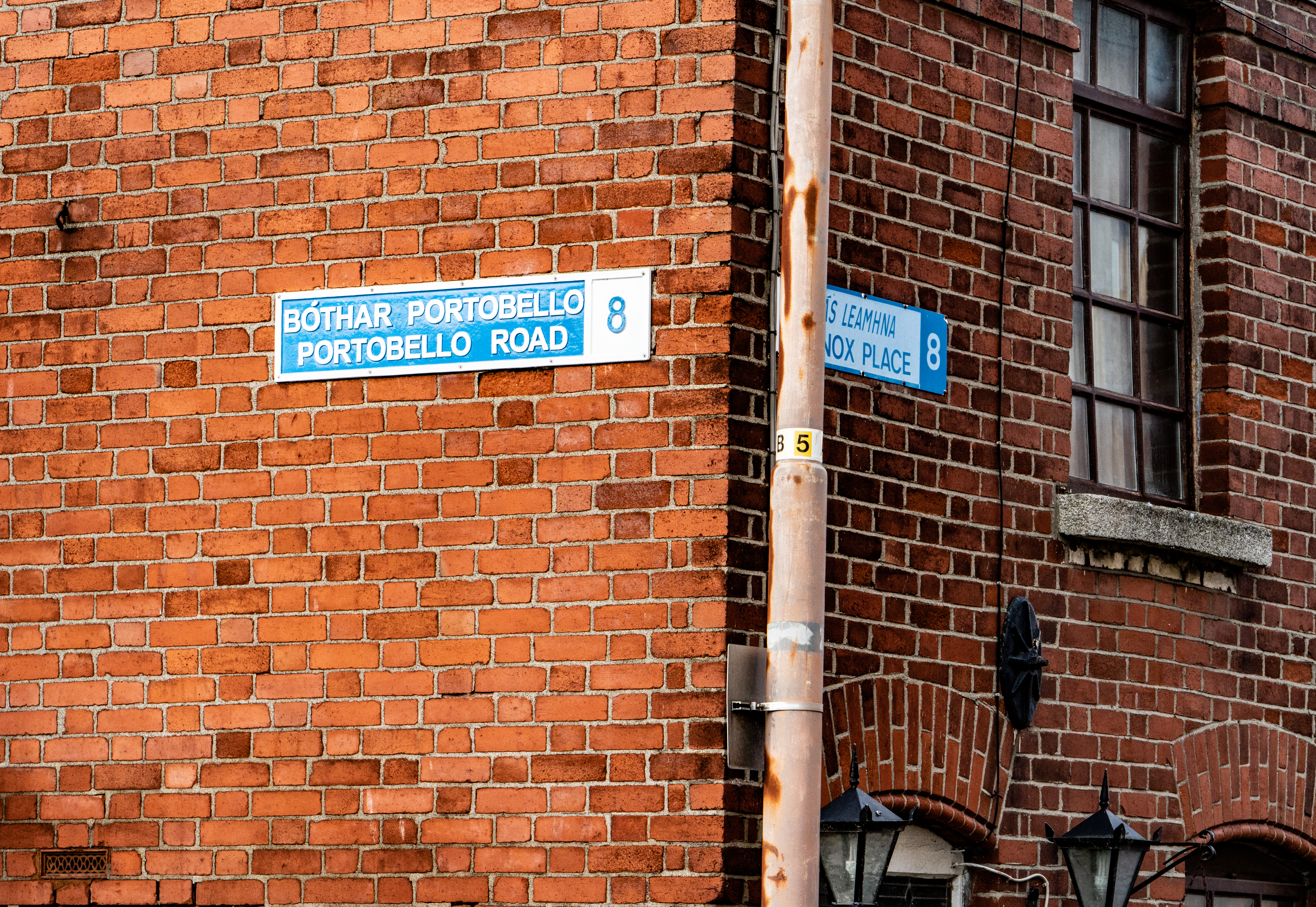
Street signs in Portobello

The nearby Portobello Barracks (now Cathal Brugha Barracks) was constructed between 1810 and 1815, and has been in continual use since then.

In 1817, William Windham Sadlier successfully flew in a hot air balloon from Portobello Barracks to Holyhead in North Wales.

The 1837 Ordnance Survey map showed one building on the western side of Richmond St. (excluding property belonging to the Portobello Hotel), which corresponds to no. 34, which was later the Caroline Records shop (closed in 2003).

In 1867, at the time of the Fenian Uprising, security was stepped up, and an innocent young resident of Bloomfield Avenue, walking his dog in the vicinity, was accused of breaking and entry, among other things. Admittedly, he had a hard time explaining away the gun and eighteen bullets he had in his pocket, but he was acquitted of any wrongdoing.

The barracks was the scene of a sensational murder on 27 December 1873, when the body of Gunner Colin Donaldson was found slumped across the bed of Anne Wyndford Marshall, in the apartment she shared with her husband. He had been poisoned with Hydrogen cyanide, which Mrs. Marshall had purchased in Rathmines a few days previously. The inquest on 8 January 1874 heard that Donaldson and Marshall had had disagreements on several occasions but ended up on good terms. Although the evidence was stacked against her, at her trial on 10 February the jury found Mrs. Marshall not guilty.

Portobello Barracks was, up until the 1916 Rising, the home of the 4th Battalion Royal Irish Fusiliers, which was under the command of John Henry Patterson.

The barracks was adopted as General Michael Collins' Military Headquarters after the Irish War of Independence. The barracks hospital became Collins' home when he set up his headquarters, it was from here that he set off to Cork, the day he was killed 22 August 1922.

==== Basin ====
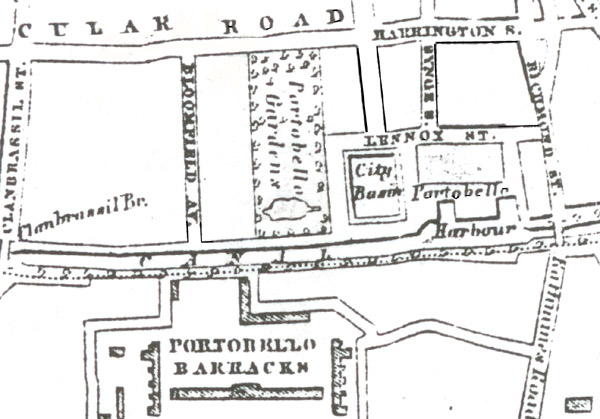
Portobello about 1840. On the west, Clanbrassil St., on the east, Sth. Richmond St. Click to enlarge.

The Dublin section of the Grand Canal was opened on 23 April 1796, while Portobello Harbour came into use in 1801. In 1812 Richmond Basin, Portobello, (later called the "City Basin"), located between Lennox Street and the canal, was opened as a water reservoir for the south side of the city. From 1860 investigations of the water quality coming from the Basin showed that it was not up to standard – in particular, levels of sulphuric acid were relatively high. Public representatives from Rathmines were unwilling to supply the necessary money for new water-works, but the will of the majority prevailed, and the new Vartry Reservoir was completed in 1863.

==== Hotel ====
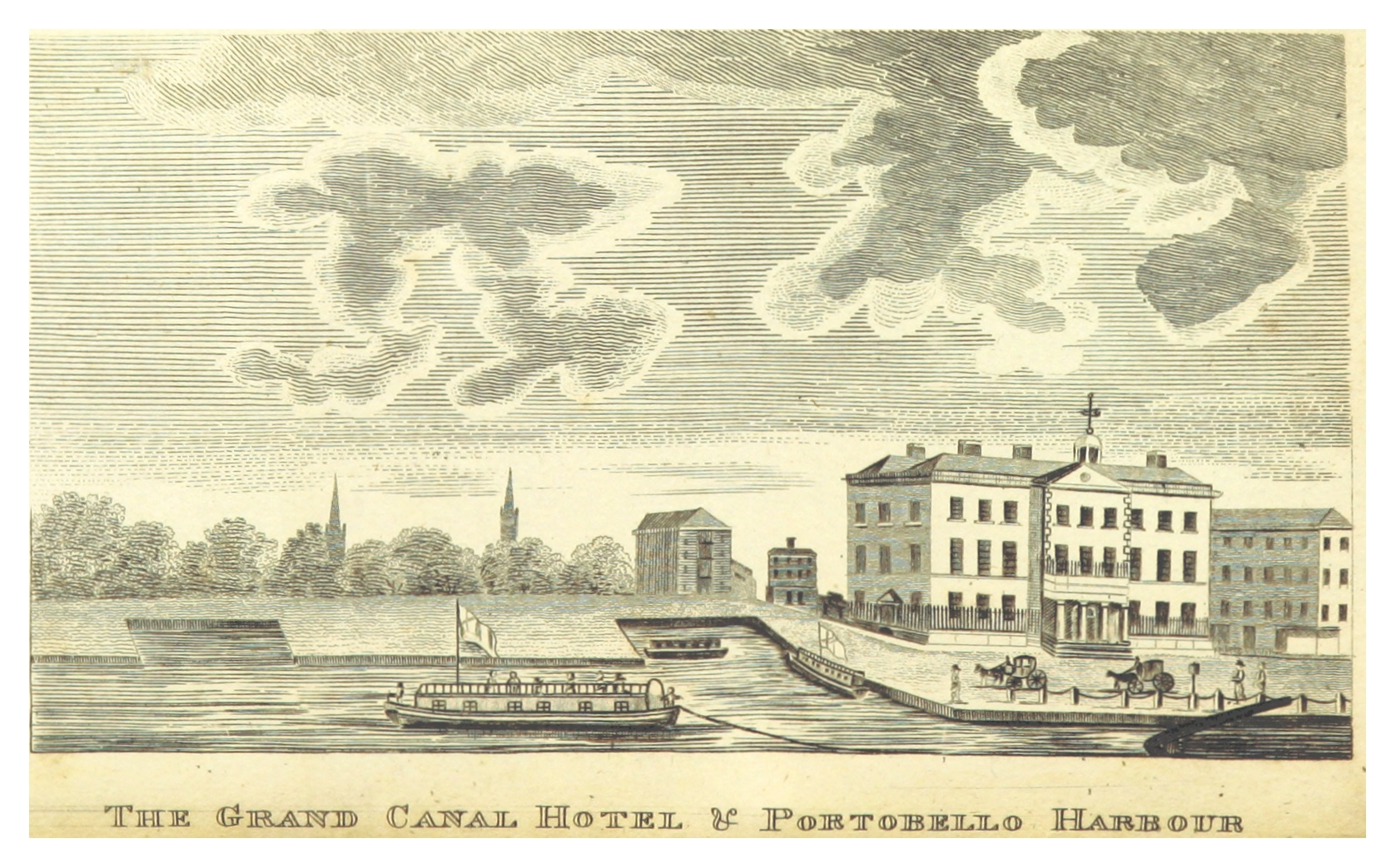
The Grand Canal Hotel & Portobello Harbour circa 1811

The hotel at the harbour, the Grand Canal Hotel, was opened in 1807 (the architect was James Colbourne). In 1858, it was taken over by a Catholic order of nuns, who used it as an asylum (St. Mary's) for blind girls. A few years later they successfully appealed to the Guardians of the South Dublin Union for some finance (it cost £10 to keep a girl for a year), though The Irish Times in an editorial frowned upon this proselytising by "Romanists", while they lauded the efforts of the Protestant-run "Home for Orphans" at 7 South Richmond Street (which advertised frequently for "fresh souls to save" in the same newspaper). Ten years later the asylum was sold to a Mr. Isaac Cole, who renovated it and returned it to its original function as a hotel, to accommodate 100 persons. It was popular among officers visiting the nearby Portobello Barracks (who would occasionally pop across South Richmond Street to the Grand Canal Tavern for a drink) and claimed it was the nearest hotel to the Royal Dublin Society grounds. However, it was slow in providing catering facilities – in 1871 a Rathmines businessman, in a letter to the Irish Times, lamented the absence of restaurants in the neighbourhood, and enjoined upon Mr. Cole to provide same, preferably a two-course meal for two shillings (the price to include beer and punch). In the 20th century the building became a nursing home.

==== Observatory ====
Thomas Grubb (1800–1878), a notable optician, developed his first telescope in a small house between Portobello Bridge and Charlemont Bridge and erected a public observatory at No. 1 Upper Charlemont Street. He founded the Grubb Telescope Company. One of his earliest instruments – the telescope for Markree Observatory in County Sligo – was, for several years, the largest telescope in the world. They provided the telescopes for many observatories worldwide, including Melbourne, Vienna and Aldershot Observatory in 1891. The company was acquired in 1925 by Charles Algernon Parsons and renamed Sir Howard Grubb, Parsons and Co. Ltd.

==== Development ====
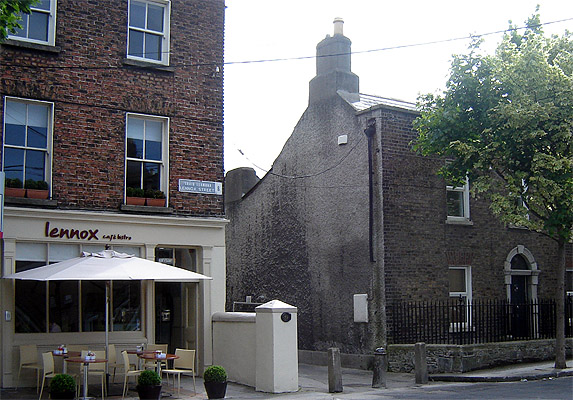
A new cafe and one of the oldest houses in Lennox St., facing Synge St

Most of the area was developed in the latter half of the 19th century, the houses along the South Circular Road being built between 1850 and 1870, although the smaller houses off Lennox Street were built by the Dublin Artisans' Dwellings Company sometime later, from 1885 (just in time, in fact, for the increasing number of Jews looking for houses in the area). This company also built houses on that part of Portobello Basin that was filled in 1883.

In 1868, a new street was opened to connect Harold's Cross with Lower Clanbrassil Street The Lord Mayor, the Aldermen and Frederick Stokes, who had purchased the land and led the project, attended the opening. The street was to be called Kingsland Street, but in fact, that name was never used, and it became Upper Clanbrassil Street.

=== Transport ===
From the 1850s, horse-drawn omnibuses provided transport along South Richmond Street from Rathmines to the city centre. On 6 October 1871 work was commenced on the Dublin tram system on Rathmines Road, a few yards from Portobello Bridge. They came into operation the following year, linking Rathgar, via Richmond Street, with College Green. There was just one standard fare within the city limits, which was much cheaper than the old horse-drawn omnibuses. That year also the long-awaited improvements to Portobello Bridge (after the fatal accident of 1861) were carried out, the Tramway Company paying one-third of the total cost of £300.

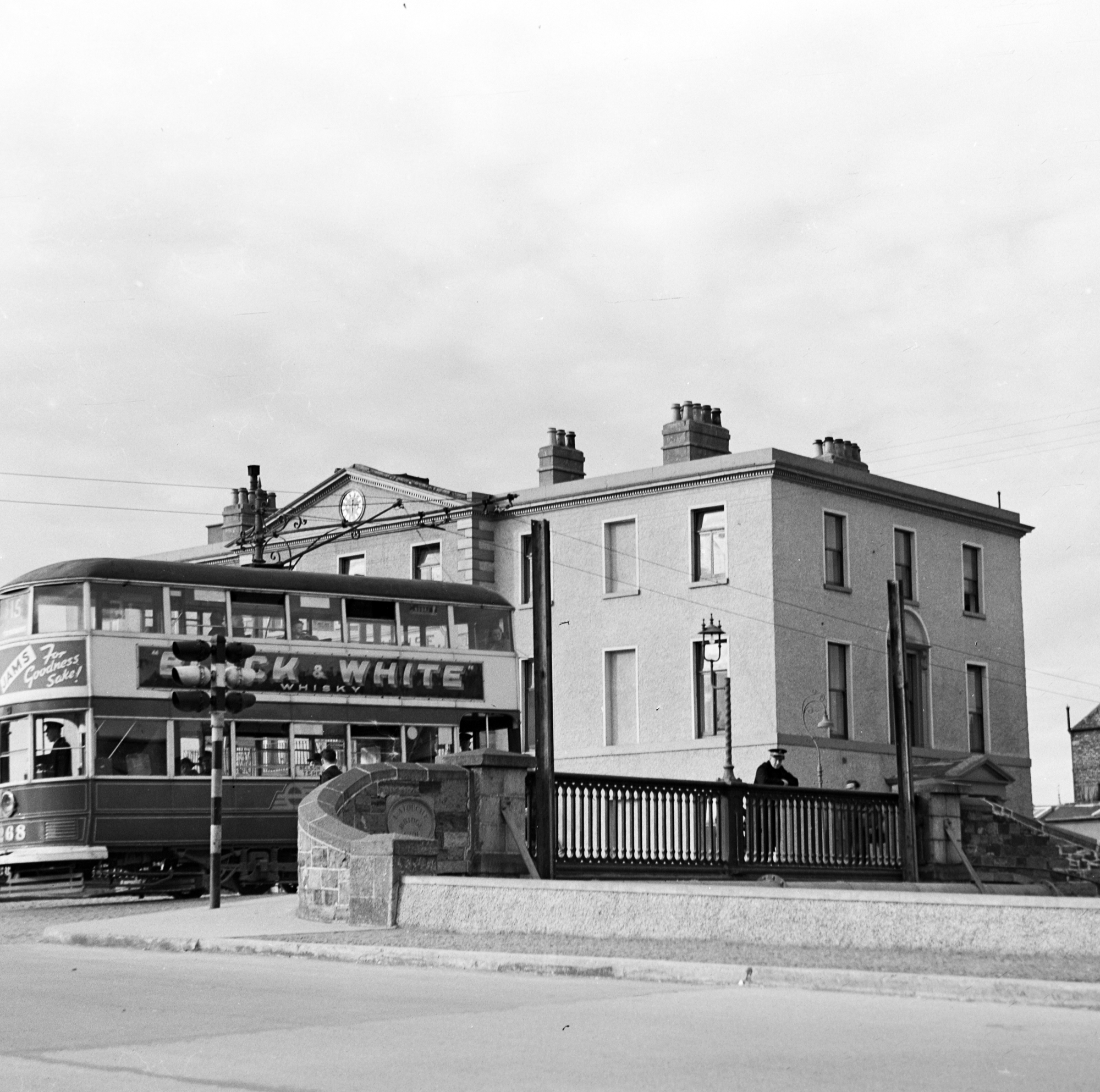
A Dublin tramways tram crosses over the Grand Canal

At the time the trams were introduced an impediment to efficient transport along Richmond Street was the curve in the street at Moyer's building works (west corner of Lennox Street, was part of the Portobello College complex until its demolition in 2006). The constant traffic in and out of Moyer's blocked the traffic at this narrow spot. Despite complaints, the curve was never removed and is there to this day.

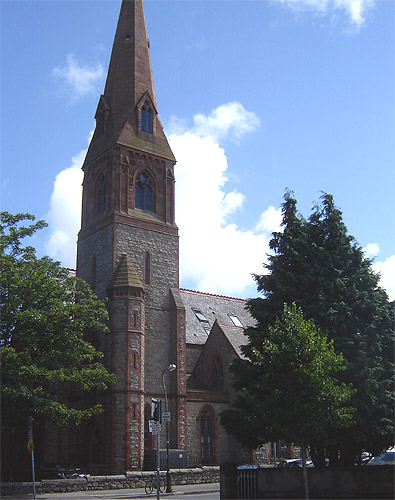
The former Church of Ireland St. Kevin's church stands on the location of the old Portobello Gardens, South Circular Road, Portobello

==== Portobello Gardens ====
Part of Lennox Street, Victoria Street and Florence Street stretching from the canal to the South Circular Road were part of the Kingsland estate, which contained a park with a large pond and fountains, which opened as the Royal Portobello Gardens in 1839. The name survives in Kingsland Park Avenue. From 1858, Mssrs. Kirby and Webb leased the Portobello Gardens. Kirby was a pyrotechnician who lived in Sackville Street. During the summer months, gas and Chinese lamps illuminated the gardens, a band played outdoors, and the public were entertained by acrobats, dancers and "a highly trained troupe of performing dogs". And of course, fireworks.

In June 1850, the celebrated circus owner and performer, Pablo Fanque (a black man, later immortalised in The Beatles song "Being for the Benefit of Mr. Kite!" written entirely from his circus advertisement) announced that the sponsor of the events at the gardens "has the honor to inform the Nobility, Gentry, and the Public that he has entered into an arrangement with Mr. Pablo Fanque for three Grand Equestrian Day fetes, which will take place on the 10th, 12th, and 14th of June in an immense Pavilion which will be erected for the purpose." The same advertisements announced performances by R. W. Pelham, the American minstrel.

A huge crowd attraction at the gardens was the well-known tightrope walker Charles Blondin, who first performed at the gardens in August 1860. The previous year he had caused a sensation by crossing the Niagara Falls on a tightrope. In May, at the Crystal Palace, he had carried across a stove on the rope, then, still suspended on the wire, proceeded to cook omelettes, which he distributed to the audience below. On the evening of 23 August 1860, however, as the crowd packed the gardens, the tightrope broke, which led to the supporting scaffolding collapsing. Blondin was not injured, but two workers who were on the scaffolding fell to their deaths. Although they appeared as witnesses at an initial investigation, Blondin and his manager failed to appear at a further one (they were in the USA) and a warrant was issued for their arrest. However, things must have been ironed out, because August of the following year found the "far-famed unambulist performing his arduous and daring exploits" at the gardens, followed by "Madame Veroni's magic exploits".

Meanwhile, the proprietor of the gardens, Kirby, the pyrotechnician, was having problems with a pyromaniac, several attempts having been made on his property. In 1862 Kirby was the victim of arson, both the music hall in the gardens and his house in Sackville Street were burned down, resulting in high claims for compensation. Plans for developing the land at the gardens for housing started around this time. Frederick Stokes, J.P., an Englishman, the main developer of Rathmines and Portobello at the time, and Chairman of the Rathmines Township Commissioners, who drained it and let it out in building lots, purchased the land.

==== Kingsland Park ====
The original name of Victoria Street was Kingsland Park, which was developed from 1865 by Frederick Stokes. Some of the houses in this street remained empty for some time after they were built and were frequented by "ladies of the night", who catered to the nearby Portobello Barracks. As a result, the street acquired a bad reputation and respectable families moved out. Even after the ladies moved on, the bad reputation of the street remained, and thus the name was changed to Victoria Street. For a similar reason, Liverpool Road became Portobello Road and Bloomfield Place/Rosanna Place became Windsor Terrace.

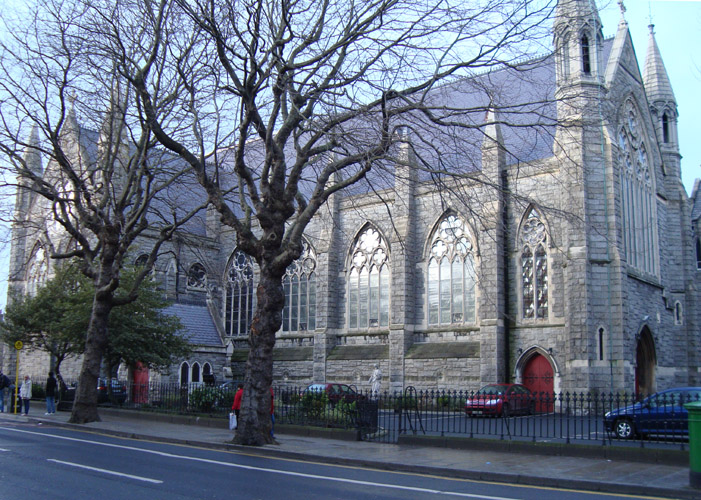
Harrington St. RC church (St. Kevin's), built 1871

==== Emorville ====
Across the road from Portobello Gardens was the Emorville Estate, which was sold and developed from around the mid-1860s by Joseph Kelly, proprietor of the City Saw Mills in Thomas Street. Today Emorville Avenue marks the spot. Before it was broken up Leinster Cricket Club (founded 1852) used it as their grounds, until they moved to their present grounds in Observatory Lane in 1865. Portobello had a cricket team of its own, but the location of its grounds has yet to be discovered. Included in this development was a small DMP police station at the corner of Emor Street and South Circular Road, which closed after the Free State came into being.

==== Street names ====
Several older streets in the neighbourhood (i.e., Richmond, Harrington, Lennox, Heytesbury and Camden) were named after British Viceroys. Newer streets were often named after the estates they were built on. Stamer Street, developed around 1880, was named after Sir William Stamer, Lord Mayor in 1809 and 1819 (a relative of his, Standish O'Grady, was killed in a duel in 1830 by Captain Smith from Portobello Barracks, who received twelve months for manslaughter). Foundlings left at Harrington Street church were usually named after one of the surrounding streets.

Between 1916 and 1921, Portobello and its eponymously named barracks were the scene of several incidents (see Of historical interest).

The junction of Camden Street Old and South Richmond Street looking towards Kelly's Corner and Camden Street, in the mid-1950s

The main employer locally in the inter-war period and afterwards was Ever-Ready Batteries at Portobello Harbour. The factory is now closed and small businesses and attractive apartments occupy the space. The remainder of Portobello Harbour, located next to the Ever-Ready factory, was drained in 1948 and largely filled in.

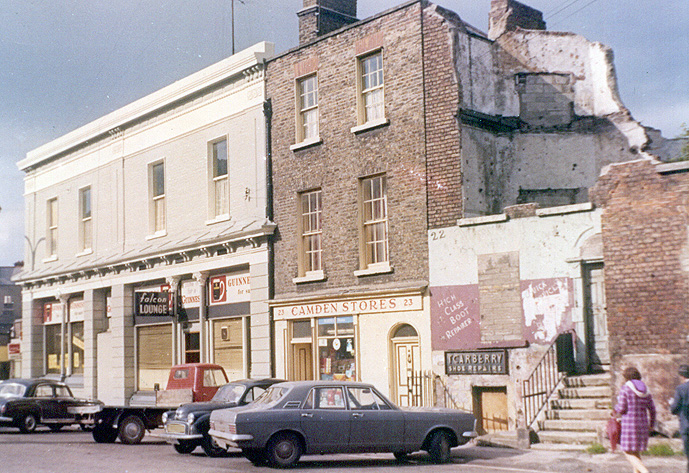
The Bleeding Horse (it was renamed The Falcon between 1965 and 1985), Camden Street, in 1972

In the 1960s, the Garda Club opened in Harrington Street (it is still used for social occasions) and Synge Street School obtained a new building fronting onto Heytesbury Street. The Bleeding Horse pub came under new management, introduced plastic fittings and changed its name to The Falcon.

Starting in the 1980s Kelly's Corner was re-developed. Camden Street Old and Charlotte Street disappeared and the ruined buildings there made way for the Camden Court Hotel. The north side of Harcourt Road was developed, Stein's Opticians being the last to go in the first phase, and Gleeson's pub in the second.

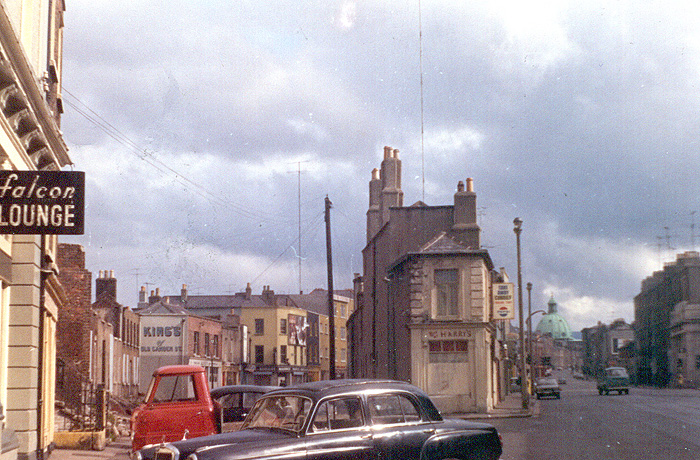
Camden Street Old (left) and Camden Street Upper (right) in 1972

In the 1990s, the east side of Charlemont Street and Grand Parade made way for offices, apartments and the Hilton Hotel. The Falcon was renovated and became again The Bleeding Horse. A few years later the Luas made its appearance on the old Harcourt Street-Bray railway line.

Nowadays community groups meet in St. Kevin's Hall, Bloomfield Avenue and Heytesbury Street. A monthly market is held behind the Bernard Shaw pub on Richmond Street.

The Grand Canal looking west from Portobello bridge

The reclaimed land at Portobello Harbour is now a leisure area and is often used for skateboarding. Next to it is the private Lamrin Business School, and just around the corner are various shops, pubs and restaurants, giving the locality a lively and vibrant air. South Richmond Street is part of the "Golden Mile" of music venues and bars leading into the city centre.

The Grand Canal was restored in the mid-1980s and underwent further restoration more recently. It remains in use as a recreational amenity, frequented by local residents and swans owned by the corporation.

== Little Jerusalem ==
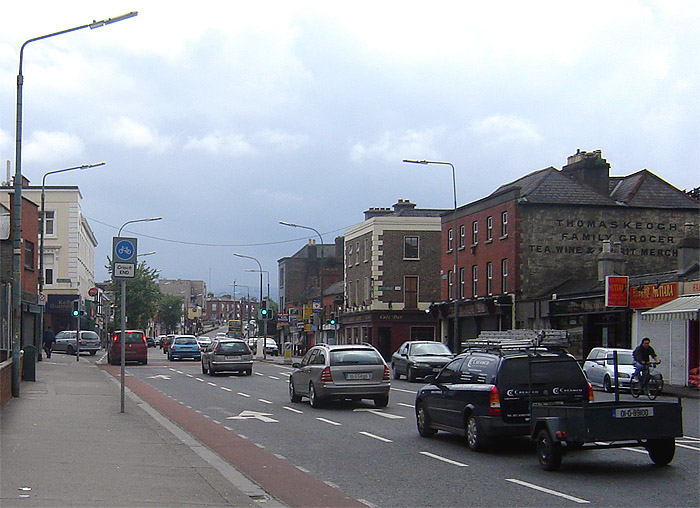
Leonard's Corner and Upper Clanbrassil Street, looking towards Robert Emmet Bridge

The area was also known as Little Jerusalem because in the first half of the twentieth century it was at the heart of the Jewish community in Dublin. The first Jews fleeing conditions in Lithuania (then part of the Russian Empire) arrived in the early 1870s and eventually settled off Lower Clanbrassil Street.

Over the next few decades as they became more prosperous many moved to the South Circular Road, Longwood Avenue, Bloomfield Avenue (where a Jewish school was opened) and other parts of Portobello. The shopping area of Little Jerusalem stretched along Lower Clanbrassil Street where there were many Jewish shops and businesses, mixed with local Irish, for example Eastman butchers, who carried out the ritual slaughtering until a Jewish slaughterhouse was established in Vincent Street. For a long time local (non-Jewish) children earned their pocket money by lighting fires and doing odd jobs (the Shabbat goy) for the Jews on their Sabbath.

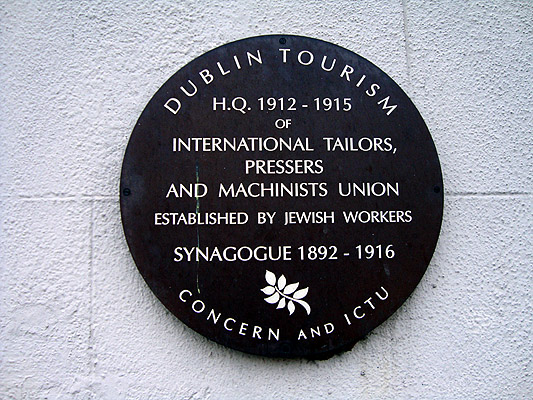
Plaque to trade union and synagogue, 52 Camden St.

Founder of the well-known family firm, Myer Wigoder was born in Lithuania but had to flee after a pogrom. He started a Hebrew class near Kelly's Corner and a synagogue in Camden Street. His son Harry lived at 32 Charlemont Street and was a well-known soccer player. Another son, a doctor, married into the family of dentist Harry/Henry Bradlaw (son of Robert Brudno of Smorgon naturalised as Robert Bradlaw), of 4 Harrington St. Robert Bradlaw became a leader of the community and founded a synagogue in St. Kevin's Parade and the cemetery in Dolphin's Barn, where he is buried. Also from Lithuania, Ada Shillman came to Dublin in 1892 and became a midwife. She started a dispensary for Jewish women in Bloomfield Avenue and helped found Saint Ultan's Children's Hospital in Charlemont Street. Her son Bernard became a distinguished Senior Counsel.

In the local elections for Dublin Corporation in 1902, the Socialist candidate James Connolly, standing for Wood Quay ward, was the only candidate to distribute his election leaflets in the area in Yiddish.

The International Tailors, Machinists and Pressers' Trade Union was founded in November 1908 (and registered in April 1909) by Jewish clothing workers hailing from the South Circular Road area. Its HQ was at 52 Camden Street (located next to the headquarters for Concern Worldwide). Aaron Klein of 14 Warren Street was its first treasurer. A later Secretary was Isaac Baker from Emorville Avenue.

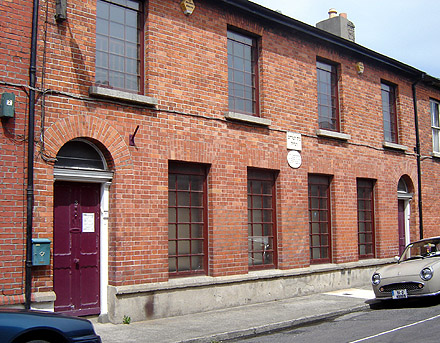
The Jewish Museum on Walworth Road

The Jewish presence in the area declined following the end of World War II, with a number of Jews emigrating to Israel, and the majority leaving for New York. Though the main Jewish population that remained in Dublin have moved out to Terenure, just five kilometres (three miles) away, a small number still live in the area, but their own shops, schools, and small businesses no longer exist.

The Irish Jewish Museum is located on Walworth Road. One of the items in the museum includes a Guinness bottle sold in the area with a customised label printed in Hebrew. The long-standing Kosher bakery, the Bretzel, is still in Lennox Street, under new management. In early 2011 the museum launched an appeal for a £9 million expansion of its Walworth Road premises, which was supported by the Office of Public Works.

In 2022, six Stolpersteine commemorating the six Irish Jews who were murdered during the Holocaust were installed as a memorial at St. Catherine's National School in memory of Ettie Steinberg, her husband Wojtech Gluck and their son Leon Gluck, murdered in Auschwitz and Isaac Shishi, killed at Viekšniai, Lithuania in 1941; and Ephraim and Jeanne (Lena) Saks (siblings), killed at Auschwitz in 1944. They had moved to continental Europe before the outbreak of World War II.

During the 1916 Easter Rising, several Jewish women from the community smuggled ammunition from Portobello, Dublin's Jewish quarter, to the then-named Sackville Street, where the rebels occupied the General Post Office and other strategic buildings. Most notable of these women was the artist Estella Solomons, who used to hide ammunition under a vegetable patch at the back of her family home. The Cumann na mBan women worked as agents transferring ammunition, able to avoid detection at that time precisely because they were women.

== Institutions ==
The main school in the area is Synge Street CBS, which was the setting for the award-winning 2016 film, Sing Street. The movie, directed by John Carney (director), was mostly made in Dublin, including in areas around Portobello like the Catholic Church in Harrington Street (St. Kevin's), named after the nearby St. Kevin's medieval church. The school was built next to the Christian Brothers monastery in 1871. On the other side of Synge Street is St. Kevin's Hall, which used to be the meeting place for the Catholic Boy Scouts and Girl Guides.

There used to be a Jewish school in Bloomfield Avenue (now Bloomfield House) and synagogues in Walworth Road (established 1917, now the Jewish Museum) and in Adelaide Road, but these are all closed now (new facilities have been set up elsewhere). On Adelaide Road a Presbyterian Church (still functioning) was built in 1841 for a congregation of 800, and in 1863 a smaller chapel for the Irvingites, which later became St. Finian's Lutheran church (also still functioning).

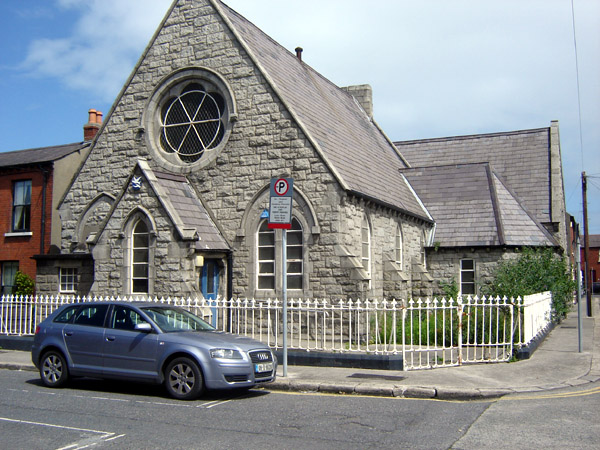
The former Methodist Church in Victoria Street

The many Muslims now living in the area attend the Dublin Mosque (formerly the Donore Presbyterian Church, built 1884) further along the South Circular Road, and there is also a centre in Harrington Street. The local Church of Ireland church, St. Kevin's (whose construction, in 1883, was financed by a bequest from a Miss Jane Shannon, of Rathgar, architect, Thomas Drew), was closed in the 1970s and tastefully converted to apartments, while the adjacent church buildings became a community centre. The little church at the top of Victoria Street formerly belonged to the Methodist Congregation, called Kingsland Methodist Church, and after closing in the 1950s was used as a women's Employment Exchange. The Methodists also ran the Female Orphanage School in Harrington St., which was founded in 1804 and closed in the mid-20th century.

Portobello College was a private institution established in 1989 and located mainly in Portobello House. It was firstly taken over by the Institute of Education (under owner Raymond Kearns) and then in 2009 by the Dublin Business School (owned by Kaplan, Inc., a subsidiary of The Washington Post Company). The students were relocated to the DBS facility in George's St. In 2011, one of India's largest educational institutions, the Rayat Bahra Group, moved into nearby Harbour House, once a part of Portobello College, and set up the Lamrin Business School.

In 2009, a new national and cultural centre was opened in the Christian Brothers monastery on Synge St. called The Lantern, which aims to be a place of hospitality to promote intercultural and interfaith dialogue. The name "lantern" was chosen to celebrate the life of Nano Nagle, who searched the back lanes of Cork each evening with her lantern seeking those who lacked food and shelter. She inspired Edmund Ignatius Rice to found the Congregation of Christian Brothers and the Presentation Brothers with her work for the poor and disadvantaged.

In May 2011, the new Minister for Justice, Equality and Defence, Alan Shatter opened a Cathal Brugha Barracks Visitors centre to the public commemorating those that fought for the Irish War of Independence.

== Notable residents ==
The earliest written accounts we have of residents in the area date from the 18th century—as the city spread southwards houses on the main roads or in select by-roads such as Charlemont Mall were occupied by the better-off citizens. This trend continued in the first half of the 19th century, but with the development of the smaller streets from around 1860 and finally the artisans' dwellings, a mix of classes ended up in the area. By the beginning of the 20th century, the grand houses that had been erected along the Grand Canal had been turned into poverty-stricken tenements, while more exclusive suburbs such as Terenure and Rathgar became the havens of the rich. The following list shows the range of people that have been associated with the area over the past 200 years.

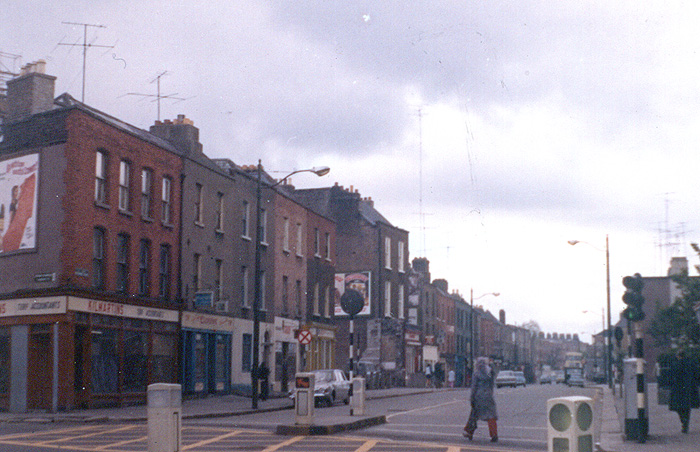
Charlemont Street (early 70s)

- Eamonn Andrews (1922–1987), well-known radio and then television presenter, was born on Synge Street and attended Synge Street CBS.
- Edward Synge had his Dublin family home in Kevin Street Palace. He was a distant relation of the noted playwright John Millington Synge.
- Leonard Abrahamson, Gaelic scholar, who switched to medicine and became a professor, lodged with the Nurock family near Leonard's Corner while studying at Trinity College Dublin.
- Ivana Bacik (born 1968), TD for Dublin Bay South since the 2021 by-election, Senator for the Dublin University constituency from 2007 to 2021, is currently a resident of Portobello; her grandfather was a founding member of Waterford Crystal in 1947.
- The Black family (Mary Black, Frances Black and their siblings) grew up on Charlemont Street and attended music sessions in O'Connell's of Richmond Street.
- Leopold Bloom, the fictional Jewish character at the heart of the James Joyce novel Ulysses, lived at "52 Clanbrassil Street"; a plaque commemorating this can be found on the wall of 52 Upper Clanbrassil Street.
- Harry Boland (1887–1922), an Irish republican politician and member of the First Dáil, lived with his family at 26 Lennox Street and attended Synge Street school.
- Philip Brady (1898–1995) was the owner of the well-known pharmacy at Kelly's Corner and the family house next door. He was a TD for 26 years up to 1977 and was a Lord Mayor of the city. His son Gerard was also a TD and a cabinet minister.
- David Davin-Power grew up on the South Circular Road, corner of Victoria Street, where his father was a doctor.
- Denis O'Dea the actor came from 54 Richmond St., where his mother kept a boarding house. He married actress Siobhán McKenna in 1956 and they lived in the house until the late sixties. They had a son Donnacha O'Dea, who was a pupil of Synge Street CBS.
- Cearbhall Ó Dálaigh (1911–1978), fifth President of Ireland, lived much of his life in No 15 Portobello Road.
- Frank Edwards (1907–1983), a prominent Irish Communist worked the latter part of his life as a teacher in the Jewish, Zion School on Bloomfield Avenue, he was a teacher by profession, after 1940 he was blacklisted from teaching in all the Catholic-run State Schools by the Archbishop John Charles McQuaid, for his involvement with Connolly Column.
- Barry Fitzgerald (1888–1961), the Abbey actor who was awarded an Oscar, and his brother Arthur Shields, Abbey actor, 1916 Volunteer and Hollywood actor, were born in Walworth Road.
- Chaim Herzog (1918–1997), sixth president of Israel, grew up in 33 Bloomfield Avenue. His father, Yitzhak HaLevi Herzog, a renowned Talmudic scholar, was the first Chief Rabbi of Ireland, and later of Palestine and Israel. Yaakov Herzog son of Yitzhak was also born and lived with the family in Dublin.
- Immanuel Jakobovits (1921–1999), while serving as Chief Rabbi of Ireland (1948–1958), lived in Bloomfield Avenue.
- Harry Kernoff (1900–1974) was an Irish painter who lived and had a studio under the roof of 1 Stamer Street. He was of London/Russian Jewish extraction, and is primarily remembered for his sympathetic interest in Dublin and its people. Some of his work includes the local scenery such as La Touche bridge.
- Jack Lukeman (better known as Jack L) lived for a number of years at the beginning of the South Circular Road, Portobello, where he could regularly be seen loading up the equipment for a gig.
- Grace Plunkett (née Gifford) (1888–1955), widow of Joseph Plunkett, died in her apartment in South Richmond Street and was taken to Harrington Street church for a state funeral.
- Michael O'Riordan (1917–2006), who fought in the International Brigades during the Spanish Civil War and became head of the Communist Party of Ireland, lived for many years in Victoria Street.
- Cornelius Ryan (1920–1974) was born on Heytesbury Street and served as an altar boy in Harrington Street church. He became a journalist and author known for his writings on military history, especially his World War II books: The Longest Day (1959), The Last Battle (1966), and A Bridge Too Far (1974).
- Maurice Levitas (1917–2001), born in Portobello, later joined the Communist Party of Great Britain, took part in the Battle of Cable Street and fought in the International Brigades during the Spanish Civil War. He is the father of Ruth Levitas.
- Jack Murphy (1920–1984), trade unionist and politician, was born in 1920 at the back of Synge Street. He was elected to the Dáil in 1957 as the candidate of the Unemployed Protest Committee (UPC).
- William Mulholland (1855–1935) an Irish-American dam civil engineer, the first superintendent and chief engineer of Los Angeles Department of Water and Power. He was brought up in underprivileged circumstances, his family could only afford to rent a house on Synge Street during his youth.
- Richard Mulcahy (1886–1971), Took over as National Army Commander-in-Chief following the death of Michael Collins. Him, his wife Josephine Ryan and family moved into Lissenfield House beside Portobello Barracks for security reasons.
- George William Russell (1867–1935), the writer and painter known as AE, lived at 33 Emorville Avenue after his family moved to Dublin, and attended Dr Power's school in Harrington Street from 1878 to 1882.
- John Hughes (1865–1941), a notable Irish sculptor, lived in No. 28 Lennox Street. Probably his best-known work was a large statue of Queen Victoria, unveiled outside Leinster house by Edward VII in 1904. After independence, the statue was stored at various locations before being given to the Australian government by the Irish government and it now stands outside the Queen Victoria Building in Sydney.
- Cecil Sheridan (1910–1980), actor and lyricist, lived at 65 South Circular Road, Portobello and attended local Synge Street CBS.
- The parents of James Joyce stayed at 30 Emorville Avenue in 1881, before moving to Rathgar where James was born the following year. Before their marriage they had both lived in different houses on Clanbrassil Street.
- Paul Smith (1920–1997), writer, some of whose books (The Countrywoman, Summer Sang in Me, etc.) were set in tenements alongside the Grand Canal, was born close to Portobello Bridge.
- Lord Edward FitzGerald, the Society of United Irishmen leader of 1798 fame, had a hiding place at Portobello Harbour, until 13 May 1798, at a house belonging to a widow named Dillon.
- Henry Grattan, the notable parliamentarian, had a house close to Portobello Bridge, which was presented to him by the citizens of Dublin. The widow of his second son resided there after his death.
- John Mitchel, the Young Irelander and editor of The Nation was living with his family at 8 Ontario Terrace (located on the Rathmines side of Portobello Bridge) when he was arrested in 1848.
- The playwright George Bernard Shaw (1856–1950) was born on Synge Street.
- Captain Jack White DSO (1879–1946), co-founder of the Irish Citizen Army who fought on the Republican side in the Spanish Civil War lived at 19 Harrington St. while he was developing the Citizen Army from 1913.
- Jack Butler Yeats (1871–1957) the painter lived for several years before his death in the nursing home at Portobello Harbour. His wife, Mary Cottenham, known as Cottie, had died there in 1947.

== Of historical interest ==
=== 1861: A terrible tragedy at Portobello Bridge ===
At 9 o'clock on the evening of Saturday, 6 April 1861 near Portobello Bridge, a horse-drawn bus, driven by Patrick Hardy, had just dropped off a passenger and started up the steep incline of the bridge when one of the horses started to rear. The driver tried to turn the horses but both horses became uncontrollable with fear and backed the bus through the wooden rails of the bridge. The bus, horses and six passengers inside the bus, plunged into the dark cold waters of the canal lock, which was about 6 metres (20 feet) deep, with 3 metres (10 feet) of water at the bottom. The conductor was able to jump clear and a passing policeman pulled the driver from the water. Despite the frantic efforts of passers-by, in particular, a constable and a soldier from Portobello Barracks who broke their way into the submerged bus, all inside were drowned. One of those killed was the father of the Gunne brothers, who opened the Gaiety Theatre. Two were mothers, each with a little girl, one of them a niece of Daniel O'Connell.

The repercussions of this tragedy were felt for a long time in the area. Passengers on horse-drawn vehicles had to alight at Portobello Bridge and walk across the bridge before continuing their journey. According to some accounts, on the night of the accident a brilliant light was seen to rise from the canal water and turn into a human shape. They say the ghost of a lock-keeper, who drowned himself after being sacked for drunkenness, was to blame for the tragedy.

=== 1914: Pork butchers attack ===
During the evening of 15 August 1914, a series of anti-German attacks took place in the city by pro-Allied or British sympathizers – also known commonly as "Redmonites" during World War I. One of the most shocking was George Reitz Pork butchers at Leonard's Corner on the South Circular Road, Portobello. The mob was reportedly led by a newly enlisted soldier. The fullest account of the attack on George Reitz's premises appeared in the Irish Worker on 22 August 1914. Under the heading of "German Baiting: The Police Cowardice" the correspondent described the scene. Having first arrested Reitz himself, the Dublin Metropolitan Police then left his premises unprotected and allowed the mob to proceed unhindered in destroying that shop and robbing its contents. Meanwhile, the DMP themselves stood "idly by" and laughed away the night as they observed the "sport". The Irish Citizen Army feared that the Jewish shops adjacent to Reitz's would be the next targets for the mob.

=== 1916: A terse reply ===
During the Easter Rising in 1916, the Irish Citizen Army sent a group of men to seize a delaying position at Portobello Bridge, to allow fortifications to be constructed in the city centre. They were led by a James Joyce (not the author) who worked in Davy's Bar near the bridge – the bar was to be used as a military outpost. When his unit burst in, Davy, the bar owner, sacked Joyce, giving him one week's notice. Joyce then told Davy he had five minutes to get out.

=== 1916: Murder of Sheehy-Skeffington ===
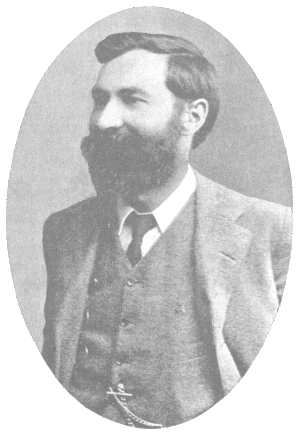
Francis Sheehy-Skeffington

Also during the Easter Rising, members of the British 11th East Surrey Regiment at Portobello Bridge arrested the pacifist Francis Sheehy-Skeffington on 25 April because his name was 'on a list', as he returned to his home in Rathmines from touring the city pasting up leaflets calling people to a meeting to form groups to stop looting of property by slum-dwellers. He was taken to Portobello Barracks, where he was held as an enemy sympathiser. Later that evening, he was taken out as a hostage with a raiding party led by Captain J. C. Bowen-Colthurst of the Royal Irish Rifles, to the home and shop of Alderman James Kelly, at the corner of Camden Street and Harcourt Road (from which the name "Kelly's Corner" derives). Mistaking the Alderman (a conservative) for a different Alderman Kelly, the soldiers arrested two men who were there, gutter journalists Thomas Dickson and Patrick McIntyre, then destroyed the shop with hand grenades. On the way back to Rathmines, Bowen-Colthurst and his party murdered two unarmed civilians, one of them a 17-year-old boy from Mount Pleasant Avenue returning from Rathmines church.

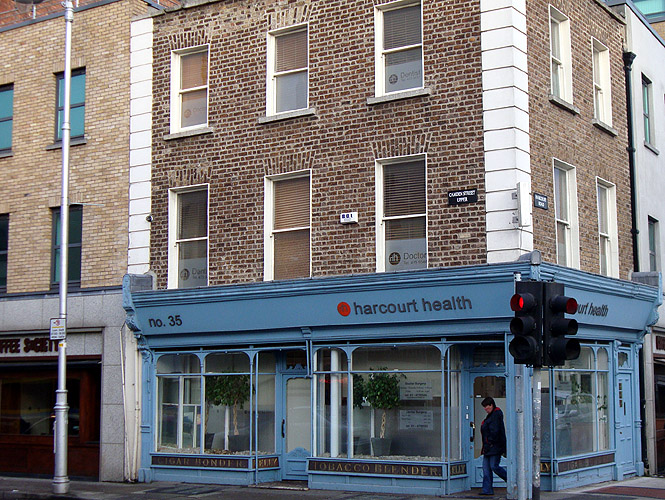
The former Kelly's tobacconist at Kelly's Corner, where Sheehy-Skeffington was taken (35 Camden Street Upper, Saint Kevin's)

The following morning Bowen-Colthurst – an Anglo-Irish ultra-loyalist who was a scion of Dripsey Castle in Cork, and a cousin of the writer Elizabeth Bowen, ordered his sergeant to organise a firing squad to shoot dead Sheehy-Skeffington and the two pro-British journalists Dickson (a disabled Scotsman) and McIntyre. The three were shot in the back as they walked towards a wall in the barracks yard, then buried in shallow graves in the same yard. The British authorities tried to hush up the killings, and offered Bowen-Colthurst command of a regiment in Newry.

Sir Francis Fletcher-Vane, an officer in Portobello Barracks, tried to have Bowen-Colthurst arrested for murder, and was himself then dishonourably discharged from the army (as the Public Records Office nicely put it: "this officer was relegated to unemployment owing to his action in the Skeffington murder case in the Sinn Féin rebellion").

Bowen-Colthurst pleaded insanity at a later investigation and was sent to the mental health facility at Holloway (HM Prison), from where he was quietly released 18 months later. He then emigrated to Canada, where he lived for the rest of his life.

=== 1920: Dead and wounded after riot in Richmond Street ===
On 22 March 1920, an incident, typical of the time, occurred in the area. A large group of British soldiers of the Royal Berkshire Regiment, were returning, singing, to Portobello Barracks after a night out on the town. They started jostling pedestrians in Grafton Street and hissed the Sinn Féin bank in Harcourt Street. At Kelly's Corner, a crowd gathered and attacked them with stones. By the time they reached Lennox Street gunfire had broken out, one soldier being shot in the chest. A running fight along the street developed until armed reinforcements arrived from the barracks. Gunfire broke out between the two sides, and the soldiers forced the crowd back towards Camden Street, firing at them when they did not obey the command to disperse. A van driver and a female domestic were killed, and many were injured.

=== 1920: Shooting of Harry Kells ===
On 15 April 1920 parts of Portobello, including the "Jewish quarters", were subject to the largest raid ever carried out by British troops in Dublin. This was due to the shooting on the previous day of Detective Constable Harry Kells, of the DMP G Division, in Camden St. He was rushed to the Meath Hospital where he died. Harry Kells lived at 7 Pleasants St. and had been carrying out identity parades among the many republican inmates in Mountjoy Prison. Two of those sought were Sinn Féin members Michael and William Kavanagh who lived at 5 Pleasants St., who had previously been "fingered" by Kells, and it was thought they would seek refuge among friends in the neighbourhood. Over 100 people were arrested that day.

=== 1922: Trial of Erskine Childers, Portobello Barracks ===
In November 1922 Erskine Childers was arrested by Irish Free State troops, and he was transferred from a Wicklow Jail to Portobello Barracks in Dublin where he was brutally tortured. On 17 November, he was Court Martialled on a charge of possession of a revolver given to him by Michael Collins, he had since they were both on the same side, prior to the Irish Civil War. He was consequently sentenced to death at Beggars Bush. His execution brought widespread condemnation at home and abroad, it was the result of a draconian emergency act introduced by the Irish Free State government, the death sentence for anyone caught armed without authorization.

=== 1923: Stamer Street Shooting ===
On the night of 14 November 1923, two Jewish men were shot, one of whom Emmanuel Kahn, 24, of Lennox Street died, at the corner of Stamer St./Lennox St. They were returning home from the Jewish Social Club, which was located at 3 Harrington St. The shooting followed an altercation on Stamer St. with officers of the Irish National Army, who had been on their way by taxi from Griffith Barracks to Beggar's Bush Barracks. Ralph Laffan, the taxi driver that night, was charged with the murder, but fled to Mexico to join his brother Fred, who had also been involved that night. He claimed he was mistaken for his brother and was later found not guilty. The apparently motiveless murders remained a mystery until files released in 2007 pointed to Commandant James Patrick Conroy, who harboured a personal vendetta against Jews, as the main instigator. He resigned from the army shortly after the shooting and emigrated.

=== 1966: Nelson's head goes missing from a Clanbrassil Street shed ===
In 1966 a group of students from National College of Art and Design stole the head of lord Nelson's Pillar, which had been blown up by Irish nationalists in March 1966. The head had been stored in a shed off Clanbrassil Street by Dublin City Corporation. The students broke into the shed, put the head in the back of a hatchback and made off with it. The head later appeared in numerous locations most notably the set of a Dubliners concert and also in a London antique shop close to Trafalgar Square where the other pillar is located.

== Literary references ==
"I saw him a few times in the Bleeding Horse in Camden street with Boylan, the billsticker." Ulysses, Chapter 16, Eumaeus episode, James Joyce.

A story by Brian J. Showers called "Favourite No. 7 Omnibus", which can be found in the collection The Bleeding Horse and Other Ghost Stories, is a fictionalisation of an accident on the bridge between Portobello and Rathmines where a number of passengers on a Number 7 omnibus drowned in the Grand Canal. According to another story in the book, the Bleeding Horse pub is haunted by a spectral horse that died in the Battle of Rathmines. The story "Quis Separabit" is about the former Blackberry Fair in Rathmines, which is said to be haunted by the notorious Blackberry Man. The stories in Showers' collection, while drawing on facts from the histories of both Portobello and Rathmines, are largely works of fiction.

== See also ==
- Rathmines
- Harold's Cross
- Clanbrassil Street
- Dolphin's Barn
- History of the Jews in Ireland
