= New Bride Street =

Street in Dublin, Ireland

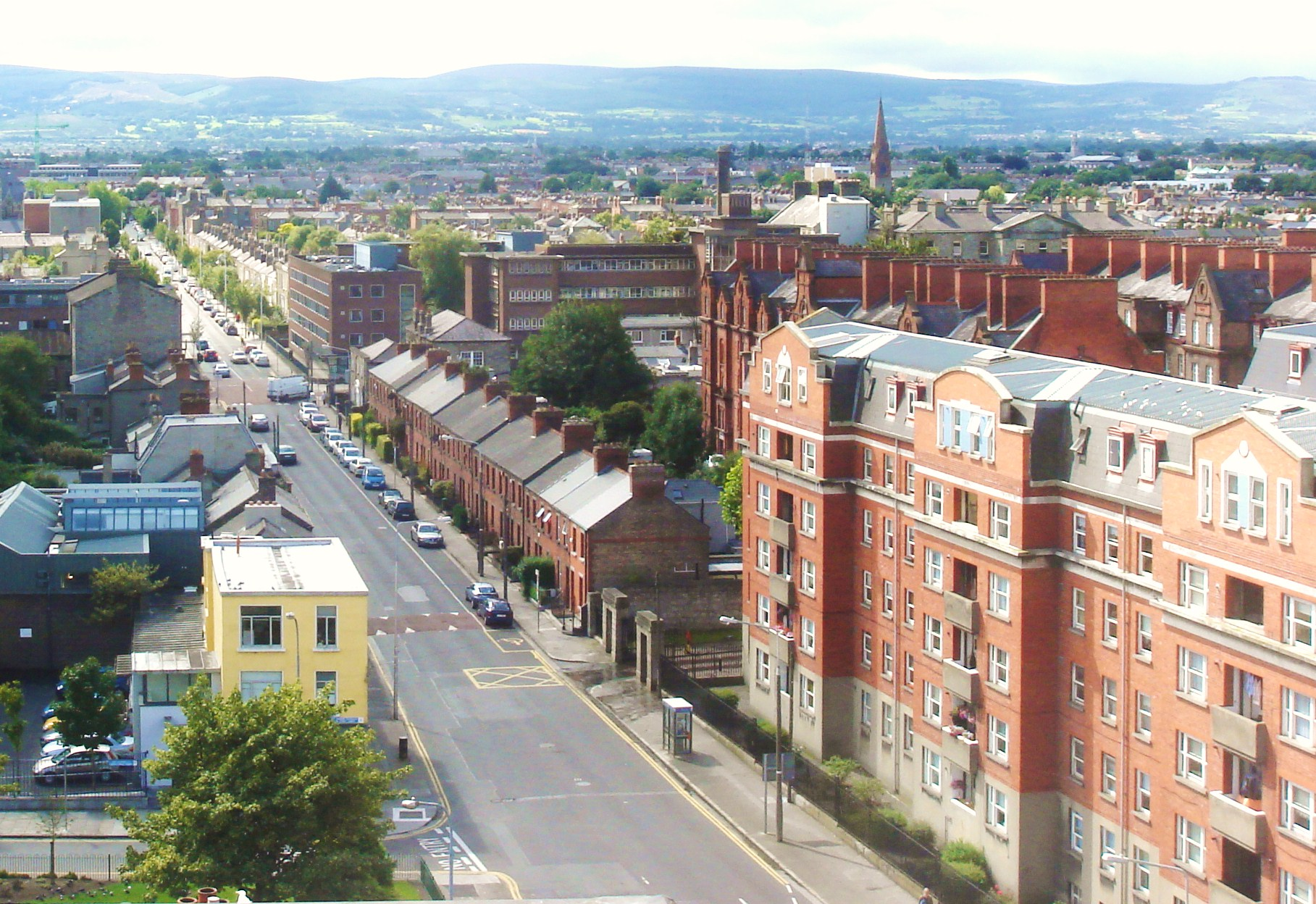
- View of New Bride Street facing south. The yellow building is public clinic of the National Optometry Centre of Dublin Institute of Technology. Taken from the roof-top of the National Archives of Ireland building on Bride Street.

- Location within Central Dublin
- Native name: Sráid Bhríde Nua (Irish)
- Former names: Bridget Street, Bride Street
- Namesake: Bride Street, in turn named after a church dedicated to Brigit of Kildare
- Length: 215 m (705 ft)
- Width: 14.5 metres (48 ft)
- Location: Dublin, Ireland
- Postal code: D08
- Coordinates: 53.337208°N 6.269100°W
- north end: Kevin Street, Bride Street
- south end: Heytesbury Street, Camden Row, Long Lane

Other
- Known for: Dublin Institute of Technology

New Bride Street (Irish: Sráid Bhríde Nua) is a street in the Dublin 8 area of Dublin in Ireland. It runs between Kevin Street and Heytesbury Street in Dublin's south inner city.

== History ==
New Bride Street gets its name from the earlier Bride Street, which was named after a church dedicated to Brigit of Kildare built by the Irish prior to the Norman conquest; the medieval church was replaced by a new St Bridget's (St Bride's) in 1684. By 1757 Rocque's Map shows that Bride Street had been extended and renamed Bridget Street. Wilson’s Directory Map of 1848 shows the development of the then-unnamed New Bride Street from Kevin Street to Long Lane. By 1847 the street had been named New Bride Street and was extended up to the junction with Pleasants Street. Between 1894 and 1901, houses were built from a charitable trust of Edward Cecil Guinness for the labouring poor - three parallel ranges of mostly one and two-room flats with narrow courts between. The 1936 Ordnance Survey map shows the street as it is today ending at the Camden row junction. The street was developed by the 1860s.

The Dublin Conservative Club operated from a building on the corner of New Bride Street and Camden Row when it closed in 2024.

== New Bride Street today ==
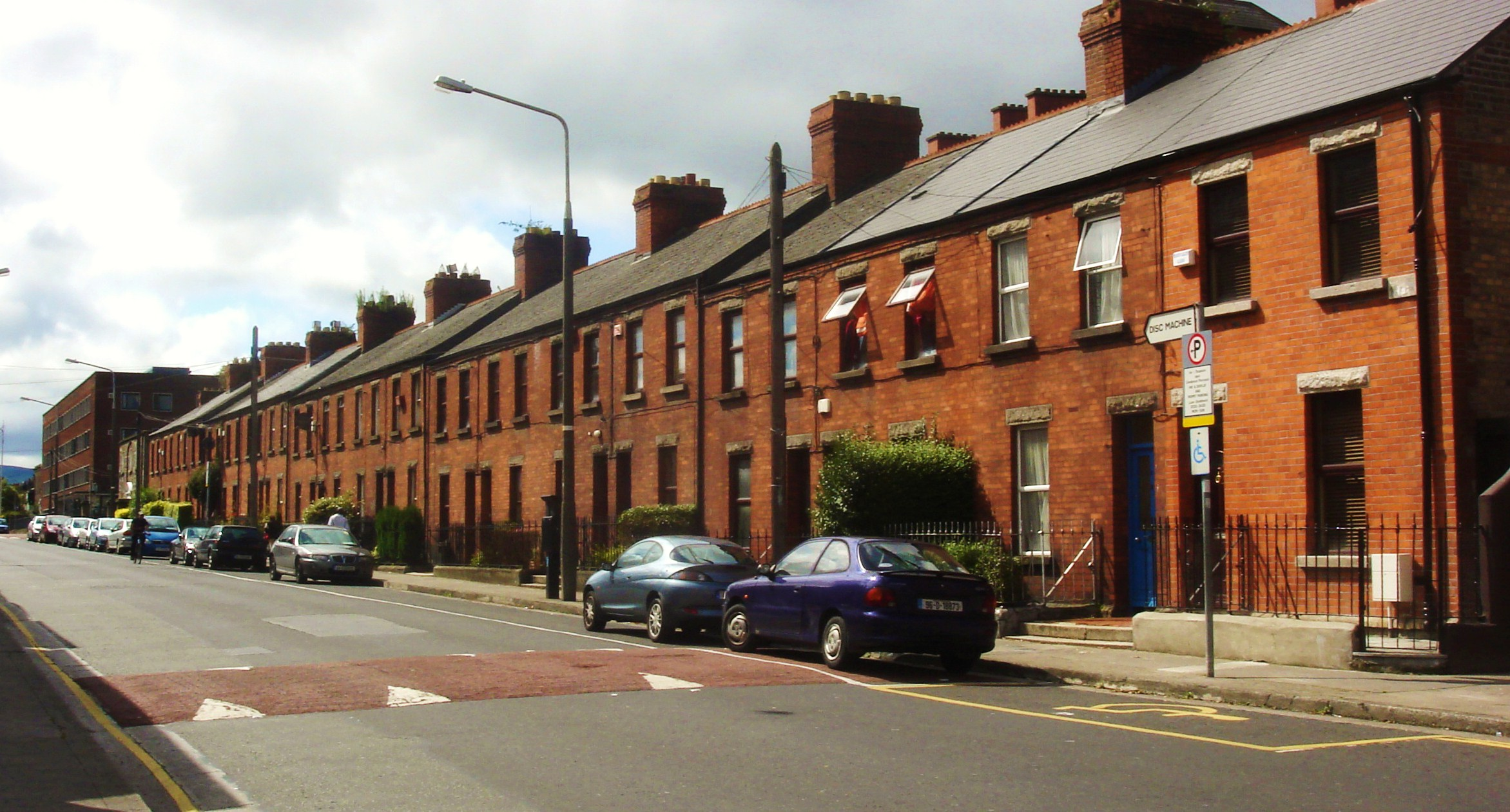
St. Kevin's terrace on New Bride Street

New Bride Street is a short street with an average width of 14 metres and runs in a north/south direction as a continuation of Bride Street between Kevin Street to the south and Heytesbury Street to the north, largely residential with different house types dating from the 1860s mainly the east side and the 1910s mainly on the west side. Some of the first houses built on the road are a small terrace of four houses on the east side, somewhat around the middle of the street and built in the villa style of the time, that being single story over basement. They were built using stone for the basement level and a Dolphins barn brick for the upper level. Sadly, unsympathetic renovations have taken place along the street, replacement PVC doors and windows, adjustments to window shape, and brickwork rendered over, have affected the uniformity of the terrace. Dublin Institute of Technology occupies the lower half of this side of the street with the National Optometry Centre.

Opposite these are the two-story red brick terrace houses built around 1910 and feature granite windows and door lintels. At the Kevin Street end sits the Iveagh Flats, built in the same red brick as the rest of the east side and as such complements the east side streetscape. Built by the Guinness Trust, it began in 1894 and was finished in 1901. Designed by London architects Joseph and Smithem with Kaye Parry and Ross. There has since been a 21st-century addition to the original design, that being an additional story in a mansard style. At the Heytesbury Street end lies two stone buildings, one on both the east and west sides. Formally schools, they are currently used as offices.

== Streetscape ==
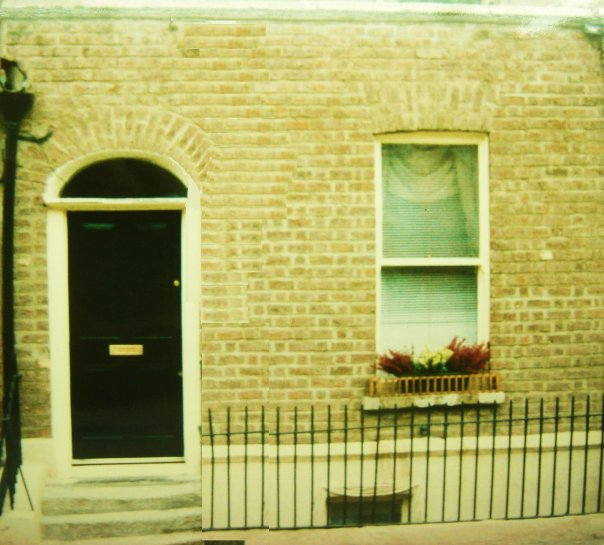
House on New Bride Street

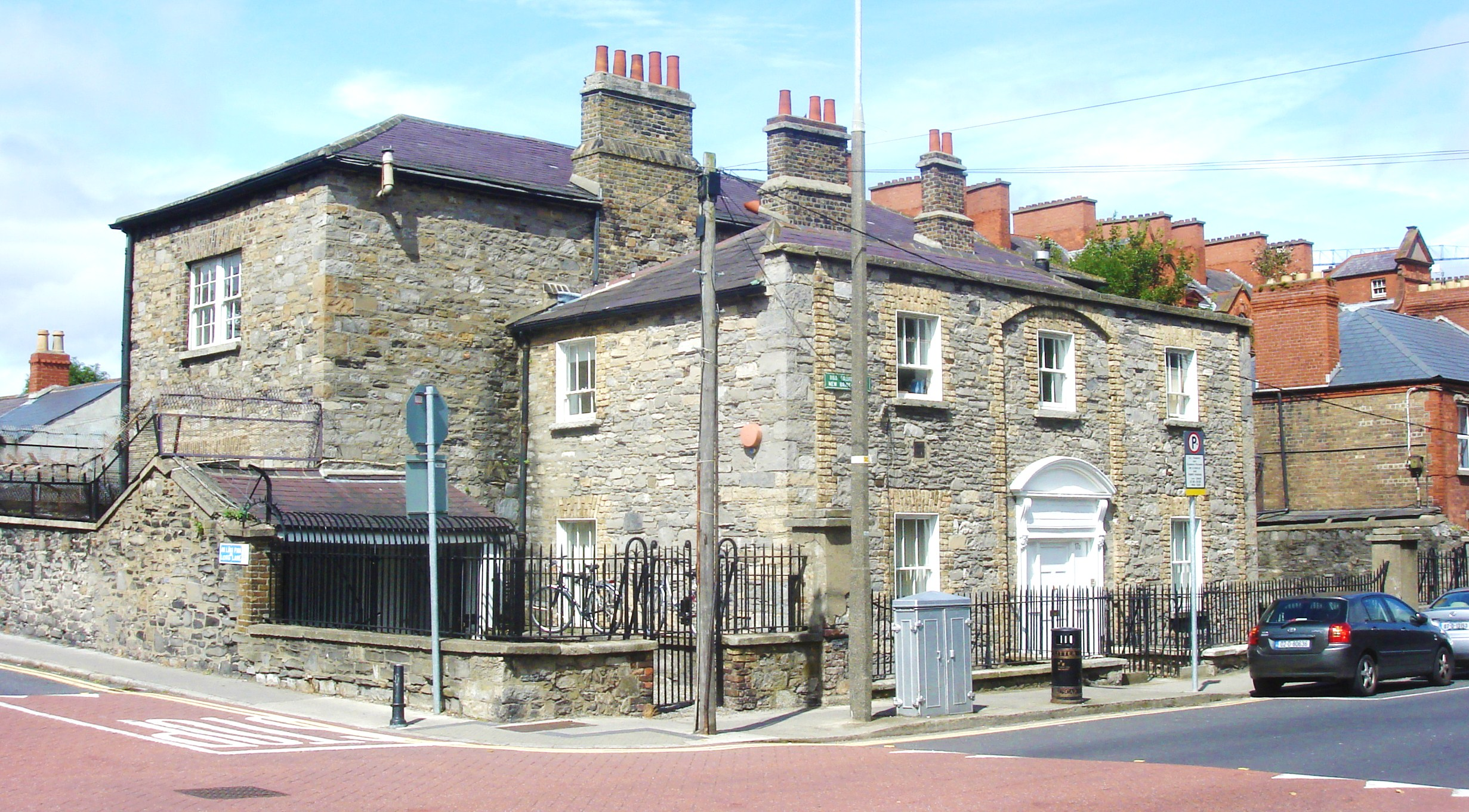
West side corner of New Bride Street - at the junction with Long Lane

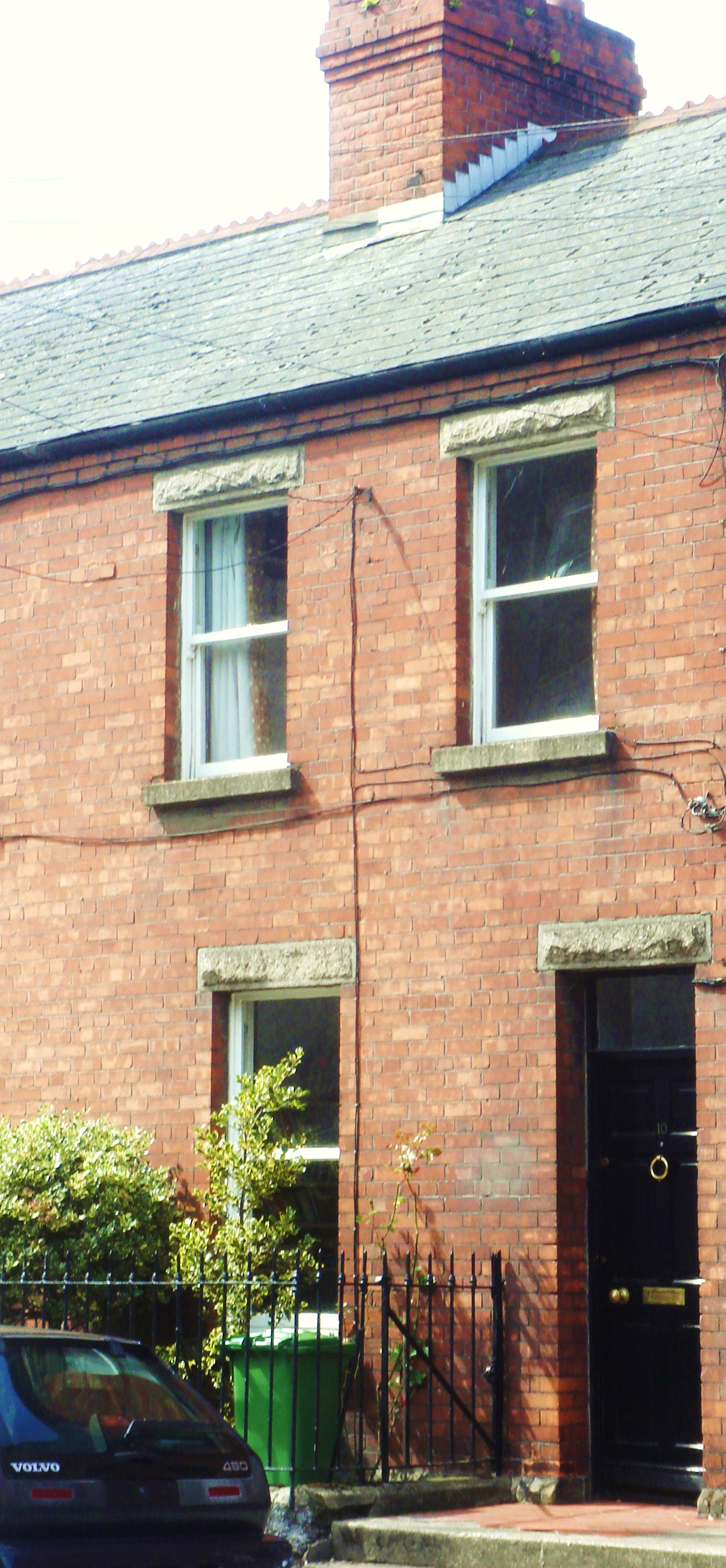
House featuring original sash windows and granite lintels
