= Irish Jewish Museum =

Jewish museum and former synagogue in Dublin, Ireland

- Músaem Giúdach na hÉireann
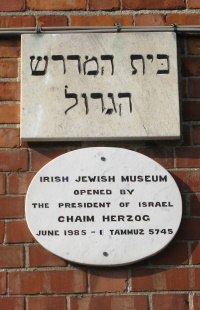
- Wall plaques at the Irish Jewish Museum. The inscription was intended to read as בּית המדרש הגדול (Bet HaMidrash HaGadol), Hebrew for "Great House of Learning"

- Location within Dublin
- Established: 20 June 1985
- Location: 3 Walworth Road, Portobello, Dublin, Ireland
- Coordinates: 53.3307°N 6.2696°W
- Type: Jewish museum
- Public transit access: Harcourt Luas stop (Green Line); South Circular Road (Victoria St) bus stop
- Website: jewishmuseum.ie/irish-jewish-history/museum/

The Irish Jewish Museum (Irish: Músaem Giúdach na hÉireann) is a small museum located in the once highly Jewish-populated area of Portobello, around the South Circular Road, Dublin, dedicated to the history of the Irish Jewish community. It includes a former synagogue with ritual fittings.

The museum was opened in June 1985 by Chaim Herzog who was then president of Israel and was born in Ireland. The museum is in a former synagogue built in 1917 in two adjoining terraced houses on Walworth Road, off the South Circular Road. The surrounding area, Portobello, was previously a Jewish area, however the large scale emigration that affected Ireland in the 1950s had a particularly strong effect on the Jewish population; during this period there was a migration to the suburbs and Dublin's main synagogue shifted to Terenure. The synagogue is preserved, there are artifacts on display, and the museum houses genealogical records. Plans for an expansion of the museum have been in progress since 2012.

== History and plans ==
=== Establishment ===
The museum was opened in June 1985 by Irish-born Chaim Herzog, then president of Israel.

=== 2005 attacks ===
In 2005, the museum was sprayed several times with antisemitic slogans. Minister for Foreign Affairs Dermot Ahern visited the museum to express Government support for the museum and the Jewish community; Ahern's actions were praised by Israeli Foreign Minister Silvan Shalom. The culprit was identified from CCTV images and arrested. At trial, his lawyers stated that the attacks were a result of ongoing schizophrenia and he was sentenced to six months of probation. Raphael Siev, curator of the museum, said the attacks had caused "great terror" and "great upset" but the trial judge prevented him from continuing, citing the uncertain legal status of victim impact statements in cases of this sort.

=== Development plans ===
In 2012, the museum began a fundraising campaign to expand and develop the site, under the auspices of Ireland's Office of Public Works. The plans included demolition of the original synagogue at numbers 3 and 4 Walworth Road, as well as the demolition of three houses at numbers 5 to 7 Walworth Road, a 6-metre basement excavation, and construction of a facsimile 19th century facade. Taoiseach Enda Kenny supported the plan, describing it as an "exciting project ... for the regeneration of the city". The plans were criticised by some local residents, councillors, and architects, and 25 formal objections were submitted, citing destruction of the original synagogue, facadism and lack of public engagement as the main reasons for opposition. In December 2013, the planning appeals board, An Bord Pleanála, voted 5 to 3 in favour of the plan, granting planning permission with a number of conditions. Although approved, and supported by the Taoiseach, the large-scale expansion did not materialise.

It was later reported by The Irish Times that the permission lapsed after a few years had passed with no development, leaving the site as it was, with ongoing maintenance and limited use of the museum buildings. More recent proposals have centered around refurbishing and extending the existing museum while retaining the historic synagogue. A neighbouring house has been bought and vested in the museum. Plans include the creation of a proper archive area and a library / resource centre.

== Contents and displays ==
The museum contains a substantial collection of memorabilia relating to the Irish Jewish communities and their various associations and contributions to present day Ireland. The material relates to the last 150 years and is associated with the communities of Dublin, Belfast, Cork, Derry, Drogheda, Limerick and Waterford.

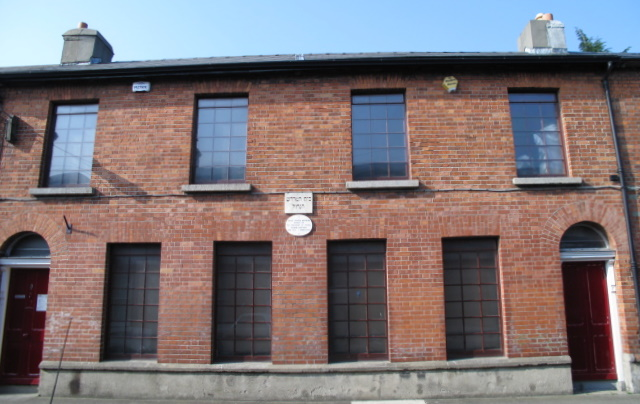
Street view of the Irish Jewish Museum

The museum is divided into several distinct areas. In the entrance area and corridors there is a display of photographs, including of past rabbis, paintings, certificates, testimonials and other documents. There are also illustrations relating to Jewish characters in Joyce's novel, Ulysses, including its hero, Leopold Bloom.

The ground floor contains a general display relating to the commercial and social life of the Jewish community. A special feature adjoining the area is the kitchen depicting a typical Sabbath/Festival meal setting in a Jewish home in the late 19th/early 20th century in the neighbourhood.

Upstairs, the original synagogue, with all its ritual fittings, is on view; there is also the Harold Smerling gallery containing Jewish religious objects, including Torahs brought from other communities.

== See also ==
- History of the Jews in Ireland
- The Jewish Representative Council of Ireland
