= Clanbrassil Street =

Street in Dublin, Ireland

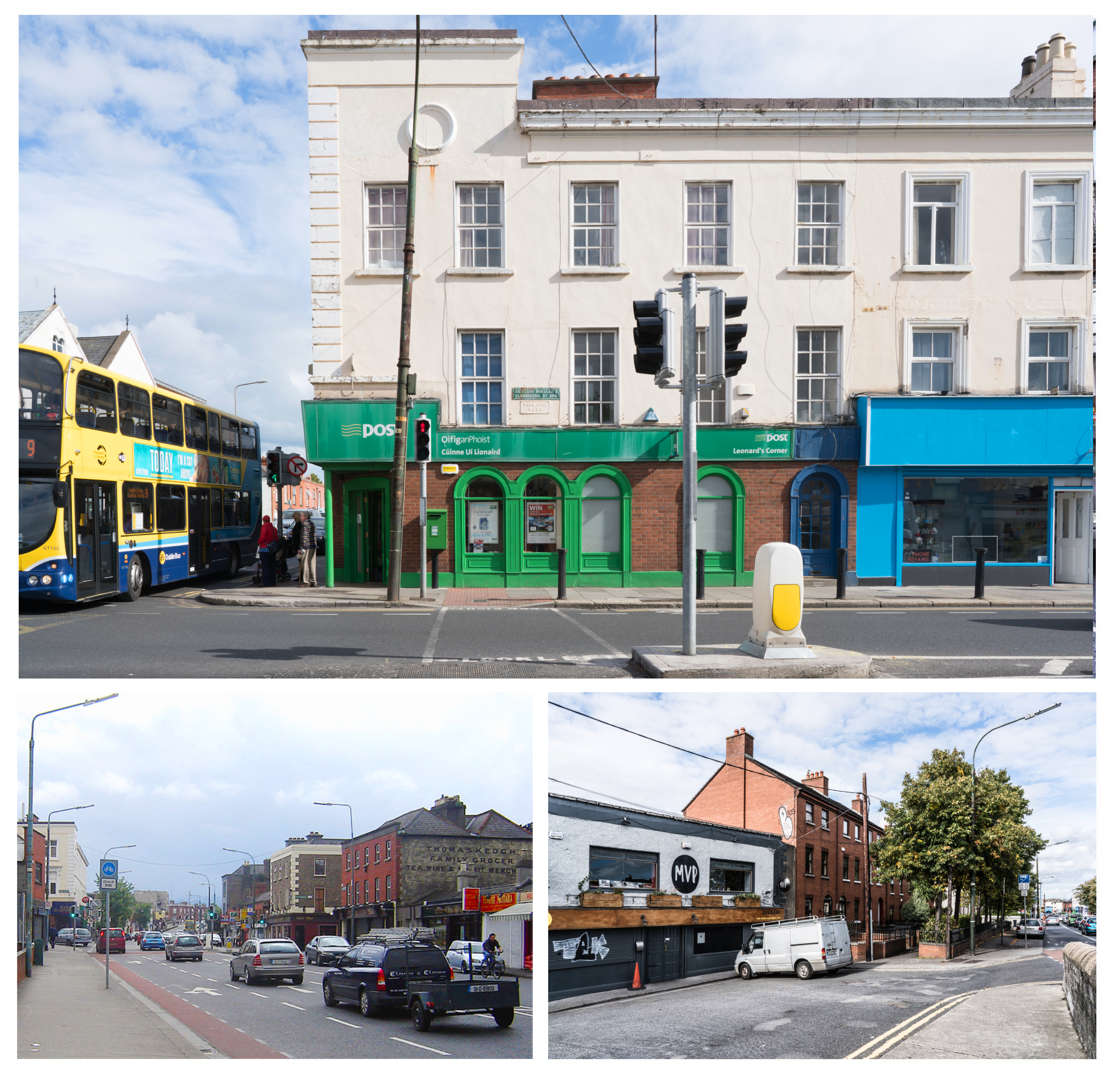
- Clockwise from top: Leonard's Corner post office; a bar on Clanbrassil Street; Upper Clanbrassil Street looking towards Robert Emmet Bridge

- Location within Central Dublin
- Native name: Sráid Chlann Bhreasail (Irish)
- Namesake: James Hamilton, 2nd Earl of Clanbrassil
- Length: 750 m (2,460 ft)
- Width: 23 metres (75 ft)
- Location: Dublin, Ireland
- Postal code: D08
- Coordinates: 53°19′56″N 6°16′31″W
- north end: New Street
- south end: Parnell Road, Grove Road, Harold's Cross Road

Other
- Known for: restaurants

Clanbrassil Street (/klænˈbræsɪl/; Irish: Sráid Chlann Bhreasail) is a street in Dublin south of the city centre. It runs from Robert Emmet Bridge on the Grand Canal to New Street. It is served by several bus routes. It is divided into Clanbrassil Street Upper (south end) and Clanbrassil Street Lower (north end).

It is named after The 2nd Earl of Clanbrassil, an Ulster-Scots nobleman. Clanbrassil (from Irish Clann Bhreasail, meaning 'clan of Breasal') was the name of a Gaelic territory in what is now northern County Armagh.

== History ==
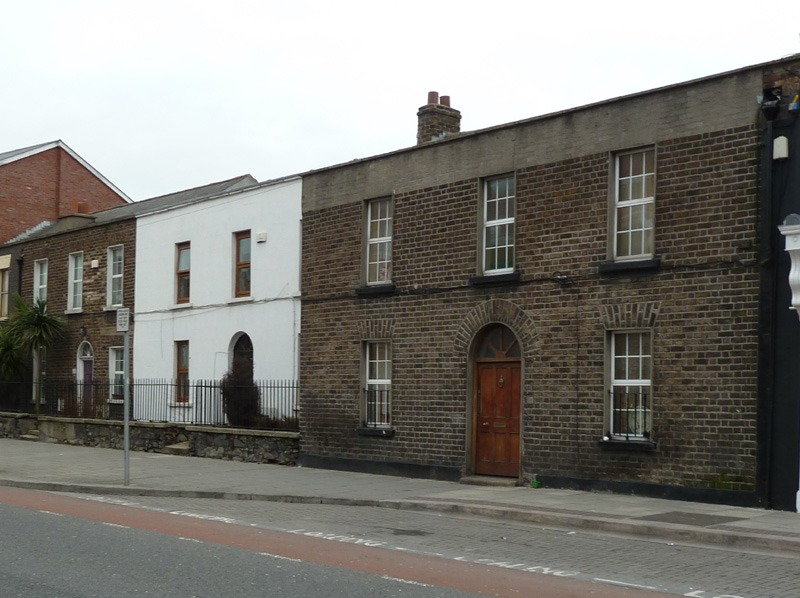
19th-century houses on the east side of Lower Clanbrassil Street

From earliest times the street formed part of the Slíghe Chualann, which ran south from the settlement at Áth Cliath via the New Street gate. It took its name from Cualu, the district in which Dublin was situated and which lay between the mouths of the Liffey and the Avoca (in County Wicklow).

The street is noted as an extension of New Street on John Rocque's map of Dublin of 1756.

By around 1790-96, a new bridge had been built across the Grand Canal at the site of current day Robert Emmet Bridge as part of the circle line of the canal that was then under construction. It was later replaced in 1935-36 with the current bridge.

By around 1820 the modern street form had begun to develop as a middle class residential area out of the city proper with more modern later Georgian houses.

In 1868, a new street was opened to connect Harold's Cross with Lower Clanbrassil Street. The Lord Mayor, the Aldermen and Frederick Stokes, who had purchased the land and led the project, attended the opening. The street was to be called Kingsland Street, but that name was never used and it became Upper Clanbrassil Street.

Between 1886 and 1892, 128 houses were built off Clanbrassil Street (on Daniel Street and Harty Place) by the Dublin Artisans Dwelling Company for the industrial and working classes.

=== Jewish community ===
Lower Clanbrassil Street was known as part of Little Jerusalem because in the first half of the 20th century it was at the heart of the Jewish community in Ireland. The first Jews fleeing conditions in Lithuania (then part of the Russian Empire) arrived in the early 1870s and eventually settled off Lower Clanbrassil Street In the following decades many of them settled along the South Circular Road, both sides of Leonard's Corner, and in the side-streets off it.

Notable Jewish retailers which operated on the street included Rubinstein's Kosher Victuallers and Poulterers at 82 Clanbrassil Street Lower and J Goldwater poultry shop at 76 Clanbrassil Street. The last Jewish shop to close was Ehrlich's butchers in 2001.

== Development of the new road ==
In 1953 all residents of Clanbrassil St. received a notice from Dublin Corporation that residences on the west side of the street would have to have 16 feet (4.9 m) removed from the frontage of the properties to make way for a new road. This proposal was constantly changed or deferred, so that in the 1960s and 1970s the street fell into ruin. One by one businesses, public houses and retail outlets closed up or were demolished, and that side of the road became a wasteland. By 1980 the road engineers had increased the amount of space needed to 60 feet (18.3 m), in order to run a 6-lane dual carriageway through the street, past St. Patrick's Cathedral on to Christ Church Cathedral.

After protests and demonstrations by locals and sympathisers against the road, and intervention by the Taoiseach, Charles Haughey, work on the road eventually began in 1989. A 4-lane dual carriageway was constructed, flanked by new houses and apartments. The cost of the road was estimated to be £2 million.

Among the features destroyed by the road construction was the crossing known locally as the "Four Corners of Hell" (the junction of Patrick St., Dean St., New St. and Kevin St.), because there was a public house on each corner; and the well-known hostelry The Bunch of Grapes (formerly Fitzpatrick's, constructed in 1739).

== Literary allusion ==
Leopold Bloom, the fictional Jewish character at the heart of the James Joyce novel Ulysses, lived at "52 Clanbrassil Street"; a plaque commemorating this can be found on the wall of 52 Upper Clanbrassil Street.

== See also ==
- Portobello, Dublin
