= Dublin 8 =

Dublin 8 (D8) Baile Átha Cliath 8 (Irish)
- Postal district
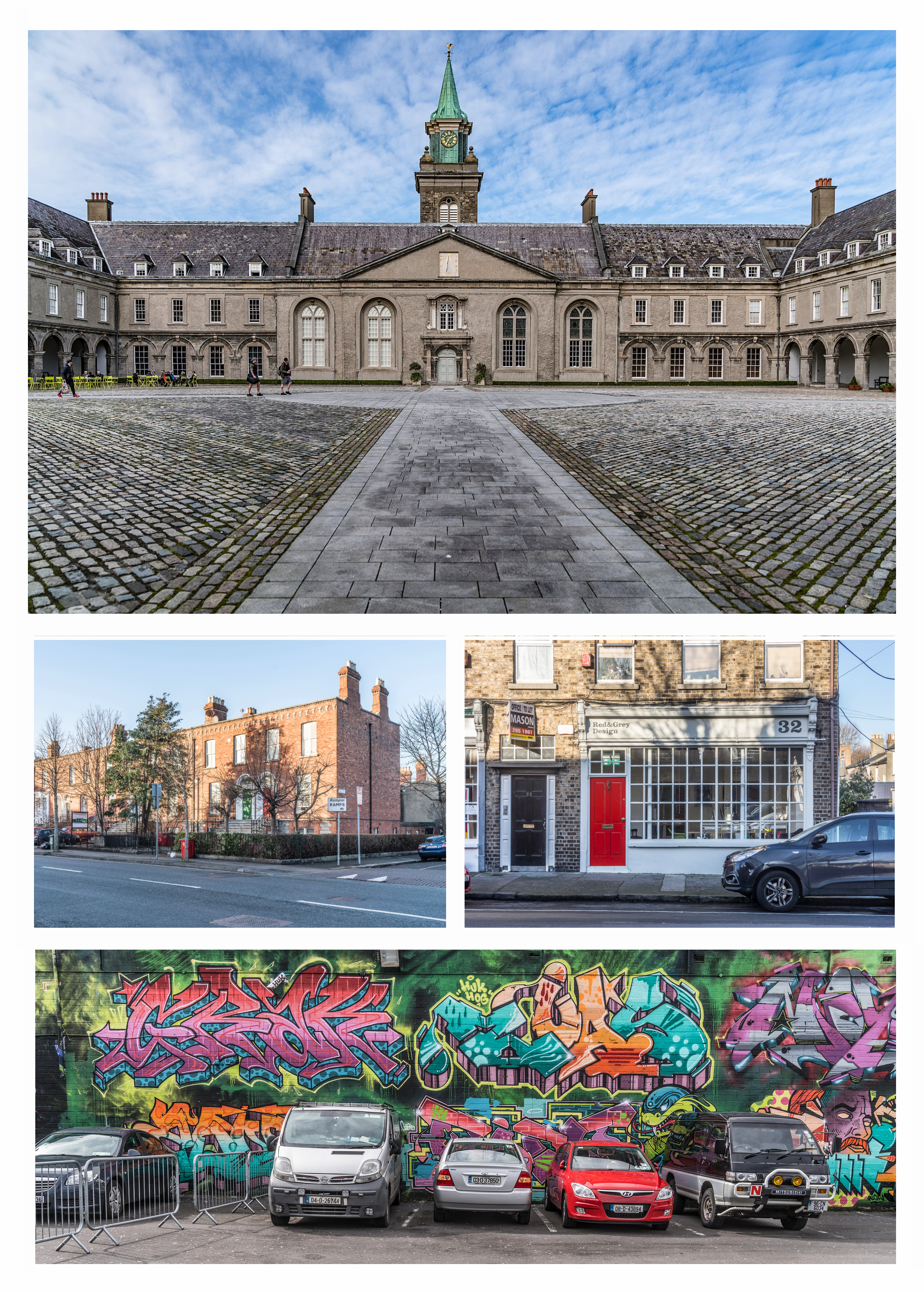
- Clockwise from top: Royal Hospital Kilmainham, a shopfront in Portobello, graffiti near Meath Street, the South Circular Road
- Country: Ireland
- Province: Leinster
- Local authority: Dublin City Council
- Dáil constituencies: Dublin Bay South; Dublin South-Central; Dublin West
- EP constituency: Dublin
- Postal district(s): D8/D08
- Dialing code: 01, +353 1

Dublin 8, also rendered as D8 and D08, is a postal district in Dublin. Dublin 8 is one of only two postal districts to span the River Liffey, the other being Dublin 20 immediately to the west. While the majority of the district's built up areas are on the southside, it also includes northside areas such as the vast Phoenix Park. A 2018 article in The Irish Times noted that, while the area was historically known for the manufacture of silk and wool, Dublin 8's "streets, alleys and quaysides are [now] replete with hipster cafes, cocktail bars and family-friendly restaurants".

== Area profile ==
Dublin 8 was named one of the "coolest neighbourhoods" in the world by Time Out in 2021. Forecasting by Knight Frank, which put the area on a so-called global hot list, has indicated the district could face property price growth of up to 20% in the coming years. However, further research has shown that rapid, large-scale transformation and gentrification in the postal code has left some of its residents feeling powerless and voiceless.

On Heytesbury Street, the area is home to the largest collection of intact one floor over basement houses in the city. This is a style of home unique to Ireland. The Victorian structures were built for the lower middle classes from the 1830s onwards, as the city's population increased despite the Great Famine.

== Notable places ==
Dublin 8 includes Dolphin's Barn, Inchicore, Islandbridge, Kilmainham, Merchants Quay, Portobello, South Circular Road, the Phoenix Park and the Liberties. Notable buildings include Christ Church Cathedral and St. Patrick's Cathedral.

== Usage in Dublin addresses ==
The postal district of Dublin 8 is used in conjunction with the seven-digit Eircodes that are unique to each address in the state. For example: For example:

Liberties College  
Bull Alley Street
Dublin 8
D08 A8N0

== Gallery ==
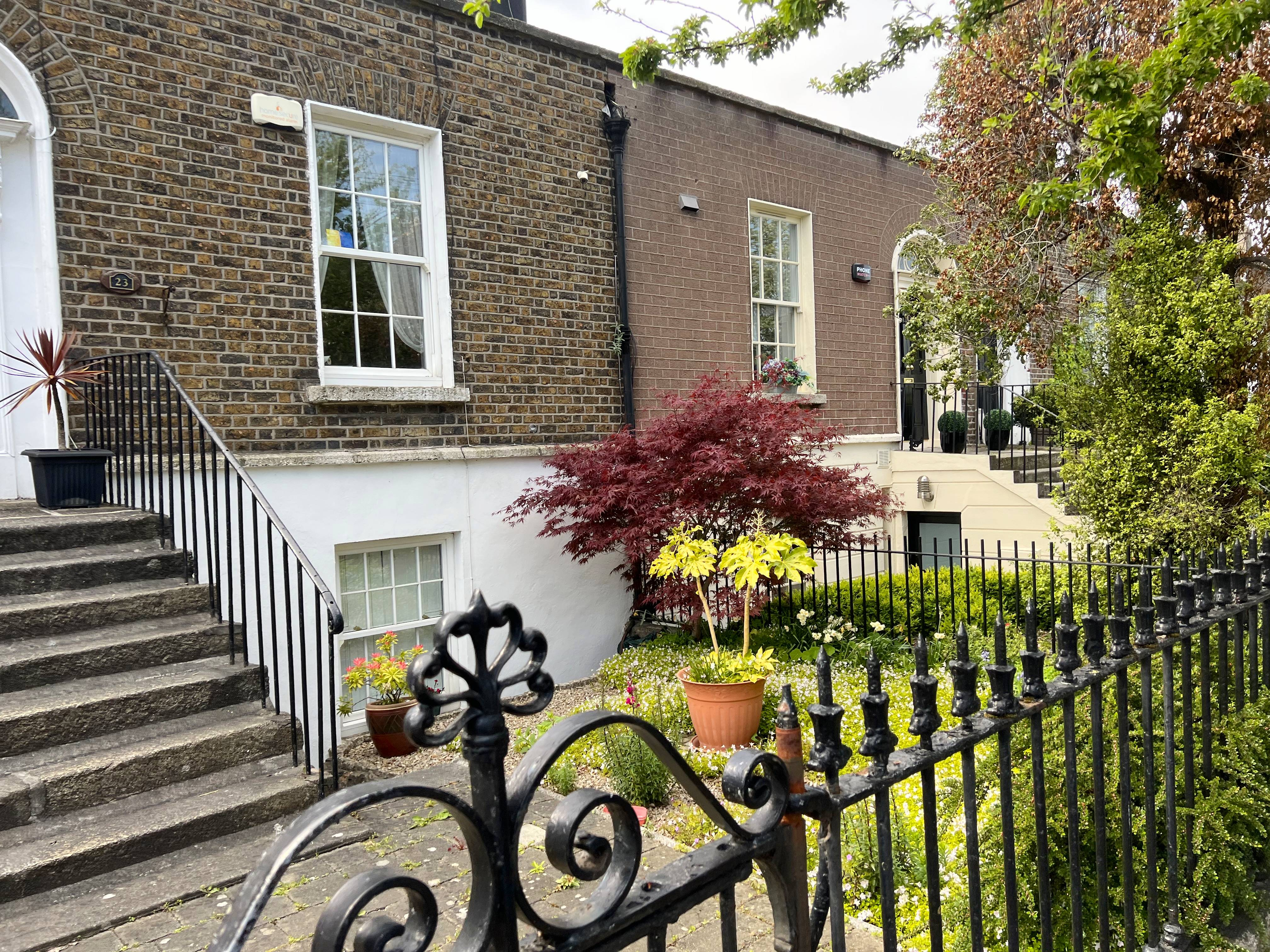
Single floor over basement homes on Heytesburty Street.

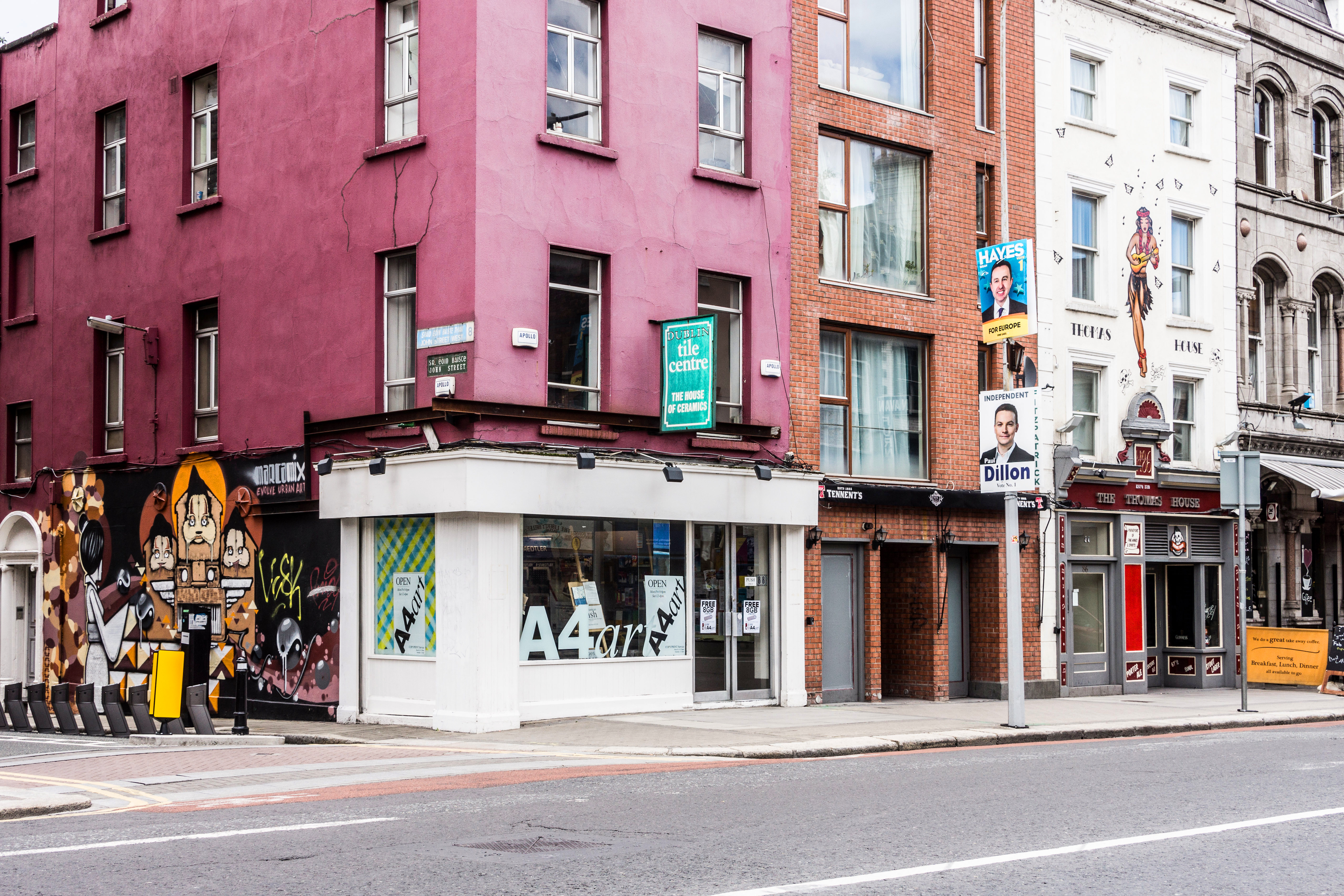
Galleries and bars along Thomas Street.

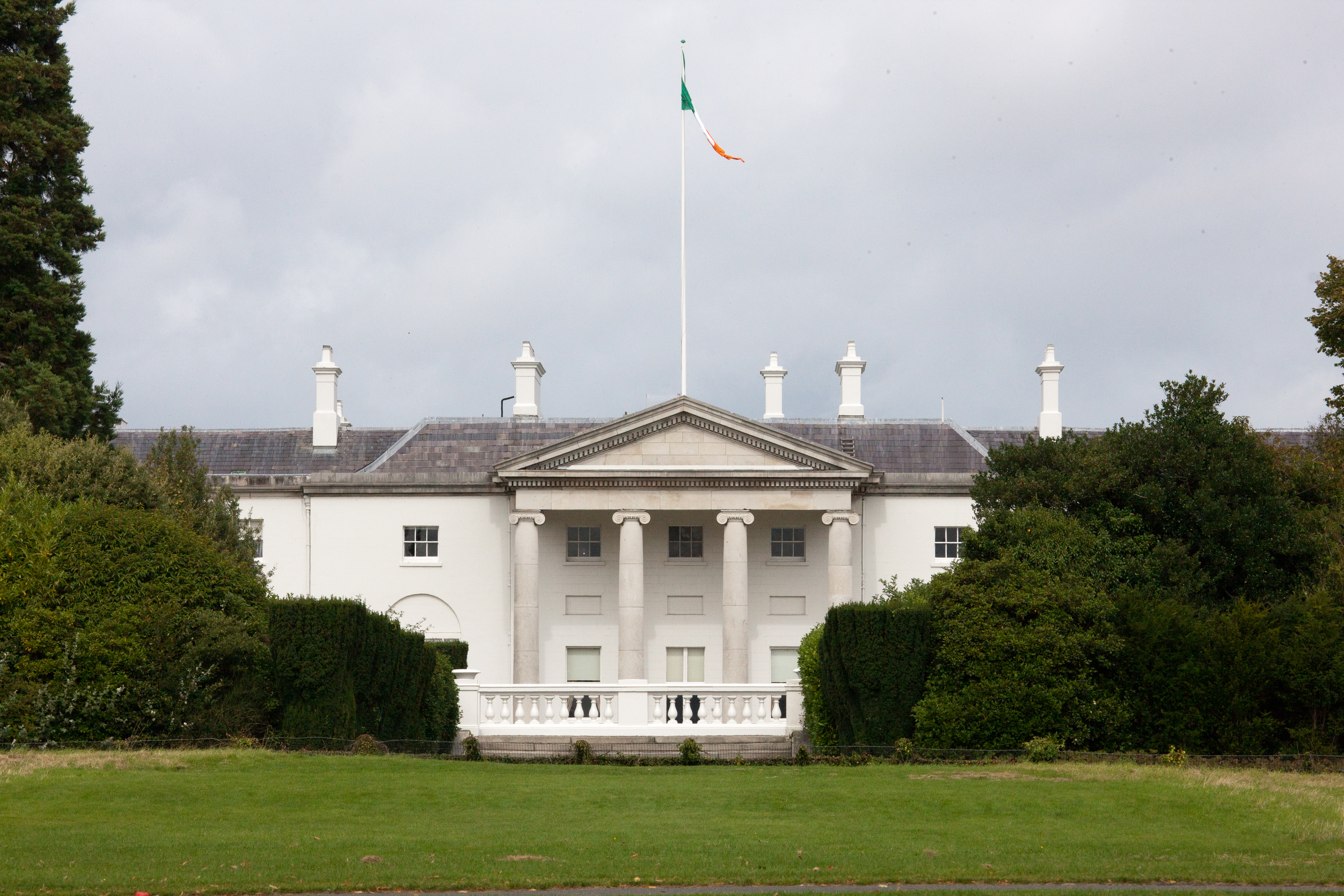
Official residence of the President of Ireland, Phoenix Park.

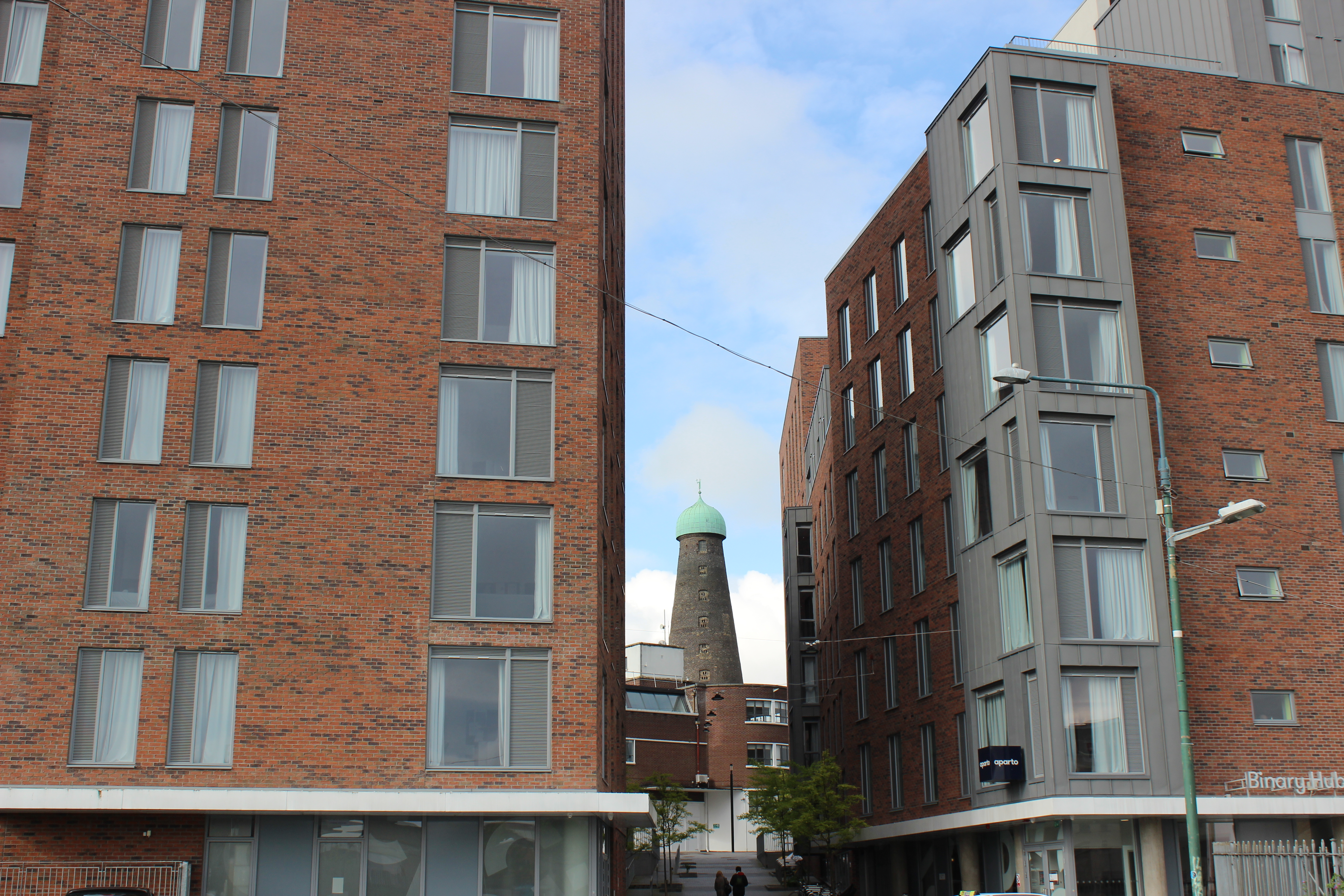
Apartments along Bonham Street.

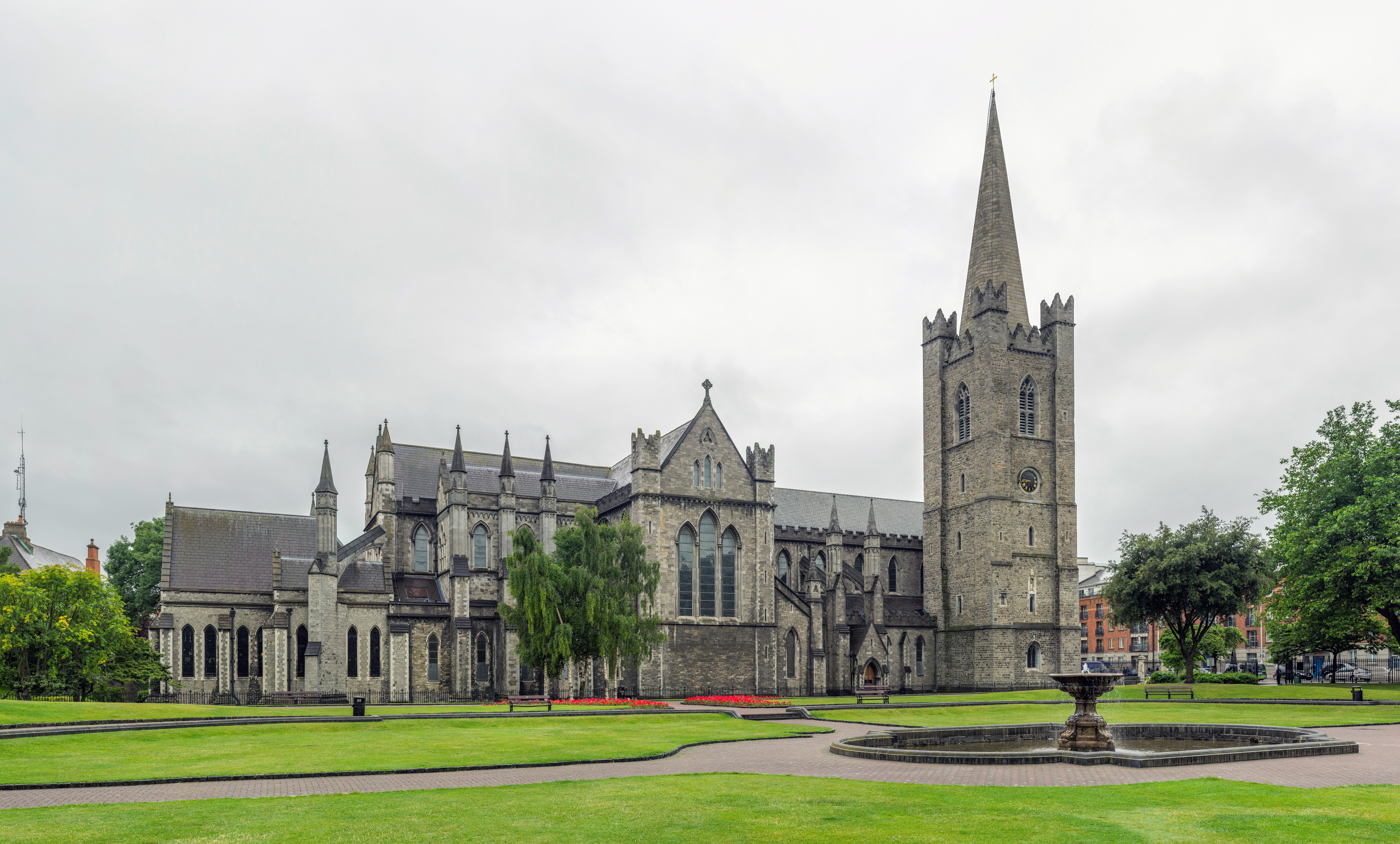
St Patrick's Cathedral

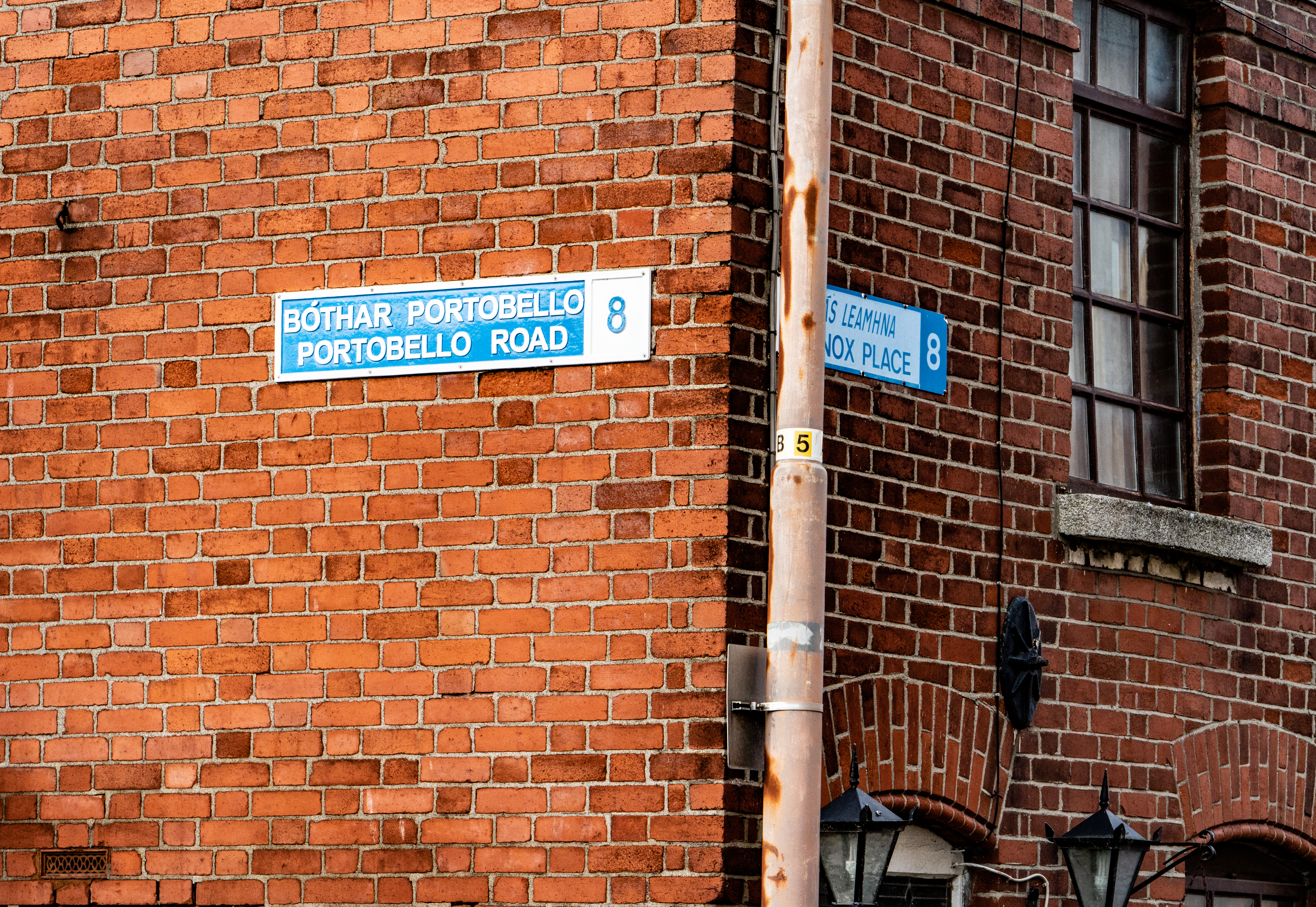
Street signs in Portobello.

== See also ==
- List of Dublin postal districts
- List of Eircode routing areas in Ireland
- List of postal codes
