= Camden Street, Dublin =

Street in Dublin, Ireland

Camden Street
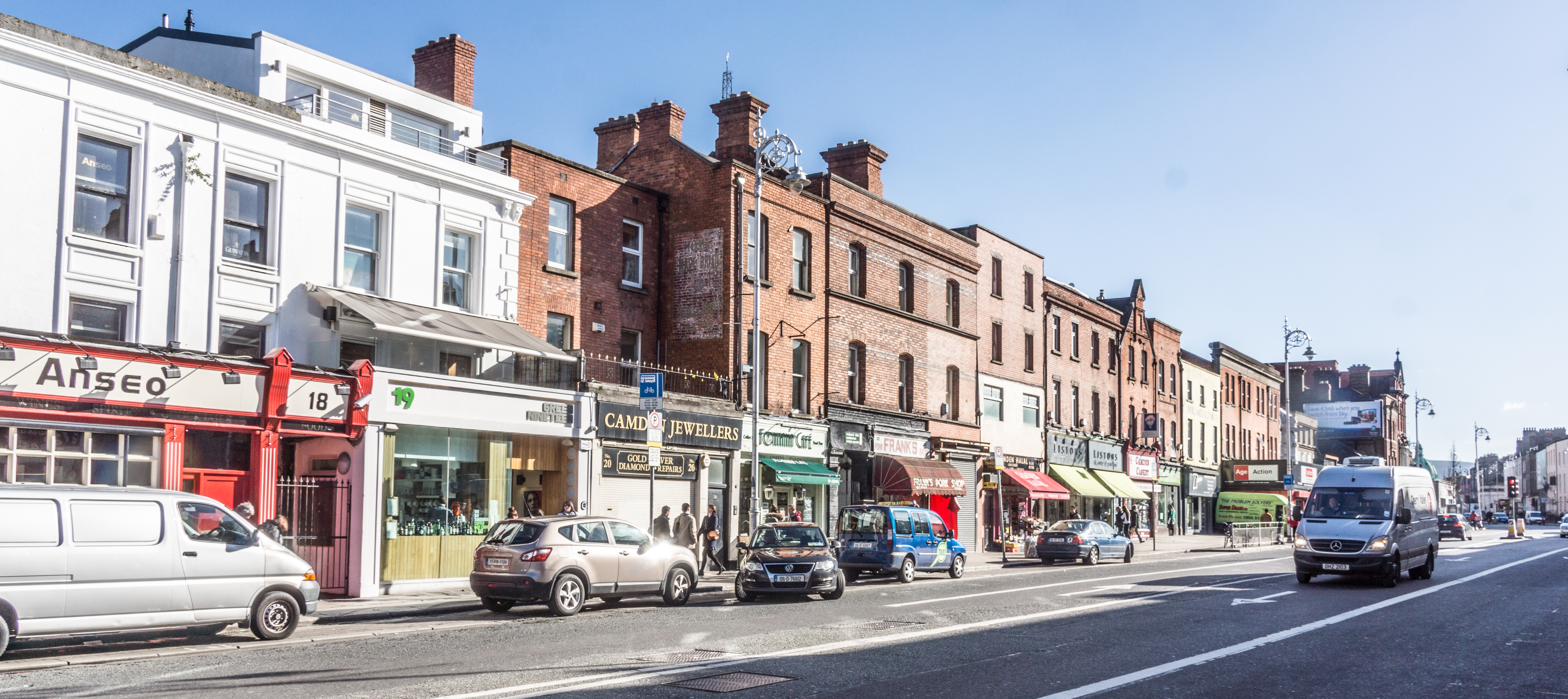
- Camden Street

- Location within Central Dublin
- Native name: Sráid Port Caoimhin or Sráid Camden (Irish)
- Namesake: Charles Pratt, 1st Earl Camden
- Length: 450 m (1,480 ft)
- Width: 17 metres (56 ft)
- Location: Dublin, Ireland
- Postal code: D02
- Coordinates: 53.333915°N 6.265208°W
- north end: Cuffe Street
- south end: Harrington Street, Harcourt Road, Richmond Street South

Construction
- Completion: 1778

Other
- Known for: restaurants and nightclubs

Camden Street (Irish: Sráid Camden) is a street in Dublin 2. It links Ranelagh/Rathmines (Dublin 6) to the southern city centre of Dublin. It is divided into Camden Street Upper (southern end) and Camden Street Lower (northern end).

== History ==
The name is likely derived from the 1st Earl Camden (1714–94). The fact that the street name first appears on maps in 1778 would rule it out as originating from his son, the 1st Marquess Camden (1759-1840), who became Lord Lieutenant of Ireland, as the 2nd Earl Camden, in 1795. An attempt to connect the name to Saint Kevin (Old Irish Cóemgen) is regarded as spurious.

A prominent company located on Upper Camden St for over a century was Earley and Company (1861–1975). They were ecclesiastical furnishings and stained glass manufacturers and retailers. The firm was one of the largest and most prestigious ecclesiastical decorators both in Ireland and Great Britain.

== Architecture ==
An intact Edwardian shop interior existed at number 39, Carvill's Off Licence until the early 21st century. The Bleeding Horse pub is also a notable building, with a public house sitting on the site since 1648. It is mentioned in the work of Sean O'Casey, and both James Clarence Mangan and Joseph Sheridan Le Fanu were patrons.

There were two cinemas on the street: The Camden Cinema and the Theatre De Luxe. The Camden Cinema was located at 55 Upper Camden St., where the headquarters of Concern Worldwide is now located. It closed around 1912. The Theatre De Luxe was opened in 1912 by Maurice Elliman, a Jew who escaped the pogroms in Eastern Europe. The first building was designed by Frederick Hayes, MRIAI, and built by George Squire & Co. It was enlarged and rebuilt in 1920. The exterior was remodelled in Art deco style in 1934. It closed in 1975. The building is now a hotel, Hotel De Luxe, and a night-club.
