= Heytesbury Street =

Street in Dublin, Ireland

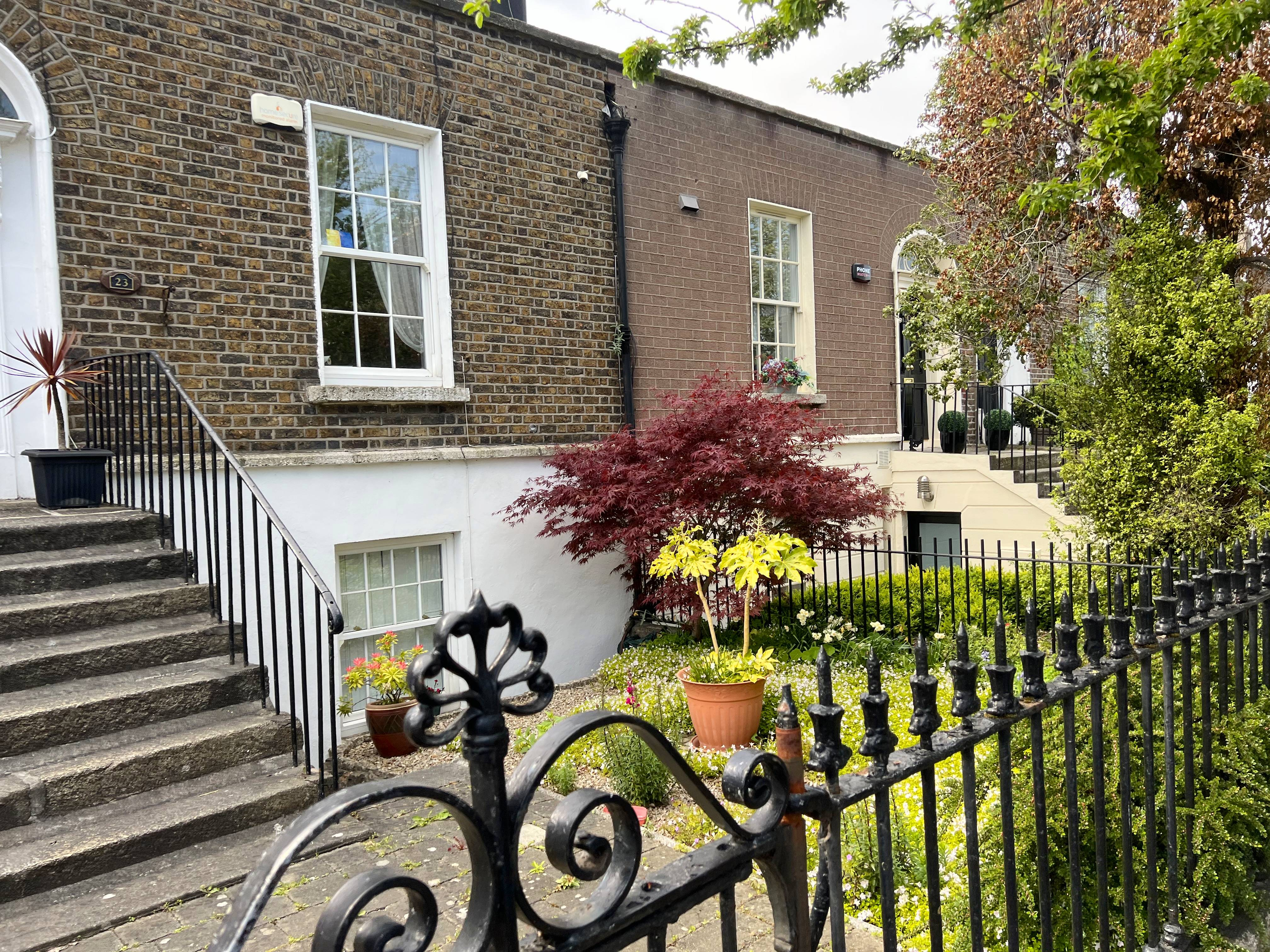
- Heytesbury Street in spring

- Location within Central Dublin
- Native name: Sráid Heytesbury (Irish)
- Namesake: William à Court, 1st Baron Heytesbury
- Length: 407 m (1,335 ft)
- Width: 16 metres (52 ft)
- Location: Dublin, Ireland
- Postal code: D08
- Coordinates: 53°20′00″N 6°16′07″W
- north end: Long Lane, New Bride Street, Camden Row
- south end: South Circular Road, Harrington Street, Stamer Street

Other
- Known for: Synge Street CBS, Meath Hospital

Heytesbury Street (/ˈheɪtsbəriː/; Irish: Sráid Heytesbury) is a tree-lined inner city street north of the South Circular Road, in Portobello, Dublin, Ireland.

== History ==
The street is named after William à Court, 1st Baron Heytesbury (1789–1860), Lord Lieutenant 1844–46. Built and developed as an artery to join Portobello Harbour about 1820, its current layout dates from the mid-19th century.

It is primarily a residential street but also contains a school: Synge Street CBS is officially known as St Paul's Secondary School, Heytesbury Street.

Jonathan Swift had a vegetable garden and a paddock for his horse nearby. The entrance to the Meath Hospital was located on this street. The hospital's foundations were laid by Lord Brabazon in October 1770. The hospital was initially known as The Meath Hospital and County Dublin Infirmary, but was renamed on its move in 1823.

James Clarence Mangan and Brendan Behan were patients in the Meath Hospital and died there. Oliver St John Gogarty (Buck Mulligan in Joyce's Ulysses) was on its staff from 1911 to 1939.

No. 33, Heytesbury Street was the birthplace of Cornelius Ryan, author of The Longest Day, The Last Battle and A Bridge Too Far.

No. 72, Heytesbury Street houses one of Ireland's leading contract bridge clubs, the Civil Service Bridge Club.

== Literary references ==
"There's a bloody big foxy thief beyond by the garrison church at the corner of Chicken lane - old Troy was just giving me a wrinkle about him - lifted any God's quantity of tea and sugar to pay three bob a week said he had a farm in the county Down off a hop-of-my-thumb by the name of Moses Herzog over there near Heytesbury street." Ulysses, Chapter 12, Cyclops episode, James Joyce.

"Of what did bellchime and handtouch and footstep and lonechill remind him? Of companions now in various manners in different places defunct: Percy Apjohn (killed in action, Modder River), Philip Gilligan (phthisis, Jervis Street hospital), Matthew F. Kane (accidental drowning, Dublin Bay), Philip Moisel (pyemia, Heytesbury street), Michael Hart (phthisis, Mater Misericordiae hospital), Patrick Dignam (apoplexy, Sandymount)." Ulysses, Chapter 17, Ithaca episode, James Joyce.

== See also ==
- List of streets and squares in Dublin
