= List of Dublin bridges and tunnels =

This article lists the bridges and tunnels in Dublin and the Greater Dublin Area in Ireland. The bridges are ordered sequentially upstream, from mouth to source. For lists that are not in table format, alternative or historical names are in curved brackets (parentheses) and traversing roads or rails are in square brackets.

== Bridges over the Liffey ==
Bridges over the River Liffey in Greater Dublin, from mouth to source (east to west).

Name	Alternate names	Type	Connections	Build dates	Image
East-Link Bridge	Tom Clarke Bridge	Tolled drawbridge	East Wall Road to Toll Bridge Road and York Road	1984	
Samuel Beckett Bridge		Rotatable road bridge	Guild Street to Sir John Rogerson's Quay	2009	
Seán O'Casey Bridge		Rotatable footbridge	Sir John Rogerson's Quay to North Wall Quay	2005	
Talbot Memorial Bridge		Road bridge	Memorial Road to Moss Street	1978	
Loopline Bridge	Liffey Viaduct	Rail bridge with overhead power supply for the DART	Links suburban and intercity rail lines south of Liffey to those in the north	1891	Detail of the Liffey Viaduct
Butt Bridge	Irish: Droichead na Comhdhála, meaning 'Congress Bridge'	Road bridge	Beresford Place to Tara Street	1932 (Previous structure: 1879)	Butt Bridge with the Liffey Viaduct above it in the background
Rosie Hackett Bridge	Working name: Marlborough Street Public Transport Priority Bridge	Road bridge (public transport only)	Marlborough Street to Hawkins Street	2012–14	Rosie Hackett Bridge under construction
O'Connell Bridge	Carlisle Bridge	Road bridge	O'Connell Street Lower to Westmoreland Street and D'Olier Street	1791 (Original: 1791 Redeveloped: 1879)	O'Connell Bridge viewed from upstream
Liffey Bridge	Ha'penny Bridge, Metal Bridge, Wellington Bridge	Foot bridge	Liffey Street Lower to Merchant's Arch	1816	
Millennium Bridge		Footbridge	Ormonde Quay to Wellington Quay	1999	
Grattan Bridge	Essex Bridge	Road bridge	Capel Street to Parliament Street	1874 (Previous structures: 1676, 1755)	
O'Donovan Rossa Bridge	Richmond Bridge, Ormond Bridge	Road bridge	Chancery Place to Winetavern Street	1816 (Previous structure: 1684)	
Father Mathew Bridge	Whitworth Bridge, Dublin Bridge, Old Bridge	Road bridge	Church Street to Bridge Street Lower	1818 (Previous structures: 1014, 1428)	Father Mathew Bridge
Mellows Bridge	Mellowes Bridge, Queen's Bridge, Queen Maeve Bridge	Road bridge	Queen Street to Bridgefoot Street	1768 (Previous structure: 1683)	
James Joyce Bridge		Road bridge	Blackhall Place to Ushers Island	2003	James Joyce Bridge over the River Liffey
Rory O'More Bridge	Victoria & Albert Bridge, Queen Victoria Bridge	Road bridge	Watling Street to Ellis Street	1859 (Previous structures: 1670, 1704)	
Frank Sherwin Bridge		Road bridge	St. John's Road West and Victoria Quay to Wolfe Tone Quay	1981	
Seán Heuston Bridge	King's Bridge, Sarsfield Bridge	Light rail and footbridge	Heuston Station to Wolfe Tone Quay	1828	
Liffey Railway Bridge		Rail bridge	Heuston Station to Phoenix Park Tunnel	1877	
Islandbridge	Sarah or Sarah's Bridge	Road bridge	South Circular Road to Conyngham Road	1794 (Previous structure: 1577)	
Anna Livia Bridge	Chapelizod Bridge	Road bridge	Lucan Road to Chapelizod Road	1753 (Previous structure: 1660s)	
Farmleigh Bridge		Disused service bridge	Farmleigh House	1850s	
West-Link Bridge		Tolled motorway bridge	M50 motorway	1990	
Lucan Bridge		Road bridge	Lower Lucan Road	1814 (Previous structures: 1200s, 1730s, 1771, 1780s)	

Plan of the bridges and quays in Dublin city from Frank Sherwin Bridge in the west to the East-Link Bridge (aka Tom Clarke Bridge) in the east

Bridges over the River Liffey outside Greater Dublin, from Lucan Bridge upriver to its source in the Wicklow Mountains:

- Sewage treatment works bridge
- Leixlip Bridge [Leixlip Road]
- M4 motorway
- M4 motorway
- New Bridge [R404]
- Liffey Bridge (Celbridge Bridge) [Dublin Road, Celbridge]
- A footbridge immediately to the south of the road bridge in Celbridge
- Rock Bridge [footbridge at Celbridge Abbey]
- Straffan Bridge
- A truss bridge just west of Straffan Bridge
- The Bridge at 16 [19th century wrought iron pedestrian suspension bridge crossing the south channel of the river to the 17th tee in the Kildare Hotel and Golf Club]
- A bridge crossing the north channel of the river 60 metres from The Bridge at 16
- An agricultural access bridge west of The K Club
- Alexandra Bridge [Clane]
- Millicent Bridge [near Sallins]
- Leinster Aqueduct Grand Canal crossing

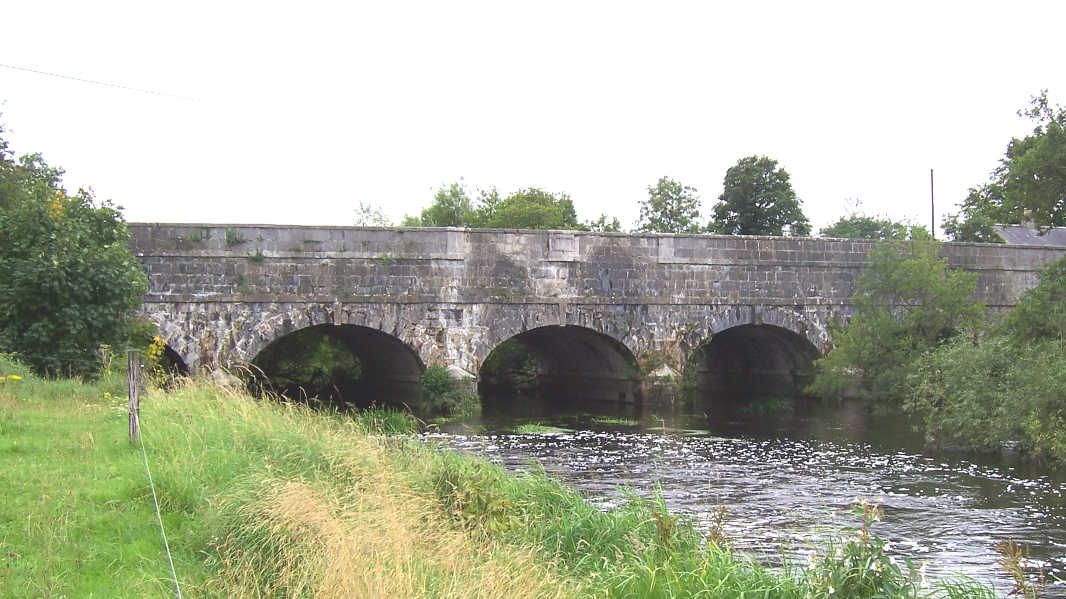
Leinster Aqueduct of the Grand Canal, Ireland over the Liffey, constructed by Richard Evans

- Railway bridge, MP 19 [Dublin to Cork railway crossing]
- Caragh Bridge [Caragh]
- Victoria Bridge (L2030)
- Victoria Bridge (L2030)
- Newbridge College footbridge
- Saint Conleth's Bridge, Newbridge
- M7 Motorway
- L2032 at Athgarvan
- M9 Motorway
- Castlemartin Bridge
- Kilcullen Bridge or The Bridge, Kilcullen (Bridge), County Kildare
- The "New Bridge" at Harristown, constructed in 1788 (part of the modern day R412 road)

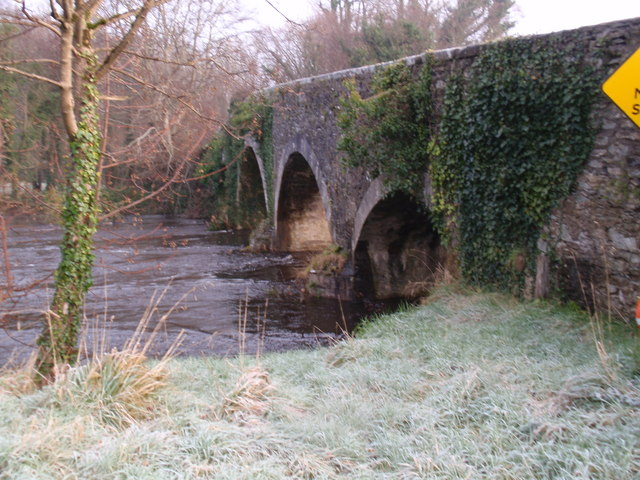
The New Bridge at Harristown, constructed in 1788

- The "Old Bridge" at Brannockstown (located within the private grounds of Harristown House), "probably dat(ing) from the second half of the 17th-century"
- R411 Ballymore Eustace
- Poulaphouca Bridge
- R758 Burgage Moyle Bridge
- Ballyward Bridge L8375
- Ballysmuttan Bridge L4377
- Pedestrian footbridge close to Kippure Lodge
- Private access road to the Coronation Plantation
- R759
- Liffey Head Bridge

== Bridges on the Grand Canal ==
Bridges on the Grand Canal from the River Liffey to the south and west. In addition, many of the canal locks allow for pedestrian crossing.

Name	Alternate names	Connections	Notes	Image
MacMahon Bridge	Draw Bridge, Brunswick Bascule, Victoria Bridge (1857 and 1900 bridges)	Ringsend Road, Pearse Street - R802	Named after General Seán Mac Mahon. Rebuilt in 2007. Previous bridges in 1791, 1857, 1900 and 1960 (or possibly 1962).	
Victoria Bridge	Rail bridge	Dublin to Rosslare railway line		
Maquay Bridge		Grand Canal Street - R815	Named after George Macquay, a director of the Grand Canal Company in 1791. There is not much information on the present bridge, though it is likely to date from the late 1930s like other reconstructed canal bridges in Dublin at that time.	
Mount Street Bridge	McKenny's Bridge, Conyngham Bridge (original name)	Northumberland Road, Mount Street Lower - R118	Built in 1791 and widened prior to 1916 and in 1956. Named after Thomas McKenny, a director of the Grand Canal Company in 1791. Scene of the battle of Mount Street Bridge in the Easter Rising.	British soldiers examine a car on Mount Street Bridge, May 1916.
Huband Bridge		Mount Street Crescent	Named after Joseph Huband, a director of the Grand Canal Company. Looks more ornate than other bridges as Huband paid for the bridge himself. The bridge was a favourite spot for the poet Patrick Kavanagh.	
Macartney Bridge	Baggot Street Bridge	Baggot Street - R816	Built in 1791 and named after George McCartney, chairman of the Grand Canal Company. This area of the canal along towards Leeson Street Bridge was an area often used by sex workers at night. In 1998 a prostitute was murdered over an alleged debt.	
Eustace Bridge	Leeson Street Bridge	Leeson Street - R138	Built in 1791. Named after Lieutenant Colonel Charles Eustace, M.P. and Deputy Chairman of the Grand Canal Company. Tram tracks were added in 1870 along with an adjacent water mains pipe, bringing water from the Vartry Reservoir scheme. For Queen Victoria's royal visit in 1900 it was decided to greet the queen with an old tradition of a triumphal arch. Originally Balls Bridge was chosen as the location, but the electric tram wires were deemed too high to make it practical, so instead Leeson Street Bridge was selected. The gate, though painted to look like limestone, was actually a wooden structure held in place by guide wires. Similar '30 foot' structures were built for the royal visits in 1903 and 1911. In 1959 there was a proposal to reconstruct the bridge. A number of drownings occurred at this location.	Wooden gate for Queen Victoria's Royal visit to Dublin, 1900
Luas bridge		Luas Green line	Opened in 2004. Bridge dedicated to Professor Simon H Perry in 2005. Previous railway bridge, Canal Bridge, was dismantled in 1959 when the Harcourt Street line was closed.	
Charlemont Bridge	Ranelagh Bridge	Ranelagh Road, Charlemont Street - R117	Often mistakenly called Ranelagh Bridge. Named after the adjoining street. There was a failed assassination attempt by the IRA of General Hugh Tudor in January 1921, as part of the Irish War of Independence. The bridge was reconstructed in 1940.	
La Touche Bridge	Portobello Bridge	Rathmines Road Lower, Richmond Street South - R114	Built in 1791, named after William Digges La Touche, a director of the Grand Canal Company. In 1861 a horse-drawn carriage fell into the lock with a loss of all 6 passengers and all horses. Tram tracks were first added in 1871, with overhead electricity completed in 1896. During the Easter Rising and Civil War there were a number of events that took place at the bridge due to its strategic location. In 1928 a bridge widening scheme was undertaken jointly by Dublin Corporation and Rathmines Urban District Council, the bridge was widened by 10 feet and steel lock gates were added. Maintenance work was carried out in 2004 (steel parts of bridge replaced).	Tram crossing the Portobello Bridge 1948.
Robert Emmet Bridge	Clanbrassil Bridge (original name), Harold's Cross Bridge	Harold's Cross Road, Clanbrassil Street Upper - R137	The original, Clanbrassil Bridge, was built in 1791 with tram tracks added in 1879 along with a longer approach to the bridge to lessen the gradient. The bridge was rebuilt in 1935-36 and renamed to Emmet Bridge in honour of the rebellion leader Robert Emmet, who was arrested in the vicinity in 1803. There is a ghost bike attached to railings beside the bridge.	
Parnell Bridge	Sally's Bridge	Clogher Road	Built in 1791 and named after John Parnell (the great-great-grandfather of Charles Stewart Parnell), but known generally as Sally's Bridge. The origins of the name are unknown with a number of explanations offered: a local man, John Sally, who had a farm near where Clogher Road now stands; that it got its name from the nearby River Saile or Salach; a 'lady of the night' who worked in the area. In 1938 an Irish Times article suggested the road was once a toll bridge and an old woman called Sally was the toll collector. The road was doubled in width during an upgrade in 1938.	
Camac Bridge	Dolphin's Barn Bridge	Dolphin's Barn, Crumlin Road - R110	Built in 1791. Named after Turner Camac, a director of the Grand Canal Company. Bridge works were carried out during 1938. Repair works took place in 1964.	
Herberton Bridge	Harberton Bridge	Herberton Road	Named after Lord Viscount Harberton, a director of the Grand Canal Company. The original bridge was replaced by a concrete bridge in 1938. The road was named after the bridge but at some point around 1878, Harberton became Herberton.	
Rialto Bridge	Harcourt Bridge (official name)	Over Luas Red Line South Circular Road - R811	This was on the former main line of the Grand Canal. During the construction of the canal a temporary wooden bridge was built in 1766. in 1795 an elegant stone bridge was constructed, which lasted until 1939 when a new wider concrete bridge was built. In 1974 the canal section was filled in. When the Luas Red Line was opened in 2004 the bridge was altered with the parapet raised above eye level. Original name of bridge comes from Simon Harcourt, 1st Earl Harcourt, Lord Lieutenant 1772–76. The name Rialto comes from a local area and is not related to the Italian Rialto Bridge.	
Griffith Bridge		Grand Canal View	Named after Richard Griffith, a director in 1791 (father of the late Sir Richard Griffith). Used only as an access road for apartments since the adjacent Suir Road bridge was built in 1938.	
Ann Devlin Bridge	Luas Bridge	Luas Red Line	Built in 2004 for the Luas Red Line. Named in honour of Irish republican Anne Devlin. The plaque on the bridge spells her name as Ann Devlin, though on her gravestone in Glasnevin Cemetery it is spelled as Anne Devlin.	
Suir Road Bridge		Suir Road - R111	Built in 1938 as part of a new road in Dublin in the expanding suburbs.	
Footbridge at Goldenbridge Luas station			Pedestrian access.	
Footbridge at Drimnagh Luas station			Pedestrian access. Built in 2004 for opening of Luas Red Line.	
Blackhorse Bridge	Kelly's Bridge	Naas Road, Tyrconnell Road - R810	Upgrade works took place in 1938.	
New Bridge		Kylemore Road - R112	Built around 1955. Although it has a pedestrian underpass it was not deemed large enough for the greenway.	
Ballyfermot Bridge		Old Killeen Road	Built around 1775.	
Killeen Road Bridge		Killeen Road	Has a limited underpass for pedestrians.	
Park West Avenue			Has a large underpass for pedestrians.	
M50 Motorway		Western Parkway Motorway - M50	Built between 1987 and 1990. Has a large underpass for pedestrians.	
Clondalkin Bridge	Ninth Lock Bridge	Ninth Lock Road	Repair works in 1951.	
Fonthill Road		R113		
Outer Ring Road		R136	Built in 2008, has a large underpass.	
Footbridge			Built in 2008 for the greenway, has a large underpass.	
Lucan Road Bridge	12th Lock Bridge	R120	Built around 1770, one of the first bridges on the Grand Canal. Widened in 1932 and again in 2020.	
Gollierstown Bridge			Built circa 1780. Damaged in November 1934. Currently used only as farm crossing and is gated to prevent crossing.	
Hazelhatch Bridge		R405		
Aylmer's Bridge		Lyons Road - L5064	Built in 1782 or 1784, depending on sources. Lies on the border between County Kildare and County Dublin.	

== Bridges on the Royal Canal ==
Bridges on the Royal Canal from the River Liffey to the north and west. Many of the bridges include a rail crossing for the rail lines adjacent to the canal in much of Dublin. In addition, many of the canal locks allow for pedestrian crossing and several pedestrian bridges are located adjacent to Iarnród Éireann railway stations.

- North Wall Quay Scherzer bascule bridge [North Wall Quay - R801]
- Spencer Dock Bridge [Mayor Street] - Luas bridge.
- Sheriff Street Lifting Bridge (inoperable) [Sheriff Street - R101]
- Ossory Road railway bridge (comprising three independent bridge structures) [DART bridge]
- Railway bridge [lifting bridge], sometimes referred to as "Effin bridge".
- Newcomen Bridge [North Strand Road - R105]
- Clarke's Bridge [Summerhill Parade, Ballybough Road - R803]
- Footbridge for access to Croke Park
- Clonliffe Bridge (Russell Street Bridge) [Russell Street, Jones's Road]
- Binns Bridge [Drumcondra Road - R132]
- Cross Guns Bridge (Westmoreland Bridge) [Phibsborough Road, Prospect Road - R135]
  - Blaquiere Bridge over the former city spur of the Royal Canal [North Circular Road - R101]
  - New Cabra Road - R147
  - Connaught Street
- Railway bridge at Liffey Junction
- Broom Bridge (Broome Bridge, Brougham Bridge) [Broombridge Road]
- Ratoath Road bridge- R805
- Reilly Bridge (Reily's Bridge)
- Railway tunnel
- Railway bridge at Liffey Junction
- Longford Bridge [Ashtown Road - L3101]
- Dunsink Lane Bridge [New River Road]
- Ranelagh Bridge [disused]
- Roundabout of Junction 6 of M50 motorway - two bridges
- Royal Canal aqueduct over the M50 motorway
- Talbot Bridge [Old Navan Road]
- Granard Bridge [Castleknock Road - R806]
- Kirkpatrick Bridge [Carpenterstown Road, Coolmine Road]
- Dr. Troy Bridge [Diswellstown Road - L3036]
- Porterstown Bridge [Porterstown Road - L3035]
- Kennan Bridge (Neville Bridge) [Porterstown Road]
- Callaghan Bridge (Carhampton Bridge) R121
- Railway bridge
- Pakenham Bridge (Barberstown Bridge)
- Collins Bridge [Barnhill Crossroads - L3005]
- Royal Canal passes into County Kildare
- Cope Bridge [Captain's Hill - R149]
- Royal Canal aqueduct over the Rye Water
- Louisa Bridge R148
- R449
- Deey Bridge
- Pike Bridge [L5053]
- Mullen Bridge [Straffan Road - R406]
- Footbridge
- Bond Bridge [Parson Street, Clane Road - R408]
- Royal Canal aqueduct over the River Lyreen
- Jackson's Bridge

== Bridges over the River Dodder ==
Bridges over the River Dodder from the River Liffey to the southwest.

Name	Alternate names	Connections	Notes	Image
Ringsend Bridge		Ringsend Road, Bridge Street - R802	Opened in 1812.	
London Bridge		Bath Avenue, Londonbridge Road - R111	Opened in 1857. Where the Swan River joins. Traffic restricted to single lane by traffic lights.	
New Bridge	Herbert's Bridge, Lansdowne Bridge	Herbert's Road, Lansdowne Road		
DART bridge		Dublin to Rosslare railway line	Includes pedestrian crossing. Original bridge built in 1834.	
Ball's Bridge		Pembroke Road, Merrion Road - R118	Gives name to the neighbourhood. 1st bridge built in 1751, 2nd bridge built in 1791. 3rd bridge built in 1835, widened and improved in 1904.	
Bridge at Herbert Park		Connects Herbert Park Hotel to Anglesea Road.		
Anglesea Bridge	Stillorgan Bridge	Donnybrook Road, Stillorgan Road - R138	First bridge built in 1832.	
Footbridge		Beaver Row and Brookvale Road		
Clonskeagh Bridge		Clonskeagh Road - R825		
Milltown Bridge		Dundrum Road - R117	Includes pedestrian underpass.	
Packhorse Bridge (Old Milltown Bridge)		1650s stone footbridge at Milltown Road and Bankside Cottages		
The Nine Arches Bridge	Luas Bridge	Luas Green Line	Opened in 1859 for Harcourt Street railway line. Closed in 1958 and reopened in 2004 for the Luas. No access for pedestrians.	
Classon's Bridge		Churchtown Road Lower - L3001	Includes pedestrian underpass. Widened in 1928.	
Footbridge at Dartry Mills			No public access to bridge.	
Footbridge at Dartry Park		Dartry Park		
Orwell Bridge	Waldron's Bridge	Orwell Road	Includes pedestrian underpass. First built in 1848, financed by Patrick Waldron.	
Footbridge at Orwell Park				
Pearse Bridge		Rathfarnham Road - R114	First bridge (called Big Bridge) destroyed by a flood in 1754, a new bridge was constructed in 1765. Widened and named in honour of the Pearse brothers in 1953.	
Dodder Stones		Dodder Valley Park to Bushy Park	Not a bridge but a way for pedestrians to cross the Dodder.	
Footbridge at Dodder Valley Park near Rathfarnham		Dodder Valley Park		
Bridge at Springfield Avenue		Springfield Avenue - R112	Includes pedestrian underpass.	
Templeogue Bridge		Old Bridge Road - R817	Includes pedestrian underpass.	
Spawell Bridge		Spawell Link Road - L4023	Opened 5 February 2001. Includes pedestrian underpass.	
M50 Bridge		M50	Includes pedestrian underpass.	
Footbridge near Tymon		Dodder Valley Park and Tymon Park		
Dodder Greenway Foot/Cycle Bridge		Avonmore Road	Opened 2021	A short walking/cycling bridge that is over the Dodder river
Dodder Greenway Foot/Cycle Bridge, Firhouse		Old Bawn and Killininny	Opened 14 November 2014	Pedestrian / Cycle Bridge across River Dodder near Firhouse, Dublin, Ireland
Old Bawn Bridge		Old Bawn Road - R113	Opened in May 2000.	
Fort Bridge		Bohernabreena Road - R114		

Upstream of Fort Bridge the river flows through the Bohernabreena Water Works. There are a number of bridges, but it is not clear which channels are the Dodder and which are not. Upstream of the Water Works, there are a number of feeder streams and it is debatable which one is the Dodder.

== Bridges over the River Tolka ==
Bridges over the River Tolka from the River Liffey to the northwest.

- Bridge to East Point Business Park
- M50 Motorway
- John McCormack Bridge - R834
- Dublin to Belfast railway line
- Fairview Park Footbridge
- Annesley Bridge - R105
- Luke Kelly Bridge (Ballybough Bridge) - R803
- Distillery Road Bridge [foot bridge]
- Frank Flood Bridge (previously 'Drumcondra Bridge' until 2018)
- Two footbridges in Griffith Park
- Dean Swift Bridge (St. Mobhi Bridge) [St. Mobhi Road]
- Glasnevin Bridge
- Footbridge in Botanic Gardens
- Tolka Bridge (Finglas Bridge)
- Finglaswood Bridge
- Cardiff's Bridge
- Ashtown Bridge
- M50 Motorway

== Other bridges ==
- Bow Bridge over the River Camac (Cammock) connecting Irwin Street and Bow Lane West
- William Dargan Bridge, a Luas Green Line bridge over the R112 and R117 regional roads and the Slang River
- Golden Bridge over the River Camac at the Tyrconnell Road end of Emmet Road, Inchicore.
- Knocksedan Bridge over the River Ward west of Swords on the Naul Road
- Broadmeadow Estuary Bridge of the M1 over the Broadmeadow Estuary near Swords
- Mayne Bridge over the Mayne River at its mouth in northern Baldoyle on the Coast Road
- O'Connell Bridge, St Stephen's Green, crossing the lake in the park.
- Portmarnock Bridge over the River Sluice just west of Portmarnock on the Strand Road
- Scotchstone Bridge over the River Ward in Swords
- Wellfield Bridge over the Mayne River north of Donaghmede near The Hole in the Wall Road
- Wooden Bridge connecting Clontarf Road with the western end of North Bull Island

== Tunnels ==
- Dublin Port Tunnel
- Phoenix Park Tunnel
- Railway tunnel under the Royal Canal
- Grand Canal Sewer Tunnel
- Liffey Service Tunnel

== See also ==
- List of bridges in the Republic of Ireland
- List of Dublin Gates
- List of rivers of County Dublin
- List of streets and squares in Dublin
- Streets and squares in Dublin
- Transport in Dublin
