= List of streets and squares in Dublin =

This is a list of notable streets and squares in Dublin, Ireland.

English street or square name	Irish street or square name	Date	Historical names	Route number	Dublin postal district	Sections	Continuations	Termini and major cross-streets
Abbey Street	Sráid na Mainistreach	1728			1	Lower, middle, upper	Mary's Abbey	Beresford Pl, Capel St
Ailesbury Road	Bóthar Ailesbury, Bóthar Aelsbaire			R824	4			Sydney Parade Ave, Merrion Rd, Anglesea Rd
Amiens Street	Sráid Amiens	1800	The Strand (1728)	R105	1		North Strand Rd, Memorial Road	Memorial Rd, Talbot St, Portland Row / Seville Pl
Anglesea Road	Bóthar Mon			R815	4		Beaver Row	Merrion Road, Stillorgan Road
Anglesea Street	Sráid Anglesea	1740s–50s		R137	2		Bedford Row	College Green, Fleet Street, Cope Street
Anne Street South (South Anne Street)	Sráid Anna Theas	1723	South St Anne St		2		Harry St	Grafton St, Dawson St
Baggot Street	Sráid Bhagóid	1773	Gallows Road (1756), Blackrock Rd (Baggot St Upper, 1800)	R816	2, 4	Lower, upper	Merrion Row, Pembroke Rd	Merrion St Upper, Fitzwilliam Street, Mespil Road / Haddington Road, Waterloo Rd, Eastmoreland Pl
Bayside Boulevard	Búlbhard Chois Bá				13	S, n	Verbena Lawn (Plásóg Bheirbhéine)	Dublin Rd, Bayside Sq, Verbena Ave
Bridge Street	Sráid an Droichid	1317		R108	8	Lower, upper	Fr Mathew Bridge (Droichead an Athar Maitiú)	Usher's Quay / Merchant's Quay, Cornmarket / High St
Capel Street	Sráid Chéipil	1697		R803 (part)	1		Grattan Bridge (Droichead Grattan)	Ormond Quay, Mary's Abbey / Abbey St Upper, Little Mary St / Mary St, Parnell St, Bolton St
Carrickbrack Road	Bóthar Charraig Bhreac			R105	13		Greenfield Rd (Bóthar an Ghoirt Ghlais)	Strand Rd (also known as Sutton Strand), Thormanby Rd
Cathal Brugha Street	Sráid Chathal Brugha		Gregg's Lane and part of Upper Gloucester Street		1		Seán McDermott Street	Cumberland Street North, O'Connell Street
Clyde Road	Bóthar Cluaidh				4		Wellington Pl	Elgin Road, Raglan Rd, Pembroke Park / Wellington Road
College Green	Faiche an Choláiste	1666	Hoggen Green (1635), The Old Shore (1734)	R138	2		Dame St	Grafton St / Westmoreland St
Cope Street	Sráid Cope	1756	Cope Street South, South Cope Street (prior to 1821)		2			Fownes St, Crown Alley, Anglesea St
Crampton Court	Cúirt Crampton				2			Essex Street East, Dame Street
Dame Street	Sráid an Dáma	1610	Teyngmouth St (1348), Damask St (1661)	R137	2		College Green, Cork Hill – Lord Edward St	Anglesea Street, Great Georges St S, Parliament St / Cork Hill
Dawson Street	Sráid Dhásain	1723		R138	2			Nassau St, Molesworth St, St Stephen's Green
Great Denmark Street	Sráid na Danmhairge Mhór	1770			1		Gardiner Place, Gardiner Row	Parnell Square, North Great George's Street, Temple Street, Gardiners Row
Dorset Street	Sráid Dorset	1756	Drumcondra La (1728)	R132, R804	1	Lower, upper	Drumcondra Rd, Bolton St	Dominick St, Binns Br (Royal Canal), N Circular Rd
Drumcondra Road	Bóthar Dhroim Conrach			R132	9	Lower, upper	Dorset St Lower, Swords Rd	Binns Br (Royal Canal), Clonliffe Rd, Griffith Ave
East Wall Road	Bóthar an Phoiirt Thoir			R131	1, 3		East-Link Toll Bridge, Poplar Row	North Wall Quay, Sheriff St Upper, Alfie Byrne Rd, North Strand Rd / Annesley Bridge
Eccles Street	Sráid Eccles	1772			7		Temple St N	Dorset St, Berkeley Rd
Ely Place	Plás Íle	1773			2	Ely Place, Ely Place Upper	Merrion St Upper	Merrion Row / Baggot St Lower
Fishamble Street	Sráid Sheamlas an Éisc		Fish St (1470), Fisher St (1570)		2			Essex Quay / Wood Quay, Essex St W, Lord Edward St / Christchurch Pl
Fitzwilliam Square	Cearnóg Mhic Liam, Cearnóg Fitzwilliam	1794		R138 (west)	2	N, s, e, w	Pembroke Street, Fitzwilliam Street, Fitzwilliam Place	Fitzwilliam Place, Pembroke Street Upper
Fleet Street	Sráid na Toinne				2		Townsend St, Temple Bar	Westmoreland St, Bedford Row, Aston Pl
Gardiner Street	Sráid Ghairdinéir	1792	Old Rope Walk (1756)	R802	1	Lower, middle, upper	Synnott Place	Beresford Place, Talbot St, Parnell St / Summerhill, Dorset Street
Gilford Road	Bóthar Gilford				4		Seafort Ave	Sandymount Green, Sandymount Ave, Park Ave, Strand Rd
Golden Lane	Lána an Óir				2		Bull Alley Street, Stephen Street Upper	Bride Street, Chancery Lane, Whitefriar Street
Grafton Street	Sráid Grafton	1708		R138 (part)	2		College Green – Westmoreland St, St Stephen's Green	College Green, Nassau St / Suffolk St, St Stephen's Green
Harcourt Street	Sráid Fhearchair	19th Century			2		St Stephen's Green	Harcourt Road, Cuffe Street, St Stephen's Green
Harcourt Terrace	Árdán Fhearchair	1830			2			Adelaide Road, Charlemont Place
Henrietta Street	Sráid Henrietta	1724			1			Bolton St, King's Inns
Henry Street	Sráid Anraí	1724			1		Earl St N, Mary St	O'Connell St, Moore St, Liffey St Upper
Herbert Park	Páirc Hoirbeaird				4		Marlborough Rd	Pembroke Road, Morehampton Rd / Donnybrook Rd
Herbert Road	Bóthar Hoirbeaird				4			Lansdowne Rd, Tritonville Rd
Herbert Street	Sráid Hoirbeaird	1700s			2		Mount St. Crescent	Lower Baggot Street, Mount St. Crescent
Heytesbury Street	Sráid Heytesbury	1846			8		Stamer St, New Bride St	Pleasants St, Harrington St
Howth Road	Bóthar Bhinn Éadair			R105	3, 5, 13		Dublin Rd (between Sutton Cross and Kilbarrack Road, the Howth Road is known as Dublin Road), Harbour Rd	Fairview, Collins Ave E, Sybil Hill Rd / Brookwood Ave, Main St / Station Rd (both Raheny), James Larkin Rd, Kilbarrack Rd, Greenfield Road / Station Rd (both Sutton, Dublin)
Kildare Street	Sráid Chill Dara	1756	Coote St	R138	2			Nassau Street / Leinster St S, Molesworth St, St Stephen's Green
Leeson Street	Sráid Líosain	1765	Suesey St (1728)	R138	2, 4	Lower, upper	Morehampton Rd, St Stephen's Green	St Stephen's Green, Grand Parade / Mespil Rd, The Appian Way, Wellington Pl
Liffey Street	Sráid na Life	1675	Little Denmark Street (Liffey Street Upper from 1772 onwards) Liffey Street Middle (Liffey Street Upper from 1772)		1	Lower, upper	Ha'penny Bridge	Abbey Street, Henry Street
Marlborough Street	Sráid Mhaoilbhríde, Sráid Maoilbhríde, Sráid Marlborough		Great Marlborough St (1728)		1		Rosie Hackett Bridge	Eden Quay, Abbey St Lower, Earl St N / Talbot St, Parnell St
Marrowbone Lane	Lána Mhuire Mhaith, Lána Mhuire	1743		R804	8		Thomas Court	School St / Earl St S, Cork Street
Merrion Road	Bóthar Mhuirfean			R118	4		Pembroke Rd, Rock Rd	Anglesea Rd, Serpentine Ave, Simmonscourt Road, Ailesbury Road, Nutley Lane, Strand Road
Merrion Square	Cearnóg Mhuirfean	1769		R118 (north)	2	N, s, e, w	Merrion Street Lower, Clare Street, Mount Street Lower, Mount Street Upper, Fitzwilliam Street Lower, Merrion Street Upper	Merrion Street Lower / Clare Street, Holles Street, Mount Street Lower, Mount Street Upper / Fitzwilliam Street Lower, Merrion Street Upper
Merrion Street	Sráid Mhuirfean	1723	Merrion Lane (1728)		2	Lower, upper	Merrion Square W (between Merrion Square N and Merrion Square S, Merrion Street is known as Merrion Square W), Ely Place	Fenian St, Clare St / Merrion Square, Merrion Row / Baggot St Lower
Molesworth Street	Sráid Theach Laighean	1756			2			Dawson St, Kildare St
Mount Street Lower	Sráid na Mhóta Íocht				2		Merrion Square North and Northumberland Road	Merrion Square and McKenny's Bridge
Mountjoy Square	Cearnóg Mhuinseo	1792		R802 (west)	1	N, s, e, w	Gardiner Street Upper, Gardiner Place, Belvedere Place, Fitzgibbon Street, Gardiner Street Middle, Grenville Street	Gardiner Street Upper / Gardiner Place, Belvedere Place / Fitzgibbon Street, Gardiner Street Middle / Grenville Street
Naas Road	Bóthar an Náis			R110	8, 12		Tyrconnell Rd	Davitt Rd, Kylemore Rd / Walkinstown Ave, Long Mile Road / Nangor Road, M50 motorway, Fonthill Rd S / Belgard Rd, Citywest Rd
Nassau Street	Sráid Thobar Phádraig, Sráid Nassau	1756	St Patrick's Well Lane (1728)	R138	2		Suffolk St, Leinster St S	Grafton St, Dawson St, Kildare St
Newbridge Avenue	Ascaill an Droichid Nua				4		Sandymount Rd	Herbert Rd, Tritonville Rd
North Circular Road	Cuarbhóthar Thuaidh	1800		R101, R135	1, 7		Infirmary Road, Portland Row	Summerhill / Summerhill Parade, Dorset St Lower, Berkeley Road, Phibsborough Rd, Cabra Road, Prussia St / Old Cabra Rd, Aughrim Street / Blackhorse Avenue, Infirmary Rd
North Great George's Street	Sráid Mór Seóirse Thuaidh	1766			1			Great Denmark Street, Parnell Street
North Strand Road	Bóthar na Trá, Thuaidh	1803	The Strand (1728, 1756)	R105	1, 3		Amiens St, Annesley Bridge Rd	Portland Row / Seville Pl, Poplar Row / East Wall Rd
Nutley Lane	Lána Nutley, Lána Nothaile				4		Greenfield Park	Merrion Rd, Stillorgan Rd
O'Connell Street	Sráid Uí Chonaill	1924	Drogheda St (1728–1809), Sackville St (1809–1924)		1	Lower, upper	O'Connell Bridge, Cavendish Row – Parnell Sq E	Bachelors Walk / Eden Quay, Henry St / Earl St N, Parnell St
Park Avenue	Ascaill na Páirce				4			Gilford Rd, Sydney Parade Ave
Parliament Street	Sráid na Parlaiminte, Sráid na Feise	1766	Essex Bridge (→1887, lower portion only)		2		Grattan Bridge	Essex Quay / Wellington Quay, Lord Edward St / Dame St
Parnell Square	Cearnóg Parnell	1728	Rutland Square	R132, R135 (e, w)	1	N, e, w	Granby Row, North Frederick Street, Gardiner Row, Cavendish Row	Parnell Street, Granby Row, Frederick Street North, Gardiner Row, Cavendish Row
Parnell Street	Sráid Parnell		Great Britain St (1728–1911)	R803, R132 (part), R135 (part)	1		Little Britain Street, Summerhill	Capel St, Jervis St, Moore St, Parnell Sq / O'Connell St, Gardiner St
Pearse Street	Sráid an Phiarsaigh, Sráid Piarsach		Moss Lane, Great Brunswick Street (1795-?)	R118, R802,	2		College St, Ringsend Rd	D'Olier St, Tara St, Westland Row / Lombard St E, Erne St, Macken St, MacMahon Br (Grand Canal)
Pembroke Road	Bóthar Pheambróg, Bóthar Pembróc, Bóthar Penfro	1835	Blackrock Rd (1800)	R118	4		Baggot St Upper, Merrion Rd	Waterloo Road, Northumberland Rd, Herbert Park, Shelbourne Rd, Ball's Br (River Dodder)
Prussia Street	Sráid na Prúise	1750s	Cabragh Road (1760)	R805	7		Old Cabra Road, Manor Street	North Circular Road, Aughrim Street, St Joseph's Road
Raglan Road	Bóthar Raglan, Bóthar Raiglean, Bóthar Rhaglan	1857			4			Pembroke Rd, Clyde Rd
St John's Road East (St John's Road)	Bóthar Eoin Thoir, Bóthar San Eoin Thoir, Bóthar Eoin				4			Strand Road, Park Avenue
St Stephen's Green	Faiche Stiabhna, Faiche Stiofáin	1250		R138 (n, s, w), R110 (south)	2	N, s, e, w		
Sandymount Avenue	Ascaill Dhumhach Thrá, Ascaill Dumhaighe				4		Simmonscourt Rd	Merrion Rd, Gilford Rd
Seán McDermott Street	Sráid Sheáin Mhic Dhiarmada	1770	Great Martin's Lane (to 1764); Gloucester Street (1764–1933)		1	Lower, Upper	Cathal Brugha Street (west); Killarney Street (east)	Buckingham Street, Gardiner Street
Serpentine Avenue	Ascaill na Lúb				4			Merrion Rd, Tritonville Road / Claremont Rd
Ship Street Little	Sráid na gCaorach Bheag	1250	Poole Street		8	Little, Great	Ship Street Great	Golden Lane, Bride Street, Werburgh Street
South Circular Road	An Cuarbhóthar Theas, Cuarbhóthar Theas	1773		R811	8		Harrington St	?, Clanbrassil St, Dolphin's Barn, Suir Rd, Emmet Rd, Inchicore Rd, Con Colbert Rd (N4 road), Chapelizod Rd
South William Street	Plás Mhic Liam Theas	1676			2		St. Andrew's St, Johnson Place	Exchequer St, Wicklow St, St. Andrew's St, Johnson Place
Stillorgan Road	Bóthar Stigh Lorgan			R138	4, 18		Donnybrook Rd, Bray Rd	Anglesea Br (River Dodder), Nutley La / Greenfield Park, Mount Merrion Ave, Leopardstown Rd / Newtownpark Ave, Kill La
Stephen Street	Sráid Stiabhna	Medieval			2	Lower, upper	Golden Lane, Johnson Place	Longford St Great, Aungier Street, South Great George's St, Drury St, Digges Ln,
Sydney Parade Avenue	Ascaill Pharáid Sydney, Ascaill Pharáid Sidní				4			Near Merrion Rd, Ailesbury Rd, Park Ave, Strand Rd
Talbot Street	Sráid Talbot, Sráid Thalbóid	1821	Cope St N (1795)		1		Earl St N	Marlborough St, Gardiner St Lower, Amiens St
Temple Bar	Barra an Teampaill, Barra Temple	1707			2		Essex Street East, Fleet Street	Temple La, Bedford Row / Anglesea St
Temple Street	Sráid Temple	1770s			1	Lower, upper	Hardwicke Place, Eccles Street	Gardiner Row, Great Denmark Street
Templeogue Road	Bóthar Teach Mealóg			R137	6W		Terenure Place, Tallaght Road	Terenure Road West, Fergus Road, Olney Crescent, Rathdown Park, Lakelands Park, Rathdown Avenue, Terenure College, Fortfield Road, Springfield Road, Templeville Road, Springfield Avenue, Rosehall, Riverside Cottages, Old Bridge Road (Templeogue Bridge), Cypress Grove Road, Corrybeg, Cheeverstown, Templeogue House, Hillcrest, Wellington Road (Spawell Roundabout), M50 motorway
Templeville Road	Bóthar Baile an Teampaill			R112	6W		Springfield Avenue, Greentrees Road	Templeogue Road, Templeville Park, Fortfield Park, Templeville Avenue, Cypress Grove Road, Wainsfort Road, Wainsfort Crescent, Glendown Road, Grosvenor Court, Wellington Road
Tritonville Road	Bóthar Tritonville				4		Irishtown Rd, Serpentine Ave	Londonbridge Rd / Church Ave, Claremont Rd / Serpentine Ave
Werburgh Street	Sráid San Werburgh, Sráid San Werburga, Sráid Werburgh, Sráid Bhairbre	1257			8		Bride St	Christchurch Pl / Lord Edward St, Bull Alley St / Golden La
Westland Row	Rae an Iarthair	1773	Westland's		2		Lombard Street	Pearse Street / Lincoln Place
Winetavern Street	Sráid an Fhíona	11th century	Taverner's St (1311), Wine-street, vicus tabernariorum vini		8		O'Donovan Rossa Bridge, St Michael's Hill	Merchant's Quay / Wood Quay, High St / Christchurch Pl
