= R171 road (Ireland) =

Road in Ireland

R171 road
- Bóthar R171
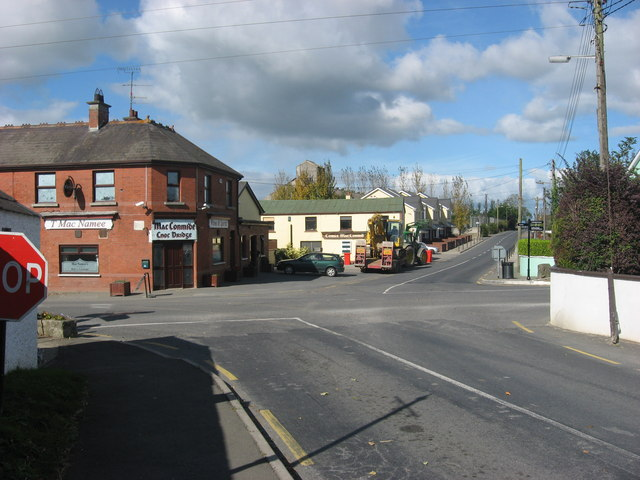
- Knockbridge, on the R171

Route information
- Length: 21 km (13 mi)

Location
- Country: Ireland
- Primary destinations: County Louth; leaves the N2 at Ardee; crosses the R166 at Tallanstown; crosses the M1 motorway at Little Mills; Terminates at junction with the R132 at Dundalk

Highway system
- Roads in Ireland; Motorways; Primary; Secondary; Regional

The R171 road is a regional road in Ireland linking Ardee and Dundalk in County Louth. The road is 21 km (13 mi) long. Clochafarmore is located along the R171.

== See also ==
- Roads in Ireland
- National primary road
- National secondary road
