= R132 road (Ireland) =

Road in Ireland

R132 road
- Bóthar R132
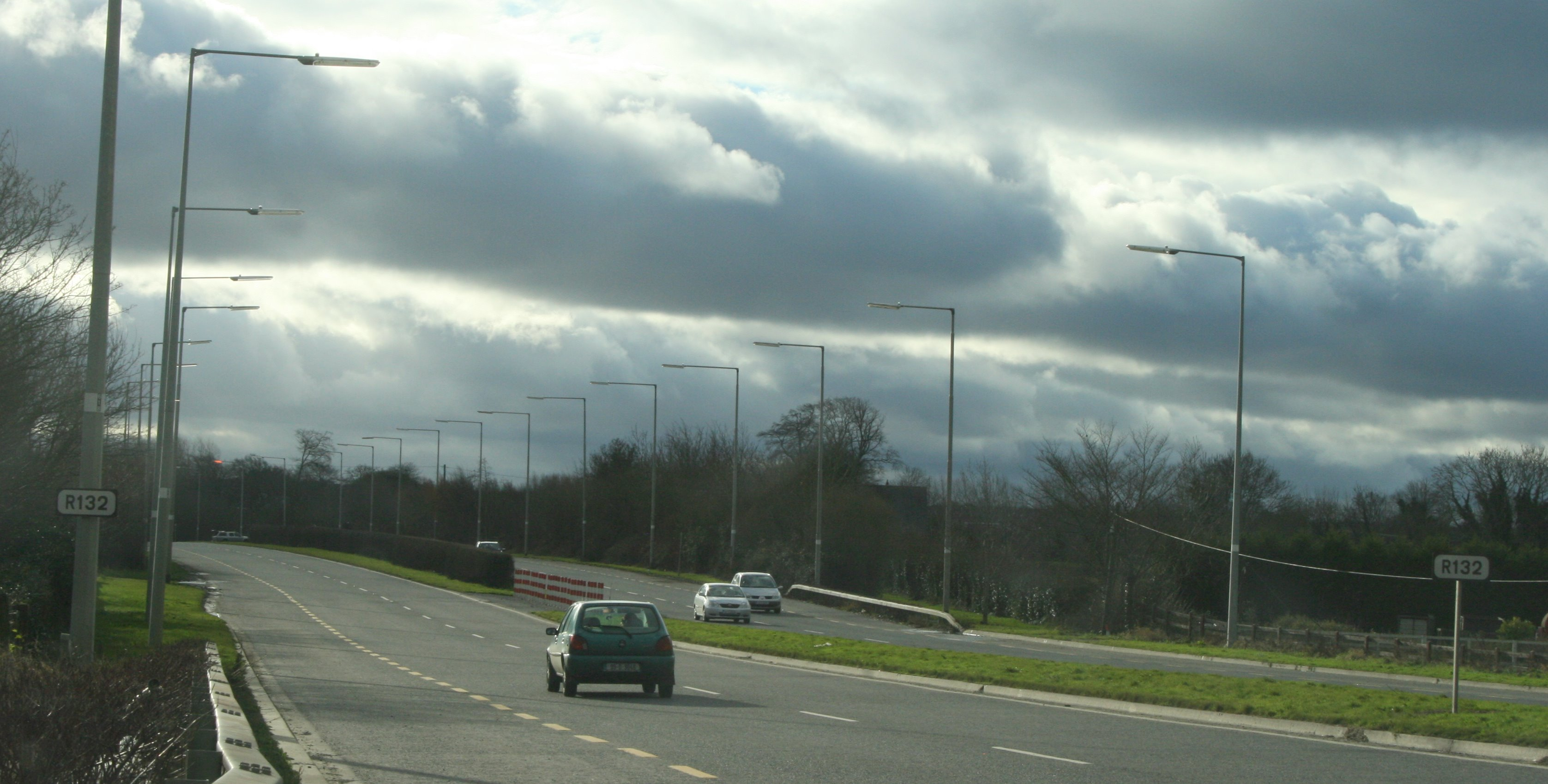
- The R132 southbound near Swords

Route information
- Length: 98.9 km (61.5 mi)

Location
- Country: Ireland
- Primary destinations: County Dublin; Dublin (R803, M1, R131, R102, R103); Crosses the Royal Canal; Drumcondra; Crosses the River Tolka; Santry; Fingal; R125, R106; Swords; Crosses the Ward River; Crosses the Broad Meadow River; M1; Balbriggan (R127, R122); County Meath; Crosses the River Nanny; R150; County Louth; Drogheda (R108, R150, R166); Crosses the River Boyne; N51; M1; Crosses the White River; R169; R170; Dunleer; Crosses the White River; Crosses the River Dee; Crosses the River Glyde; Castlebellingham (R166); Crosses the Fane River; N52; Dundalk (R171, N53, R177); Crosses the Castletown River; N52, N1, R173; R174; Crosses the Flurry River; L7092 local road; Northern Ireland

Highway system
- Roads in Ireland; Motorways; Primary; Secondary; Regional

The R132 road is one of Ireland's newest regional roads, having been classified following the opening M1 motorway which by-passes most of the old N1 route. The R132 is 98.9 kilometres (61.5 mi) long.

By-passed sections of the old N1 were reclassified R132. The route has a highly varying road quality, with some sections of dual carriageway such as the original Swords Bypass, and the original run-in to the M1 Balbriggan Bypass; much wide standard two-lane road, and some very poor segments.

Some sections, such as that through Drogheda, are still signed "N1" though the town was bypassed in 2003. The roundabouts along the original Swords bypass are as of 2026 being changed into crossroads.

== Route ==
The official description of the R132 from the Roads Act 1993 (Classification of Regional Roads) Order 2012 reads:

R132: Dublin — Dundalk, County Louth (Part Old National Route 1)

Between its junction with R803 at Parnell Street in the city of Dublin and its junction with R174 at Feede in the county of Louth via Parnell Square West, Granby Row, Dorset Street Upper (and via North Frederick Street, Parnell Square East and Cavendish Row), Dorset Street Lower, Drumcondra Road Lower, Drumcondra Road Upper and Swords Road (and via Shantalla Bridge) in the city of Dublin: Santry, Turnapin, Cloghran, Miltonsfields, Swords Demesne, Newtown, Lissenhall, Blake's Cross, Coldwinters, Courtlough and Balrothery; Dublin Street, The Square, Bridge Street and Drogheda Street in the town of Balbriggan; and Bremore in the county of Fingal: Knocknagin Bridge at the boundary between the county of Fingal and the county of Meath: Gormanston, Richardstown, Julianstown, Smithstown and Colp West in the county of Meath: Dublin Road, Dublin Gate, James Street, John Street, Rathmullen Road, Bridge of Peace, Georges Square, Georges Street and North Road in the borough of Drogheda: Moneymore, Newtown Monasterboice, Bawntaffe, Mullary Cross, Woodland, Dunleer, Cappoge, Kilsaran, Castlebellingham and Green Gates in the county of Louth: Marshes Upper, Inner Relief Road, Tain Bridge and Dowdallshill in the town of Dundalk: Faughart Lower, and Drumnasillagh, in the county of Louth

and

between its junction with N1 at Drumad in the county of Louth and the boundary between the county of Louth and the county of Armagh at Carrickarnan via Carrickarnan in the county of Louth.

== Junction list ==
The junction list below only includes junctions with national or regional roads.

R132 Junction List
Northbound (read up)	Southbound (read down)
B113 continues towards Newry	Start of R132
Dublin, Belfast (N1)
Dublin, Belfast (N1)	Ravensdale (R174)
Dublin, Belfast (M1, N1)	Carlingford, Greenore (R173)
	Dundalk Eastern By-pass (N52)
Forkill (R177)
Castleblayney (R934 (N53))
Tallanstown (R171), Carrickmacross (R179)	Blackrock (R172)
Ardee (N52)	Dundalk Eastern By-pass (N52)
	Blackrock (R172)
Tallanstown (R166)	Annagassan (R166)
Belfast, Balbriggan (M1)	Donabate (R126), Dublin (M1)
Swords, Ashbourne (R125)
Swords	Malahide (R106), Kinsealy, Drynam (L2065)
Swords	Airside Retail Park, Holywell, Dublin (R125 (M1))
Dublin Airport Terminals 1 & 2	Dublin, Belfast (M1)
Ballymun (R104)	Coolock (R104)
	Airport, Belfast (M50)
Collins Avenue (R103)	Collins Avenue (R103)
Griffith Avenue (R102)	Griffith Avenue (R102)
	Clonliffe Road (R131)
North Circular Road (R101)	North Circular Road (R101)
	Gardiner Street (R802)
(R135)
Parnell Street (R803)	Parnell Street (R803)

== See also ==
- Roads in Ireland
- National primary road
- National secondary road
