= R169 road (Ireland) =

Road in Ireland

R169 road
- Bóthar R169

Route information
- Length: 7 km (4.3 mi)

Location
- Country: Ireland
- Primary destinations: County Louth; Leaves the N2 near Collon; Crosses the M1 near Dunleer; Terminates at junction with the R132 near Dunleer

Highway system
- Roads in Ireland; Motorways; Primary; Secondary; Regional

The R169 road is a regional road in Ireland linking the N2 road, at Collon townland, with the R132 road at Dunleer in County Louth. The road is 7 km (4.3 mi) long.

== See also ==
- Roads in Ireland
- National primary road
- National secondary road
