= R816 road (Ireland) =

Road in Ireland

R816 road
- Bóthar R816
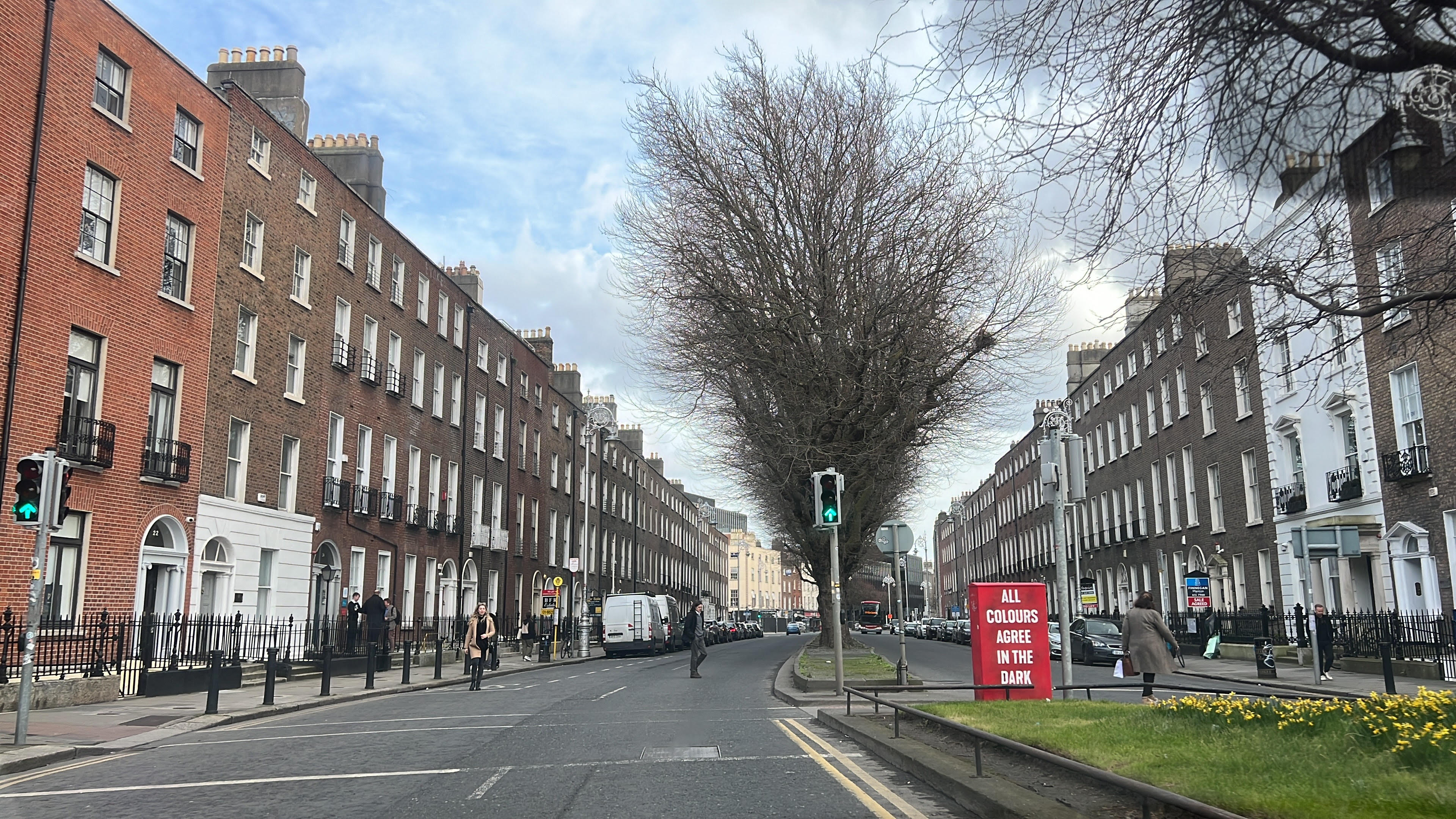
- Lower Baggot Street, on the R816

Route information
- Length: 1.3 km (0.81 mi)

Location
- Country: Ireland
- Primary destinations: Dublin; R138 (Pembroke Street Lower); Baggot Street Lower; Crosses the Grand Canal at Macartny Bridge; Baggot Street Upper; Pembroke Road; R118 (Northumberland Road)

Highway system
- Roads in Ireland; Motorways; Primary; Secondary; Regional

The R816 road is a regional road in Dublin, Ireland.

The official definition of the R816 from the Roads Act, 1993 (Classification of Regional Roads) Order, 2012 states:

R816: Baggot Street, Dublin

Between its junction with R138 at Pembroke Street Lower and its junction with R118 at Northumberland Road via Baggot Street Lower, Baggot Street Upper and Pembroke Road all in the city of Dublin.

The road is 1.3 kilometres (0.81 mi) long.

== See also ==
- Roads in Ireland
- Regional road
