= Dunleer =

Town in County Louth, Ireland

Dunleer Dún Léire Lann Léire
- Town
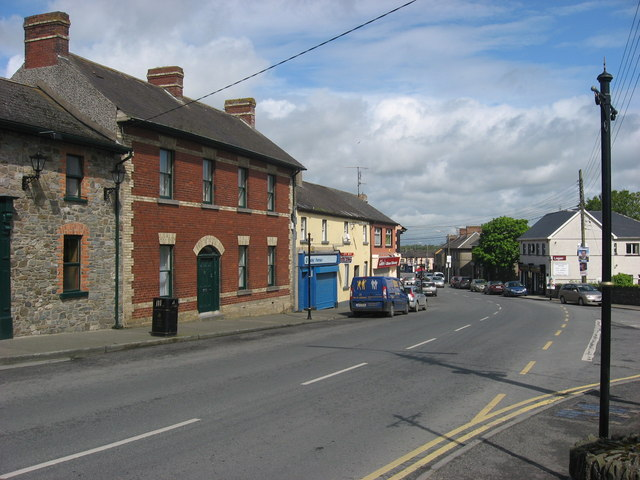
- Upper Main Street, Dunleer

- Location in Ireland
- Coordinates: 53.830°N 6.395°W
- Country: Ireland
- Province: Leinster
- County: County Louth
- Dáil Éireann: Louth
- EU Parliament: Midlands–North-West
- Elevation: 39 m (128 ft)

Population (2022)
  - Total: 2,143
- Time zone: UTC±0 (WET)
  - Summer (DST): UTC+1 (IST)
- Eircode routing key: A91
- Telephone area code: +353(0)41

Dunleer (Irish: Dún Léire) is a town and townland in County Louth, Ireland. Dunleer is midway between Dundalk and Drogheda, at the junction of the R132, R169 and R170 roads. As of the 2022 census, the town had a population of 2,143.

Dunleer used to be the principal town borough in the historical barony of Ferrard and has a charter dating back to 1252. The town is in a civil parish of the same name.

== History ==
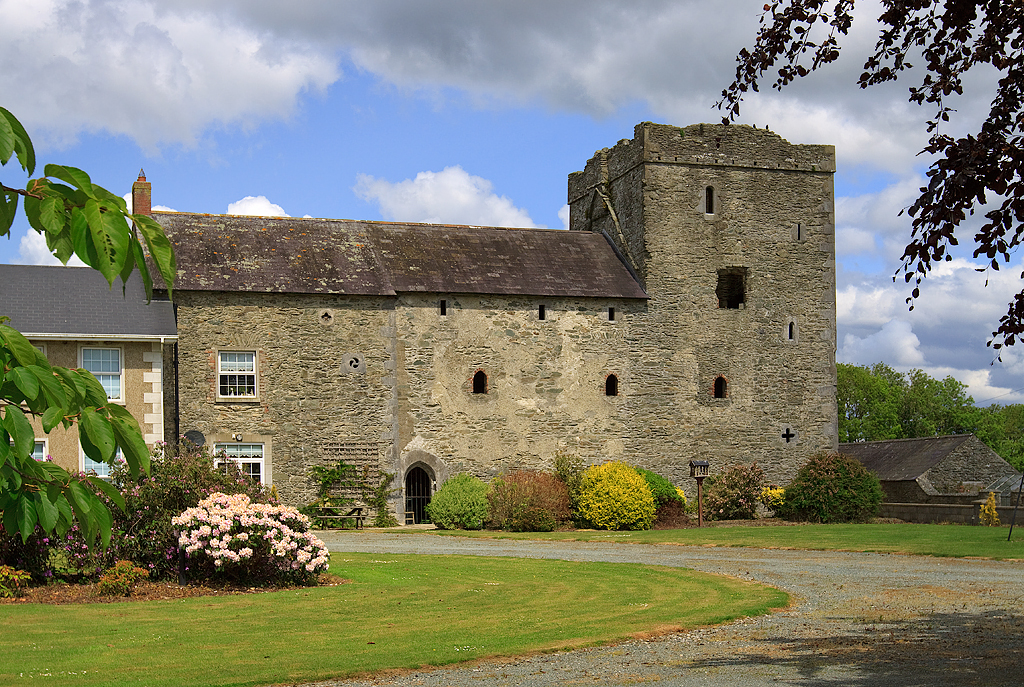
Athclare Castle lies approximately 1.5km south of Dunleer

The town has ties to the early sixth century Christian monastery of Lann Léire which was founded by brothers St. Furudran and St. Baothan. The monastery, which was located approximately where today Dunleer's Church of Ireland church is now located, suffered numerous attacks over its history and was finally burned to the ground in 1148. After a period of ruin, the Norman family of De Audley settled the area about thirty years later.

In 1513, John Barnewall was knighted and received large grants of land in the Dunleer area, including the manor of Dunleer. It is possible that it was at this time that the settlement became known as "Dún" Leire. While it is not determined when the name changed from "Lann Léire" to "Dún Léire", there is a reference to "the ville of Dún Leire" in records dating from 1227. The town was raised to the status of a "manor" at this time. Dunleer was subsequently granted a Market Town Charter in 1252, with the right to hold a Fair and Markets at various times.

Dunleer is the principal town in the former Barony of Ferrard, and was granted an enhanced charter by King Charles II in 1671 to hold markets and fairs. This was followed by a Royal Charter in 1678 establishing Dunleer as a municipal corporation (town borough council). The corporation had 12 members (burgesses), and annually elected a mayor, known as "sovereign" of the borough. It was the very last borough to be established in Ireland.

The constituency of Dunleer, at one time, also elected two members of parliament to the old Irish House of Commons, which was abolished by the Act of Union in 1801. After the Act of Union between the English and Irish House of Commons, there was very little business for the corporation to do. It last convened in 1811.

In 2023, Taoiseach Leo Varadkar visited the area.

== Demographics ==
Dunleer's population grew from 1,104 to 1,822 inhabitants between the 1991 and 2016 census. As of the 2022 census, it had grown further, to 2,143 inhabitants.

Dunleer's proximity to Drogheda, Ardee, Dundalk, and its location as a crossroads on the main north–south economic corridor of Ireland, have contributed to its growth.

== Industry ==
Dunleer has been a centre of industry from the 17th century, and previously had three water-powered mills. Rosevale; which was a flax mill (location of today's Glen Dimplex on the Barn Road), Skibbolmore; which was a steel pin manufacturing mill (later converted to flour milling and in 2021 restored as a house), and Glebe Mill (operating since 1698) which still produces stone ground flour in small amounts from time to time for the artisan trade.

Dunleer has also been a centre of domestic appliance manufacturing since the late 1930s. As of the 21st century, the area is home to several factories, including a GlenDimplex facility.

== Education ==
Dunleer is served by several schools, all of which are co-educational facilities.

The town has three mixed gender national (primary) schools, all of which are under the trusteeship of Dunleer Parish in the Roman Catholic Archdiocese of Armagh. These include: St. Kevins National School, St. Fintan's National School, and St. Brigids National School.

Scoil Ui Mhuiri Post Primary, the only secondary school in the local area, is a mixed post-primary school which is located on Barn Road in Dunleer. As of 2024, the school had over 630 pupils enrolled. In November 2020, after a number of "major delays", a significant extension (incorporating 26 rooms, a new administration section, sensory room and outdoor area) was opened at the school. This extension replaced a number of prefabs which had surrounded the school for several years.

== Amenities and community life ==
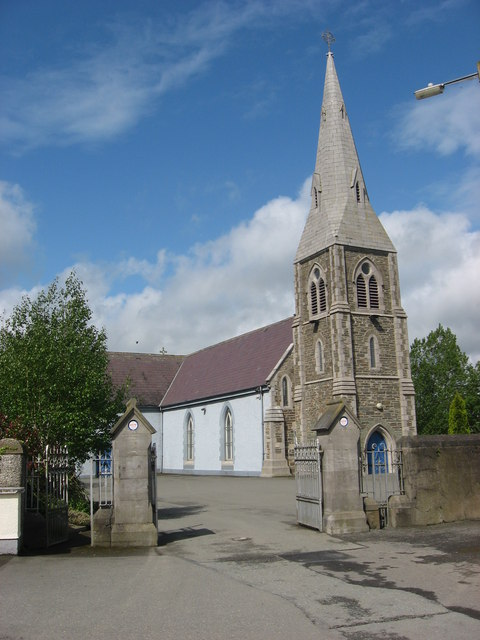
St. Brigid's Church, in Dunleer dates to the early 19th century

Dunleer has a Roman Catholic church (St. Brigid's) and a Church of Ireland church (Church of Saint Brethan and Saint Frethan). There is also a community library which is located in a former bank.

The Market House of Dunleer reopened in July 2014. It is used as a civic centre in Dunleer, and is a civic body established by the Dunleer Community Development Board, acting as trustees of the building.

Dunleer has a number of community groups, including the Dunleer Tidy Towns committee. Represented by the Tidy Towns committee, Dunleer came second in the All-Ireland "small towns" category of the 2017 Pride of Place competition, and won both the Leinster and All-Ireland "small town" awards at the 2017 event.

== Sport ==
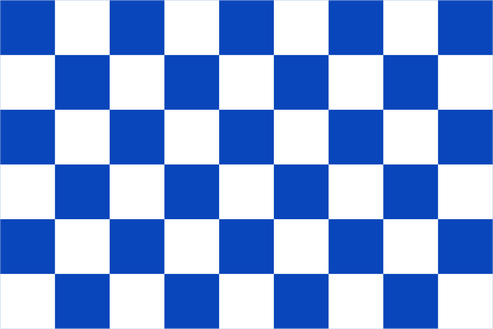
Colours of Lann Léire's GAA club

Dunleer is home to Lann Léire GFC, the town's only Gaelic football club.

The local athletics club, Dunleer Athletic Club (Dunleer AC), has an outdoor athletics track on the Lann Léire sports campus. The athletics club also organise the annual Rás na hÉireann International Cross Country races. The 50th such event was hosted, by Dunleer AC, at Oldbridge in County Meath on 17 February 2019.

The local Pavilion Centre has an indoor basketball arena and gym facilities.

== Transport ==
Dunleer is located adjacent to the M1 motorway to its west, and there is access to and from the M1 via three motorway interchanges (M1 Junctions 12, 13 and 14). These linkages played a part in Dunleer becoming a commuter town for those working primarily in Dublin, Drogheda and Dundalk.

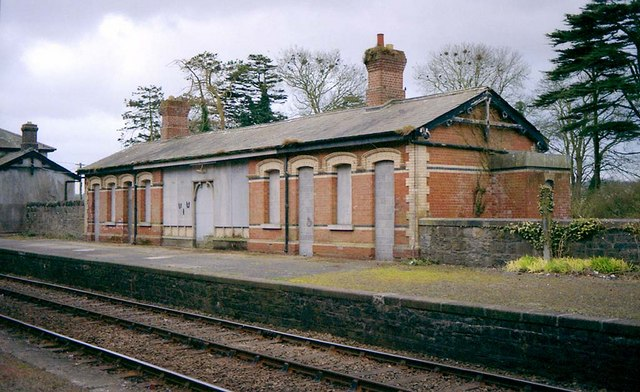
Dunleer station and platform on the Belfast-Dublin Line

The town is served by a bus service, Bus Éireann routes 100 and 100X, which link the town to Drogheda, Dundalk and Dublin.

Dunleer railway station, a disused station on the Dublin-Belfast railway line, opened on 1 April 1851, closed for goods traffic on 2 December 1974 and closed altogether on 26 November 1984. While the possibility of the station being rebuilt was referenced in local development plans published in 2009 by Louth County Council, as of 2021 the National Transport Authority reportedly had "no plans" for a station at Dunleer. The station building was refurbished in 2014.

== Annalistic references ==
- 919. Cearnach, son of Flann, Abbot of Lann-Leire, died; of whom was said:
- The torch of the plain (good in battle)/of Bregia the fair and lovely, stout his strength/Brilliance of the sun, the sun upon his cheek. Cearnach of Leire, mournful/the loss of him.
