= R801 road (Ireland) =

Road in Ireland

R801 road
- Bóthar R801
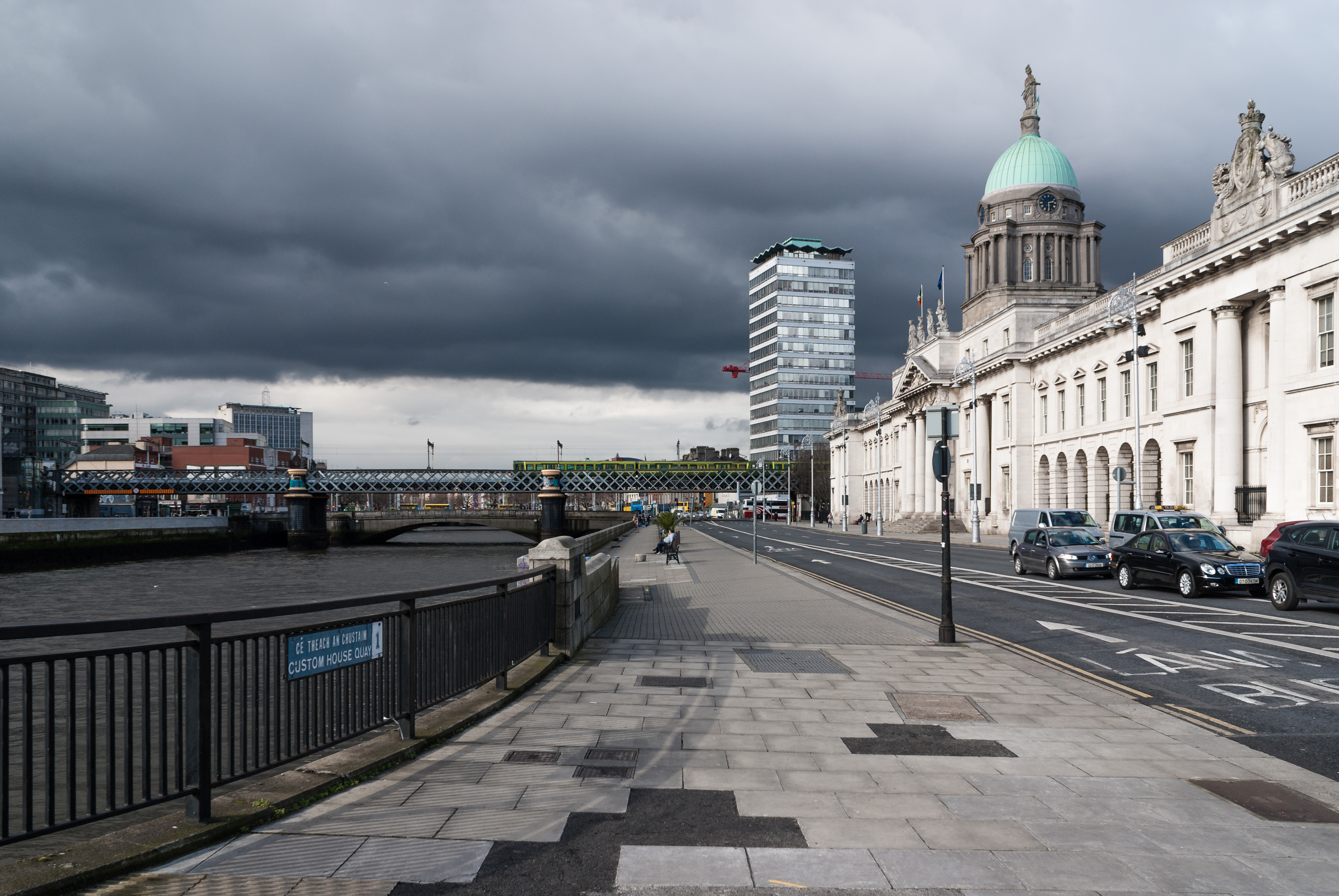
- Custom House Quay, on the R801

Route information
- Length: 1.9 km (1.2 mi)

Location
- Country: Ireland
- Primary destinations: Dublin; R105 (Beresford Place); Custom House Quay; North Wall Quay; Crosses Royal Canal; R131 (East Wall Road)

Highway system
- Roads in Ireland; Motorways; Primary; Secondary; Regional

The R801 road is a regional road in Dublin, Ireland.

The official definition of the R801 from the Roads Act 1993 (Classification of Regional Roads) Order 2006 states:

R801: North Wall, Dublin

Between its junction with R105 at Beresford Place and its junction with R131 at East Wall Road via Custom House Quay and North Wall Quay all in the city of Dublin.

The road is 1.9 kilometres (1.2 mi) long.

== See also ==
- Roads in Ireland
- Regional road
