= Sandymount Avenue =

Road in Dublin, Ireland

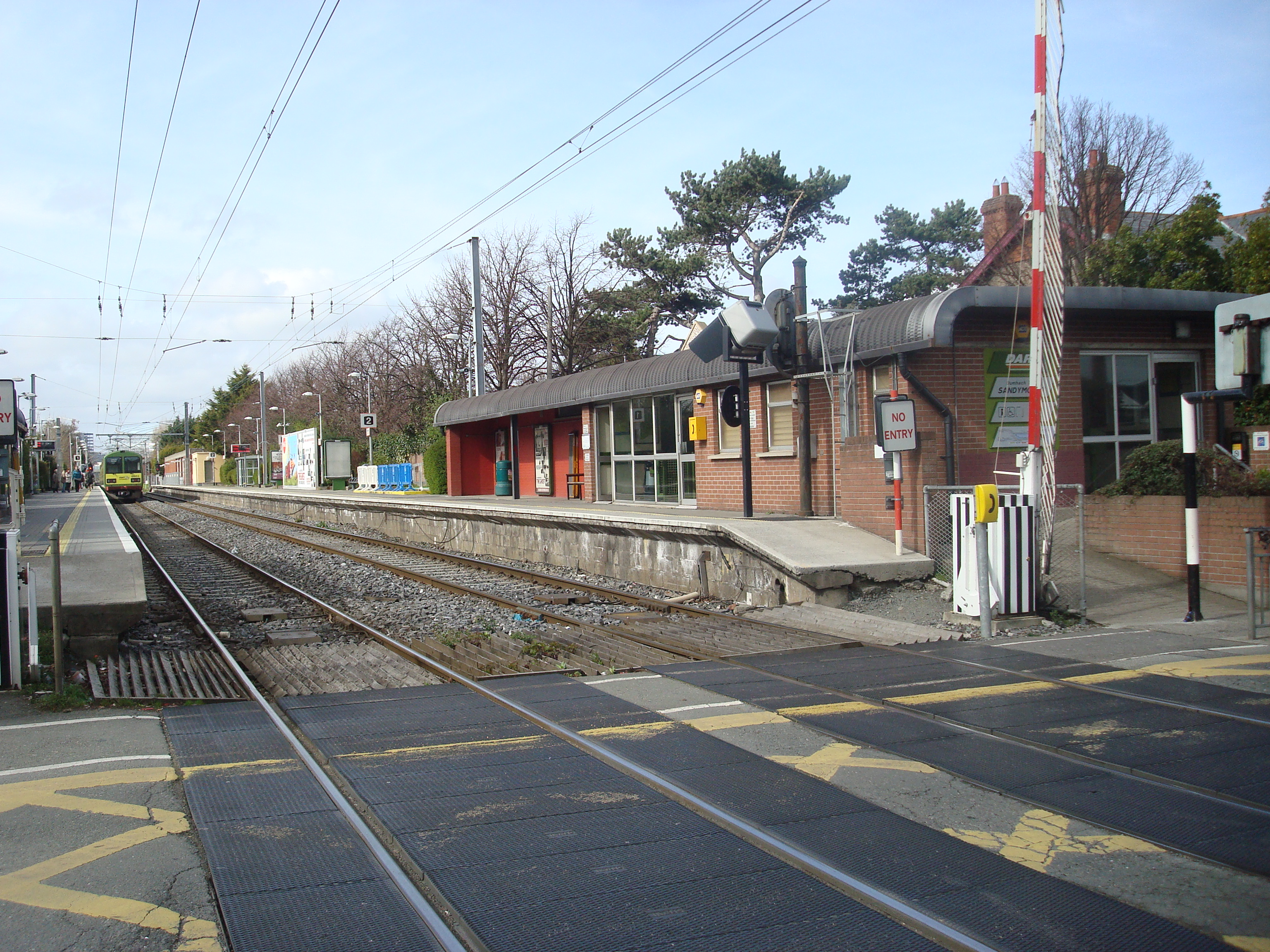
- Level crossing at Sandymount railway station where Sandymount Avenue crosses the DART line

- Location within Dublin
- Native name: Ascaill Dhumhach Thrá (Irish)
- Namesake: Sandymount
- Length: 750 m (2,460 ft)
- Width: 12 metres (39 ft)
- Location: Sandymount, Dublin, Ireland
- Postal code: D04
- Coordinates: 53.328363°N 6.219648°W
- west end: Merrion Road
- east end: Gilford Road

Other
- Known for: W.B. Yeats birthplace

Sandymount Avenue (Irish: Ascaill Dhumhach Thrá) joins Merrion Road to Gilford Road in Sandymount, Dublin. Sandymount railway station is located roughly halfway along it at a level crossing. It is a residential area.

W.B. Yeats, the Nobel Prize-winning poet, was born here. A plaque now marks his birthplace.

== See also ==
- List of streets and squares in Dublin
