= R804 road (Ireland) =

Road in Ireland

R804 road
- Bóthar R804
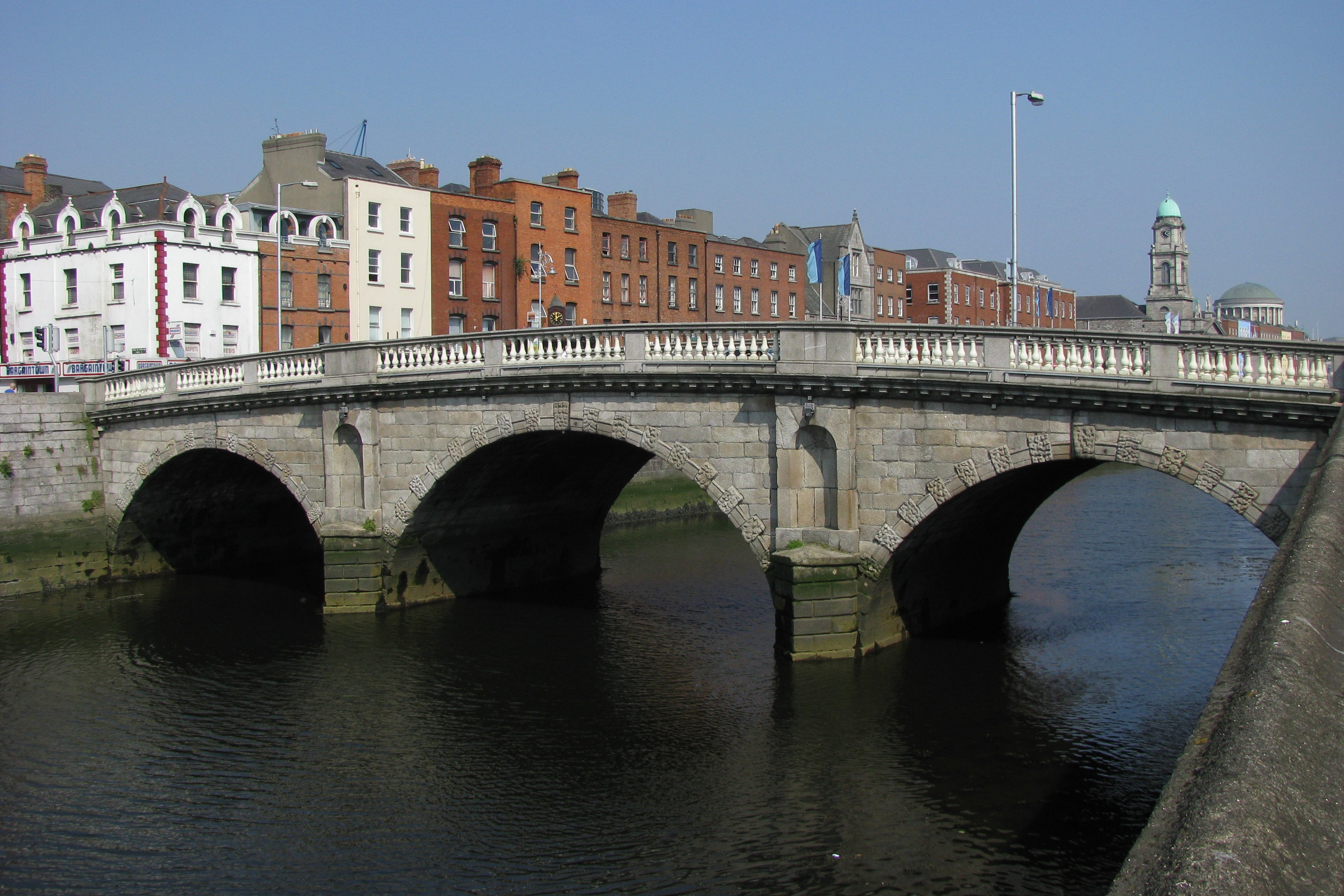
- Mellows Bridge carries the R804 across the River Liffey

Location
- Country: Ireland
- Primary destinations: Dublin

Highway system
- Roads in Ireland; Motorways; Primary; Secondary; Regional

The R804 road is a regional road in Dublin, Ireland.

The official definition of the R804 from the Roads Act, 1993 (Classification of Regional Roads) Order, 2012 states:

R804: Granby Row - Cork Street, Dublin

Between its junction with R132 at Granby Row and its junction with R110 at Cork Street via Dorset Street Upper, Bolton Street, North King Street, Queen Street, Liam Mellowes Bridge, Bridgefoot Street, Thomas Court and Marrowbone Lane all in the city of Dublin.

== See also ==
- Roads in Ireland
- National primary road
- Regional road
