= R811 road (Ireland) =

Road in Ireland

R811 road
- Bóthar R811
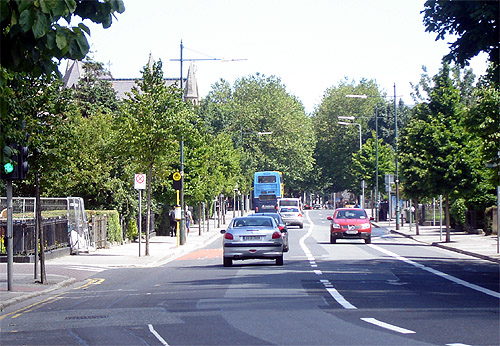
- South Circular Road in Portobello, on the R811

Location
- Country: Ireland
- Primary destinations: Dublin

Highway system
- Roads in Ireland; Motorways; Primary; Secondary; Regional

The R811 road (also known as South Circular Road) is a regional road in Dublin, Ireland.

The official definition of the R811 from the Roads Act, 1993 (Classification of Regional Roads) Order, 2012 states:

R811: South Circular Road, Dublin

Between its junction with R138 at Leeson Street Lower and its junction with R114 at Harcourt Street via Adelaide Road, Harcourt Road (and via Harcourt Street, Hatch Street Upper and Earlsfort Terrace) all in the city of Dublin and between its junction with R114 at Richmond Street South and its junction with R111 at Suir Road via Haddington Street and South Circular Road all in the city of Dublin.

== See also ==
- Roads in Ireland
- Regional road
