= R121 road (Ireland) =

Road in Ireland

R121 road
- Bóthar R121

Location
- Country: Ireland

Highway system
- Roads in Ireland; Motorways; Primary; Secondary; Regional

The R121 road is a regional road in south County Dublin and Fingal, Ireland.

The official description of the R121 from the Roads Act 1993 (Classification of Regional Roads) Order 2012 reads:

R121: Lucan - Blanchardstown - Skephubble, County Dublin

Between its junction with R835 at Leixlip Road in the town of Lucan in the county of South Dublin and its junction with R122 at Skephubble in the county of Fingal via Main Street (and via Dispensary Lane) in the town of Lucan; and Lucan Bridge in the county of South Dublin: Laraghcon, Westmanstown, Barberstown Cross, Woodwall Road, Luttrellstown Cross, Clonsilla Road, Blanchardstown Road South, Blanchardstown Road North, Cruisrath Road, Tyrrelstown Road, Hollywoodrath, Ward Lower and Newpark all in the county of Fingal.

== See also ==
- Roads in Ireland
- National primary road
- National secondary road
- Regional road
