= Clonskeagh Bridge =

Bridge over the River Dodder in Ireland

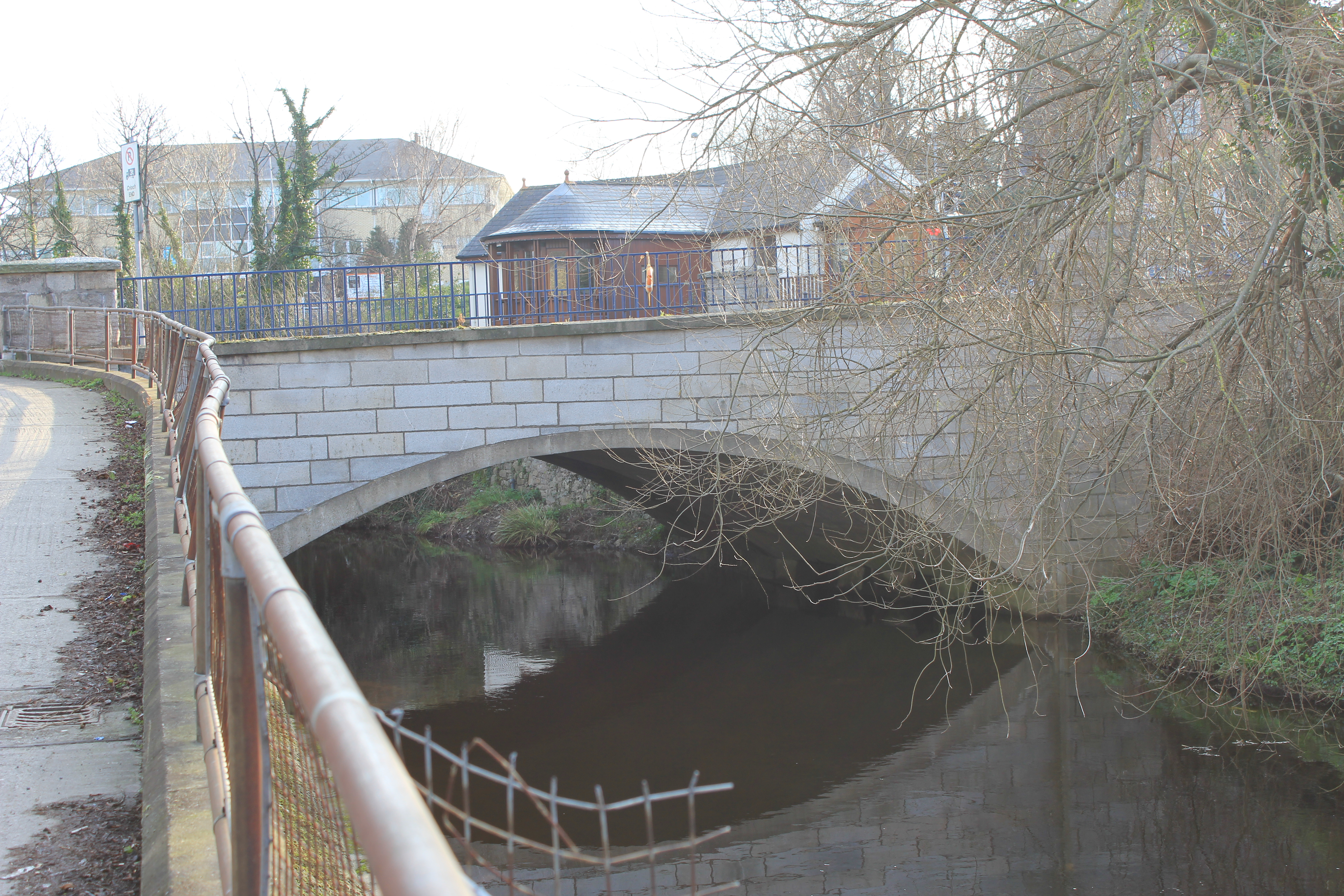
- Clonskeagh Bridge seen from upstream on the left bank.
- Coordinates: 53.313538°N 6.238288°W
- Crosses: River Dodder

Characteristics
- Material: Stone
- No. of spans: 1

History
- Construction end: Unknown

Clonskeagh Bridge is a bridge over the River Dodder in Dublin, Ireland. The bridge is on the Clonskeagh Road and forms part of the administrative boundary between Dublin City Council and Dún Laoghaire-Rathdown County Council
