= Dorset Street, Dublin =

Street in Dublin, Ireland

Dorset Street
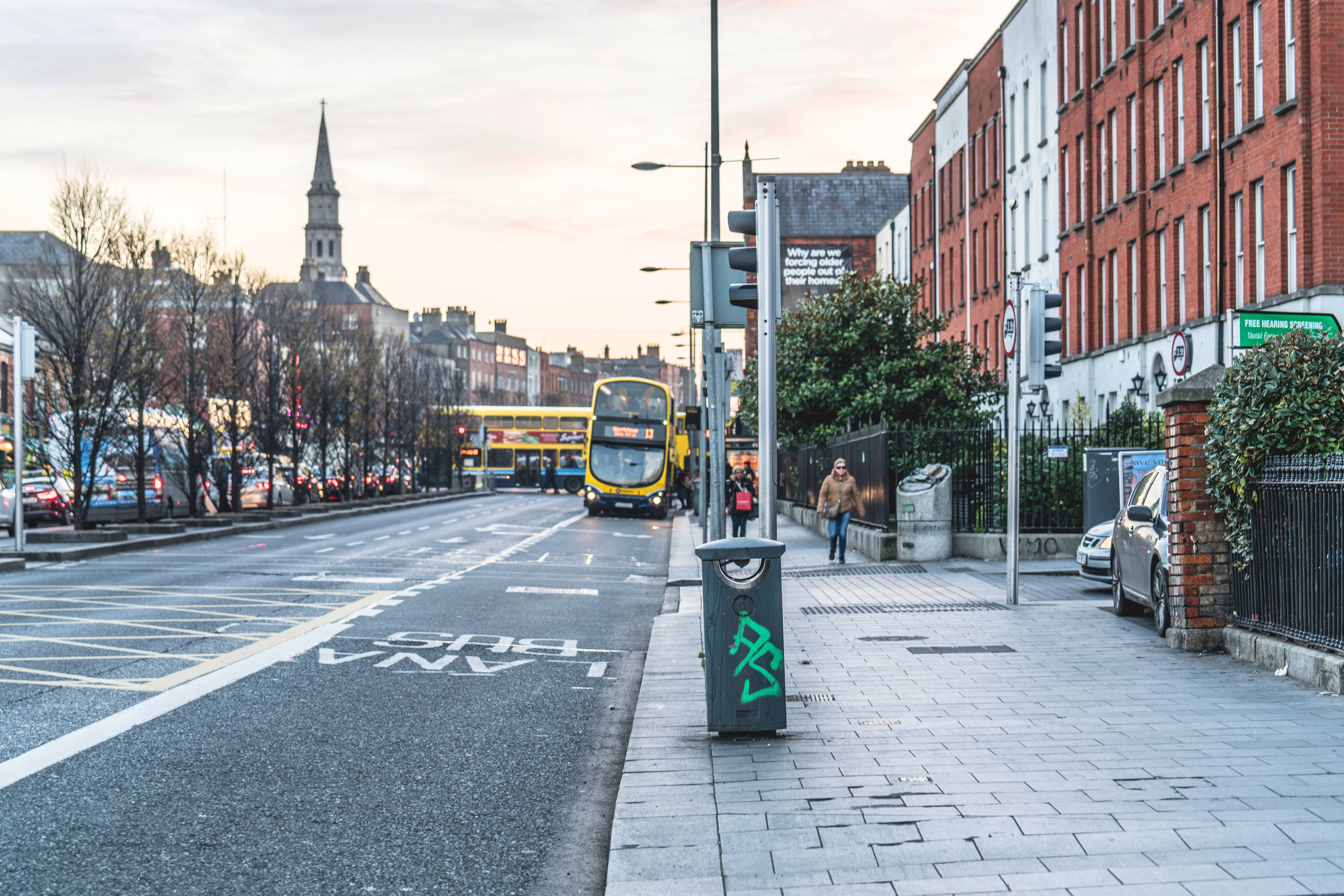
- A view of Dorset Street with the steeple of the neoclassical St.George's Church in the distance

- Location within Central Dublin
- Native name: Sráid Dorset (Irish)
- Former name: Drumcondra Lane
- Namesake: Lionel Sackville, 1st Duke of Dorset
- Length: 1.1 km (0.68 mi)
- Width: 21 metres (69 ft)
- Location: Dublin, Ireland
- Postal code: D01
- Coordinates: 53°21′24″N 6°15′53″W
- southwest end: Dominick Street, Bolton Street
- northeast end: Drumcondra Road

Other
- Known for: cafés and restaurants

Dorset Street (/dɔːrˈsɛt/; Sráid Dorset in Irish) is an important thoroughfare on the north side of Dublin, Ireland, and was originally part of the Slíghe Chualann, Dublin's ancient road to the north that crossed the bridging point of the River Liffey where Church Street is today. Subsequently, yet prior to the street being given its current name in the 18th century, the road was known as Drumcondra Lane and was shown on maps as such. It is divided into Dorset Street Lower (northeast end) and Dorset Street Upper (southwest end).

== Location and layout ==
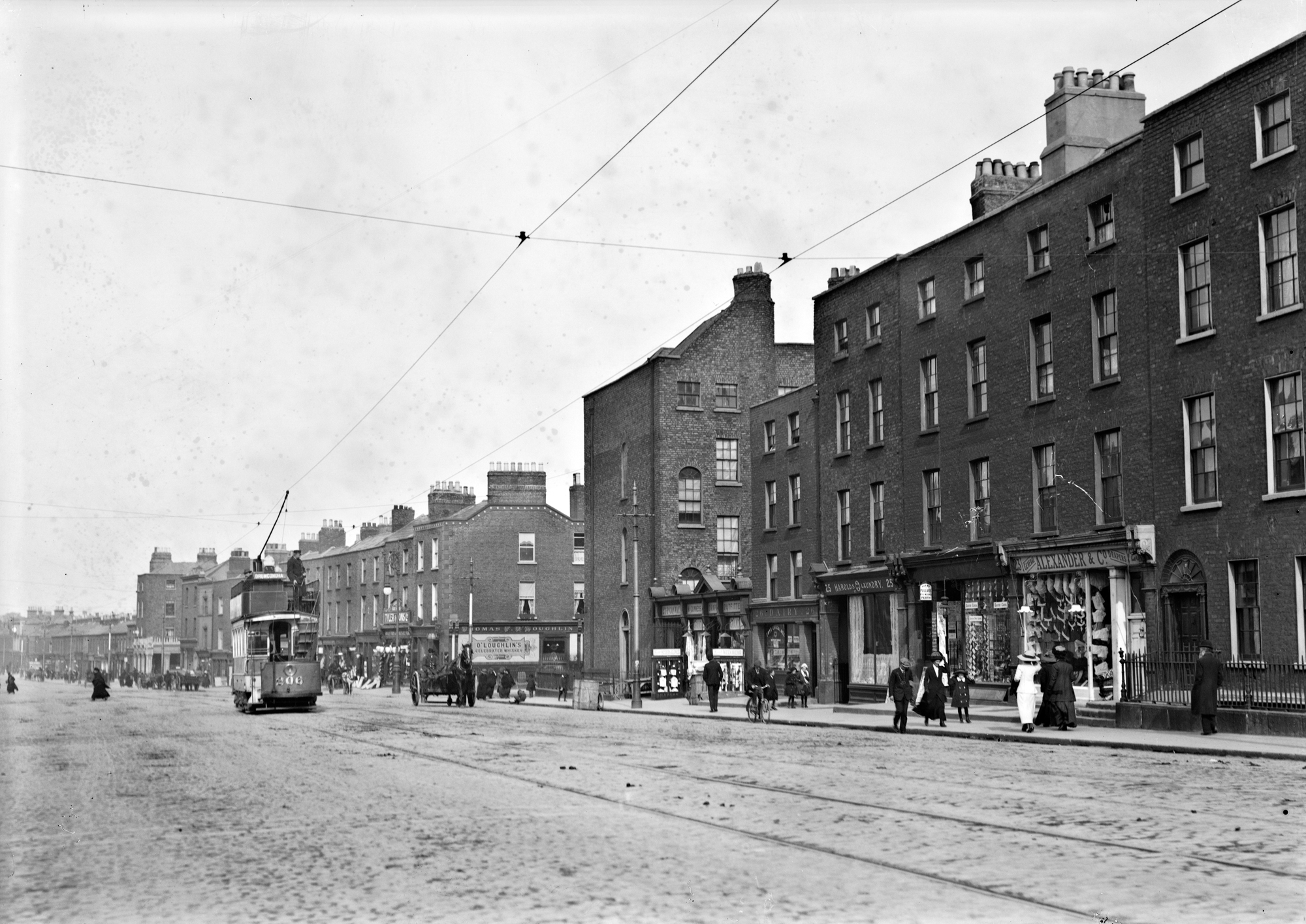
View of Dorset Street, c. 1913.

The street runs northeast from Abbey Street and Bolton Street at Dominick Street junction, north of Parnell Square and Mountjoy Square, and leads into Drumcondra Road at Binn's Bridge on the Royal Canal. It makes up part of the most common route from Dublin Airport to the city centre, and the R132 regional road follows Dorset Street for part of its route. It meets the R135 route at the junctions with Blessington Street, location of the Blessington Street Basin, and St. Mary's Place; other major roads feeding onto this spine street include North Circular Road, Gardiner Street, Eccles Street, North Frederick Street, and Granby Row.

Physically the street rises up from the Liffey valley at its southwestern end to its apex at roughly where it meets with Blessington and North Frederick Streets; proceeding north-west the street slopes down again on the approach to Binn's Bridge at the Royal Canal.

Some early Georgian houses are dotted along the street, primarily identifiable by the stone Gibbsian doorcase entrances, and close to the crossroads with Blessington and North Frederick Streets. Much of the street redeveloped during the Victorian era, with a number of significant buildings built, such as the Gothic style stone-built Dominican priory, designed by J. L. Robinson in 1884–87 at the corner of Dominick Street, while across from it is the red brick Italianate former fire station, designed by C. J. McCarthy and completed in 1903. Much of the street consists of vernacular Victorian terraces, with shops opening straight onto footpaths at ground-floor level.

During the latter part of the twentieth century, stretches of the street were again redeveloped by Dublin Corporation for social housing flat complexes near Dominick Street.

== Naming and pronunciation ==
Until 1728, the street was marked on maps as Drumcondra Lane. Dorset Street was named after Lionel Cranfield Sackville, 1st Duke of Dorset, the Lord Lieutenant of Ireland in 1756. While the English county of Dorset is pronounced with the first syllable stressed, "Dorset Street" is pronounced locally (by Northsiders) as /dɔːrˈsɛt/ Street, with emphasis on the second syllable of "Dorset".

== History ==
=== St. Joseph's Place Housing Scheme ===
St Joseph's Place housing scheme has been in planning for many years, which date back as far as 1896. The scheme contained 80 units, with a high density of 30 dwellings per acre. The area named "White's Lane" required major improvements, as the houses were simply inhabitable by means of spatial planning, cleanliness, conveniences, sanitization and many more basic human needs that were desperately needed. Hence under the Housing of the Working Class Act, 1890, the improvement scheme for this area was published in October, but by June there was still only partial approval for the loan in order to commence construction. This was due to the displacement of tenants during this time who were sent to areas such as Lurgan Street, Linenhall Street, and Church Street but would not stay in these areas during the construction period for various reasons such as costs and poor sanitation in the houses, and the following year, tenants then began to request compensation for their displacement.

The scheme was then outlined by the City surveyor, Mr Harty, who proposed that the land be completely cleared and constructed an entirely new scheme. This plan consisted of the construction of 80 cottages. Each of them is to be one storey high, and a site to construct a boys' national school. This scheme came to life in July 1896 and has not greatly changed since. St. Joseph's Place still consists of these classic one-storey cottages.

== Historic residents ==
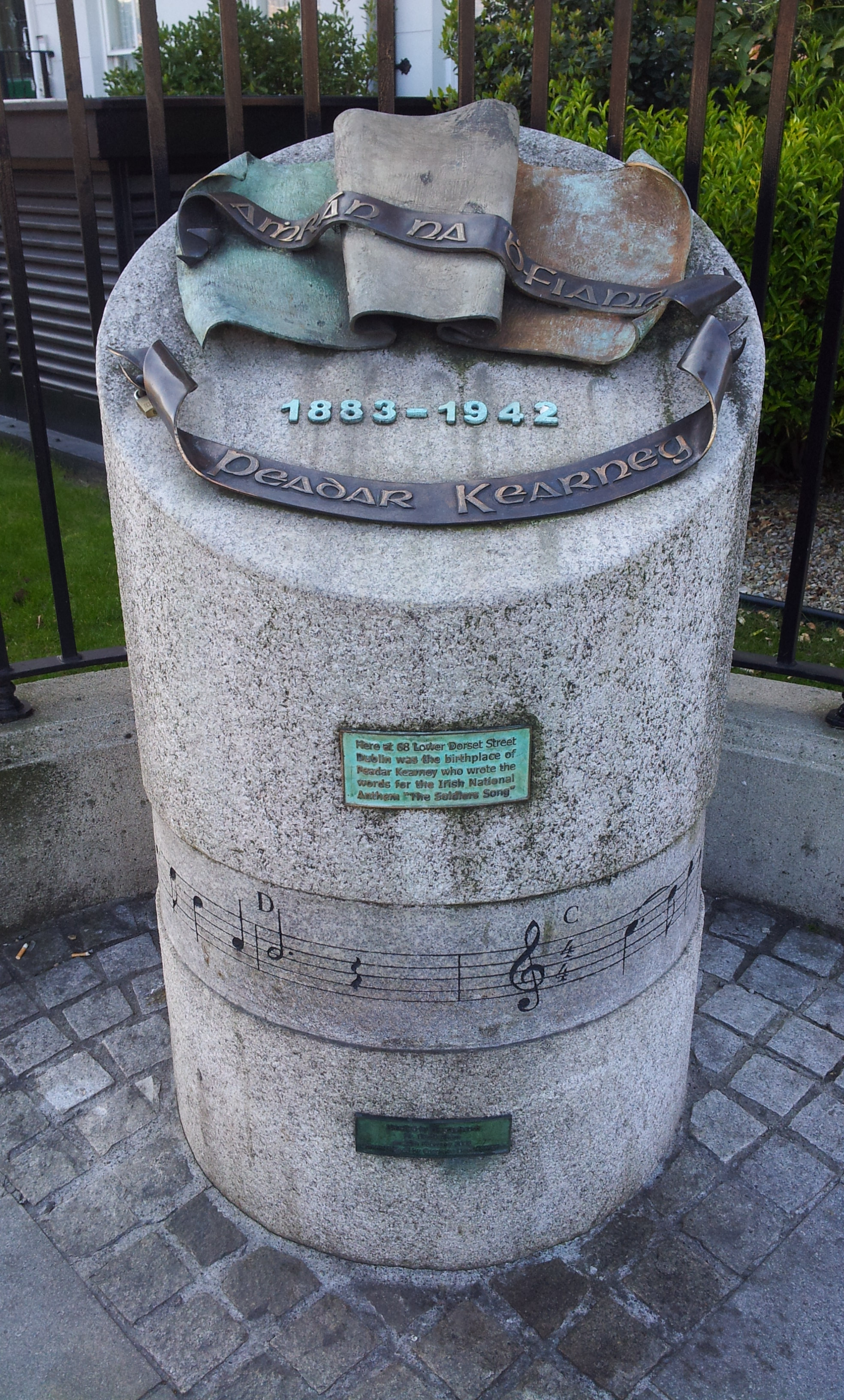
Monument to Peadar Kearney, Lower Dorset St.

- Irish author Seán O'Casey and Irish dramatist and educator Thomas Sheridan were born on this street.
- Seán O'Casey was born at number 85, since demolished and replaced by a branch of the Bank of Ireland (now disused), his family having previously occupied numbers 6 and 23½ before moving there. At the time, the street was considered to be a reasonably fashionable location in Dublin.
- Playwright, Westminster Parliament member, and son of Thomas, Richard Brinsley Sheridan was born on this street at number 12 in 1751; Brinsley Sheridan's works include The Critics and A School for Scandal.
- No 16 - site of - was the residence of United Irishman Napper Tandy in 1779
- No 68 - site of - home to Peadar Kearney (1883–1942); Songwriter and author of the national anthem, "The Soldier's Song", also known in Irish as Amhrán na bhFiann. Kearney was born at this address, and by trade became a house painter and theatre set decorator, as too did his more famous nephew, the playwright Brendan Behan, who also lived nearby at Russell Street.

== Today ==
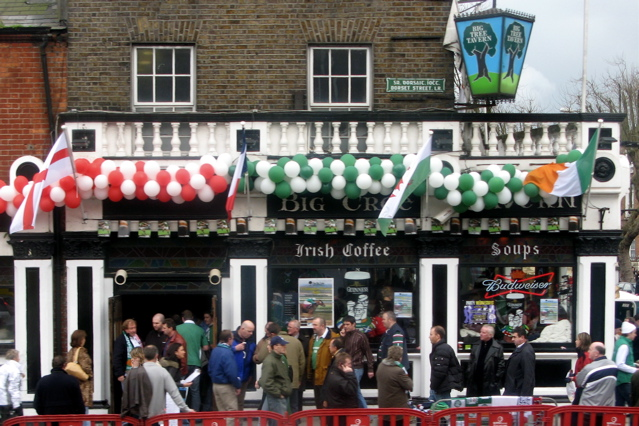
The Big Tree pub on Dorset Street

The street has been improved at its northern end with new trees and lighting in the 2010s. A Maldron hotel was built in conjunction with Senator Donie Cassidy now sits on the site of the former National Wax Museum (and before that Plaza Cinema and Bethesda Chapel). Road engineering by Dublin City Council, designed primarily to facilitate cars. The street features a number of pubs, including Joxer Daly's, as referenced by Seán O'Casey in Juno and the Paycock, fast food outlets, an assortment of small retail units, and apartments and small offices.

The Dorest Street flats on Upper Dorset Street were demolished in October 2024 to make way for a redevelopment of the site for more social housing. The majority of the flats had been vacant for a decade and had attracted anti-social behaviour.

== See also ==
- List of streets and squares in Dublin
- St. Anne's Road Pocket Park
