= R802 road (Ireland) =

Road in Ireland

R802 road
- Bóthar R802
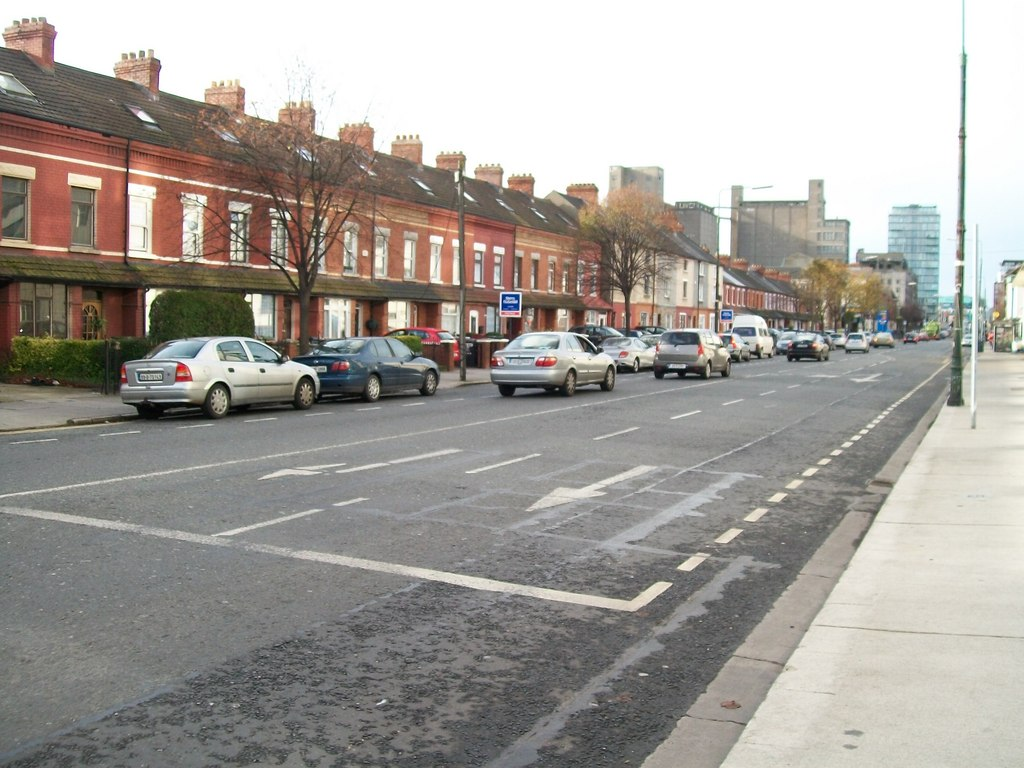
- Ringsend Road, on the R802

Location
- Country: Ireland
- Primary destinations: Dublin

Highway system
- Roads in Ireland; Motorways; Primary; Secondary; Regional

The R802 road is a regional road in Dublin, Ireland.

The official definition of the R802 from the Roads Act, 1993 (Classification of Regional Roads) Order, 2012 states:

R802: Dorset Street - Bath Road, Dublin

Between its junction with R132 at Dorset Street Lower and its junction with R105 at Beresford Place via Gardiner Street Upper, Mountjoy Square West, Gardiner Street Middle and Gardiner Street Lower all in the city of Dublin

and

between its junction with R105 at Georges Quay and its junction with R111 at Church Avenue via Moss Street, Townsend Street, Sandwith Street, Pearse Street, Ringsend Road, Bridge Street, Irishtown road and Pembroke Street (and via Bath Street) all in the city of Dublin

and

between its junction with itself at Sandwith Street and its junction with R118 at Westland Row via Pearse Street all in the city of Dublin

and

between its junction with R118 at Pearse Street and its junction with R105 at Eden Quay via Tara Street and Butt Bridge all in the city of Dublin.

== See also ==
- Roads in Ireland
- Regional road
