= M1 motorway (Republic of Ireland) =

Motorway connecting Dublin and the Northern Ireland border

M1 motorway
- Mótarbhealach M1
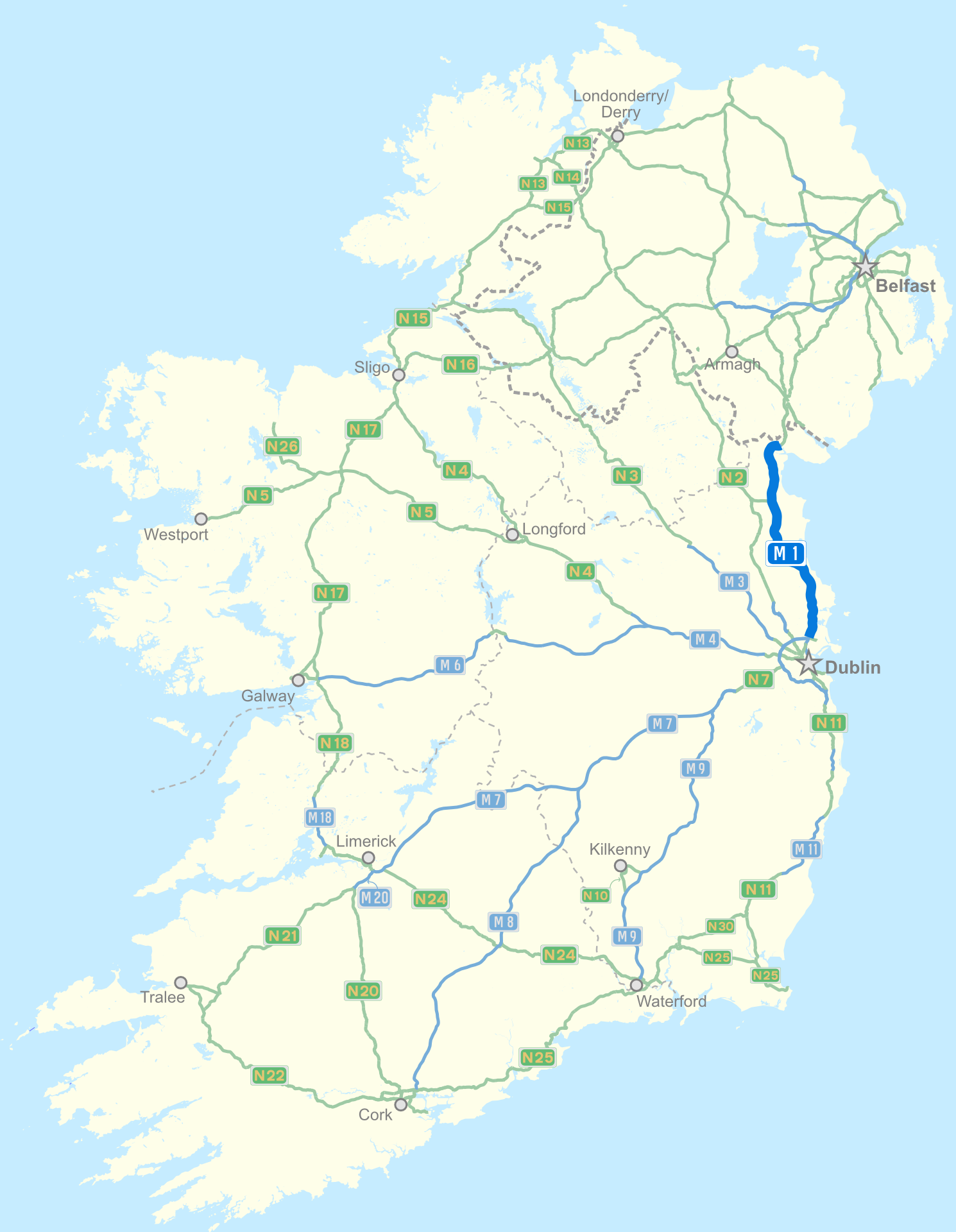
- Clickable image

Route information
- Part of E01
- Length: 87 km (54 mi)
- Existed: 1983–present
- History: Completed 1983–2005; Stages: Santry Bypass: 1983; Airport Motorway: 1985; Dunleer Bypass: 1993; Balbriggan Bypass: 1998; Dunleer to Dundalk: 2001; Drogheda Bypass: 2003; Airport to Balbriggan: 2003; Dundalk Bypass: 2005

Major junctions
- South end: Dublin (Turnapin)
- J1 → M50 motorway J10 → N51 road J14 → N33 road J17 → N53 road
- North end: Ballymascanlon

Location
- Country: Ireland
- Primary destinations: Dublin Airport, Swords, Balbriggan, Drogheda, Dundalk

Highway system
- Roads in Ireland; Motorways; Primary; Secondary; Regional

The M1 motorway (Irish: Mótarbhealach M1) is a motorway in Ireland. It forms the large majority of the N1 national primary road connecting Dublin towards Belfast along the east of the island of Ireland. The route heads north via Swords, Drogheda and Dundalk to the Northern Irish border just south of Newry in County Armagh, where it joins the A1 road and further on, the M1 motorway in Northern Ireland. It also forms a significant part of the road connection between Dublin and the Northern Irish cities of Newry, and Lisburn. The route is part of European route E01.

== Route ==
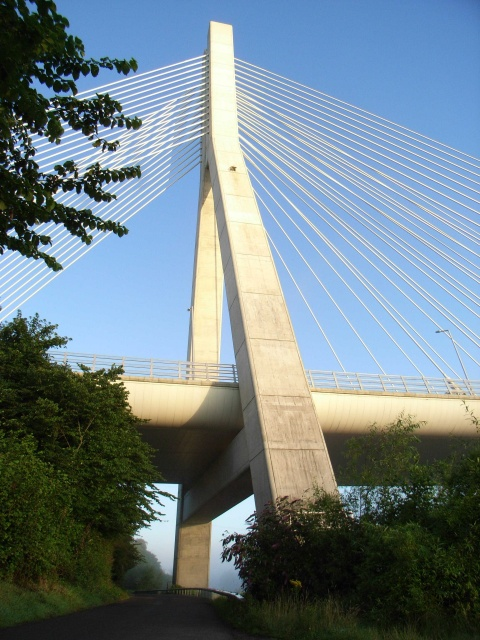
The Mary McAleese Boyne Valley Bridge carries the Drogheda bypass across the river Boyne.

Almost the entire length of the N1 has been upgraded to motorway standard and is designated the M1 motorway. It runs from the Junction 3 of the M50 ring road in Dublin, past Cloghran, Swords, Balbriggan, Stamullen, Drogheda, Dunleer, Castlebellingham and Dundalk before ending at Ballymascanlon north of Dundalk. It by-passes many towns and villages through which the N1 travelled. The original N1 route now forms the R132. At Ballymascanlon, it becomes the N1 dual carriageway and continues to the border with Northern Ireland. The motorway section of the N1 uses the M1 designation. Small yellow route markers along the motorway route also read N1.

The motorway was built in several stages as short disconnected bypasses, replacing the original N1 route. The first section opened (in 1983) was from Whitehall to Coolock Lane followed (in 1985) by the Airport Motorway between Whitehall and Dublin Airport, only the third section of motorway opened in the Republic. 1980s style direction signs were still intact on this route up until 2006. Part of this original M1 is now a spur to Dublin Airport, while another part between Whitehall to the Port Tunnel portals is now narrowed to two+one lanes (although still grade-separated) as a result of the Dublin Port Tunnel work.

There are toll fees for use of the motorway between junctions 7 and 10, the section which forms the Drogheda bypass. Work began in 2004 on a bypass of Dundalk, and was completed three months ahead of schedule in 2005, extending the motorway to just south of the border.

Construction finished in 2007 on a cross-border stretch of grade-separated dual-carriageway linking the northern end of the M1 with the A1 near Newry in County Armagh. This was opened to traffic on 2 August 2007. Its length is 14 km (8.7 mi), 4.6 km (2.9 mi) north of the border and 9.4 km (5.8 mi) south of the border. This allows traffic to flow freely from Dublin Port on motorway/dual-carriageway standard road to the Hillsborough Roundabout, located south of Lisburn.

A 120 km/h (75 mph) speed limit applies on most of the M1, the exception being a 100 km/h (62 mph) limit between Junction 1 and Junction 2 at Dublin Airport. The lower speed limit is credited to the much higher volumes of traffic on this stretch. Fingal County Council raised the limit on this section to 100 km/h (62 mph) in June 2022.

== Junctions ==
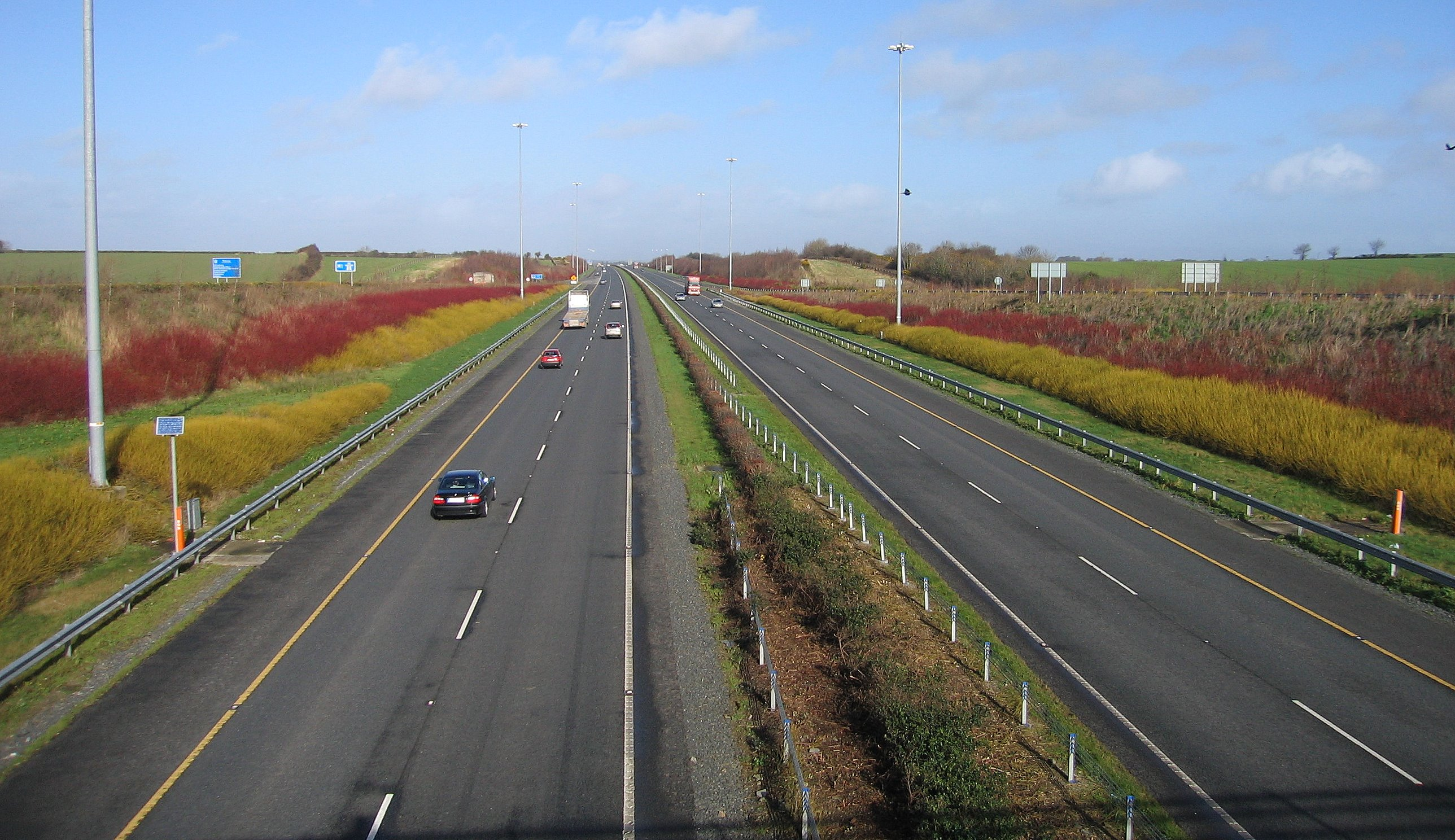
M1 northbound in County Louth

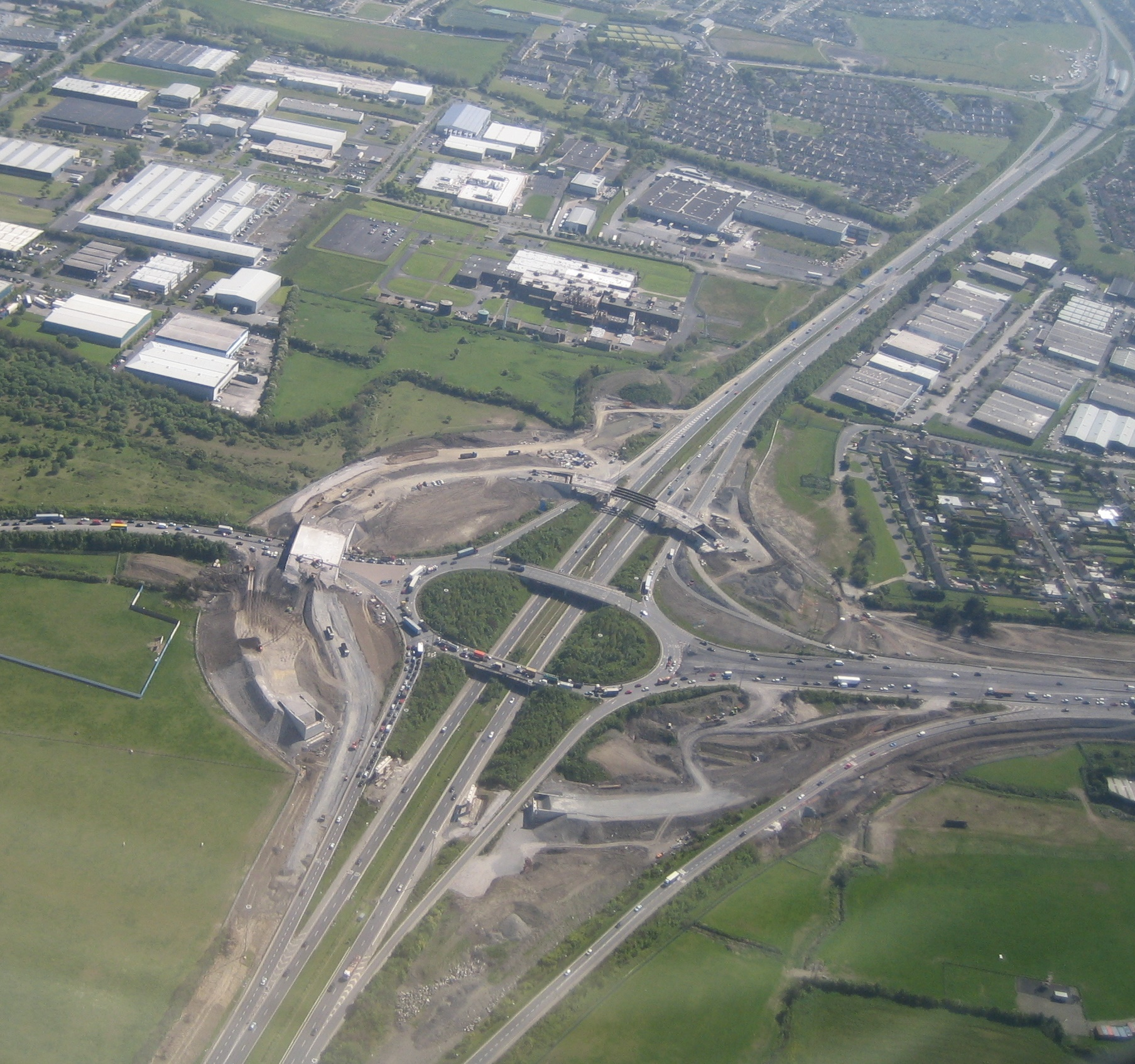
The M1 from the air, at its junction with the M50 near Dublin, Ireland

As of 2011 all junctions feature their number on road signs.

County	km	mi	Junction	Destinations	Notes
County Dublin	0.5	0.3	1	R139 – Malahide M50 – Southbound	Continues as M50 towards Dublin Port and city centre.
County Dublin	2.5	1.6	2	R132 – Airport	
County Dublin	4.5	2.8	3	R125 – Ashbourne, Swords	Northbound exit and southbound entrance only.
County Dublin	8.5	5.3	4	R132 – Skerries, Rush, Donabate (northbound); Swords, Malahide, Donabate (southbound)	
County Dublin	15.5	9.6	Lusk Service Area		
County Dublin	18.5	11.5	5	R132 – Balbriggan South (northbound); Rush, Lusk (southbound)	
County Dublin	22.5	14	6	R122 – Balbriggan, Naul (northbound); Balbriggan, Skerries, Naul (southbound)	
County Meath	27.5	17.1	7	R132 – Julianstown, Drogheda (South) (northbound); Julianstown, Balbriggan (North) (southbound)	Stamullen
County Meath	33	20.5	M1 Toll		
County Meath	37.5	23.3	8	R152 – Duleek	Northbound exit and southbound entrance only.
County Meath	39	24.2	9	L1601 – Drogheda, Donore (northbound); Drogheda, Donore, Duleek (southbound)	Toll at northbound entrance and southbound exit. Southbound entrance accessible via Junction 8 which is connected to J9 via link road.
River Boyne	41	25.5	Mary McAleese Boyne Valley Bridge		
County Louth	42	26.1	10	N51 – Drogheda, Navan, Collon	Drogheda Hospital, Slane
County Louth	48	29.8	11	R132 – Monasterboice	Northbound entrance and southbound exit only.
County Louth	53	32.9	12	R169 – Dunleer, Collon	
County Louth	54.5	33.8	13	R170 – Dunleer	Northbound exit and southbound entrance only.
County Louth	57.5	35.7	14	N33 – Ardee, Derry (N2)	Letterkenny
County Louth	62.5	38.8	15	R166 – Castlebellingham, Tallanstown	
County Louth	65.5	40.7	Castlebellingham Service Area		
County Louth	70	43.5	16	N52 – Dundalk (South), Mullingar	Ardee, Rockfield, Blackrock
County Louth	76	47.2	17	N53 – Dundalk (Centre), Castleblayney	Crossmaglen
County Louth	80.5	50	18	Dundalk (North), Carlingford ([[R176 road (Ireland)|R173]])	Greenore, Ravensdale (R132). End of motorway, continues as N1.
County Louth	85	52.8	19	R174 – Ravensdale	Northbound entrance and southbound exit only.
County Louth	88	54.6	20	Carrickcarnan, Jonesborough (B113)	Northbound exit and southbound entrance only. Exit sliproad crosses border. Continues as A1 into Northern Ireland.
1.000 mi = 1.609 km; 1.000 km = 0.621 mi: Incomplete access; Tolled; Route transition

== All-Ireland route ==
The upgrade of the N1 is now complete in the Republic of Ireland, the first major route to be completely upgraded to motorway/dual carriageway standard (outside of Dublin city centre) as per the National Development Plan. The Northern Irish authorities have no plans to replace the A1 route (currently dual carriageway) with a motorway, although many junctions have now been grade separated. Currently, to drive from Dublin city centre to Belfast, one travels along the M1 (Republic of Ireland), N1, A1 and M1 (Northern Ireland).

== Motorway service areas ==
The first official on-line motorway service area in Ireland opened on the M1 on 8 September 2010, located near Lusk. A second near Castlebellingham (M1 North service area) opened on 29 September 2010. Each location has northbound and southbound facilities, with no connection across the motorway between each side. Open 24 hours a day, they provide fuel and food and are of a design similar to those found in other European countries. The service areas are run by a consortium of companies known as Superstop.

== ITS on the M1 ==
As with other sections of Irish motorways which feature variable-message signs, the M1 is also connected to an intelligent transportation system (ITS) providing real-time journey time information for motorists. The system works by recognising vehicle number plates at intervals along the motorway, and uses this information to calculate average vehicle speeds and hence travel times. Northbound, VMSs near Malahide and Balbriggan provide information on the journey times to the Drogheda (J7) and Dundalk (J16) exits. Similar signs southbound provide information on the travel time to Dublin Airport and the Dublin Port Tunnel.

== Roadside art on the M1 ==
Roadside art is funded under the Percentage For Arts Scheme where 1% of the scheme budget is allocated to roadside art with a cap of €63,000. The local authorities decide on a theme and are responsible for commissioning the work, usually by open competition. There are several examples along the M1

- The Beehives. Three corbelled beehives on the Balbriggan bypass by artists Robert McColgan and Irene Benner made of cut stone in 2001 – Inspired by the tale of St. Molach, a beekeeper.
- An Tarbh Donn, a three-metre-high (9.8-foot) bull on the Dundalk bypass by artist Micheál McKeown. Of metal mesh on a concrete base. Inspired by the Bull in the Táin Bó Cúailnge.

== See also ==
- Roads in Ireland
- Motorways in Ireland
- National secondary road
- Regional road
- List of toll roads in the Republic of Ireland
