= R803 road (Ireland) =

Road in Ireland

R803 road
- Bóthar R803
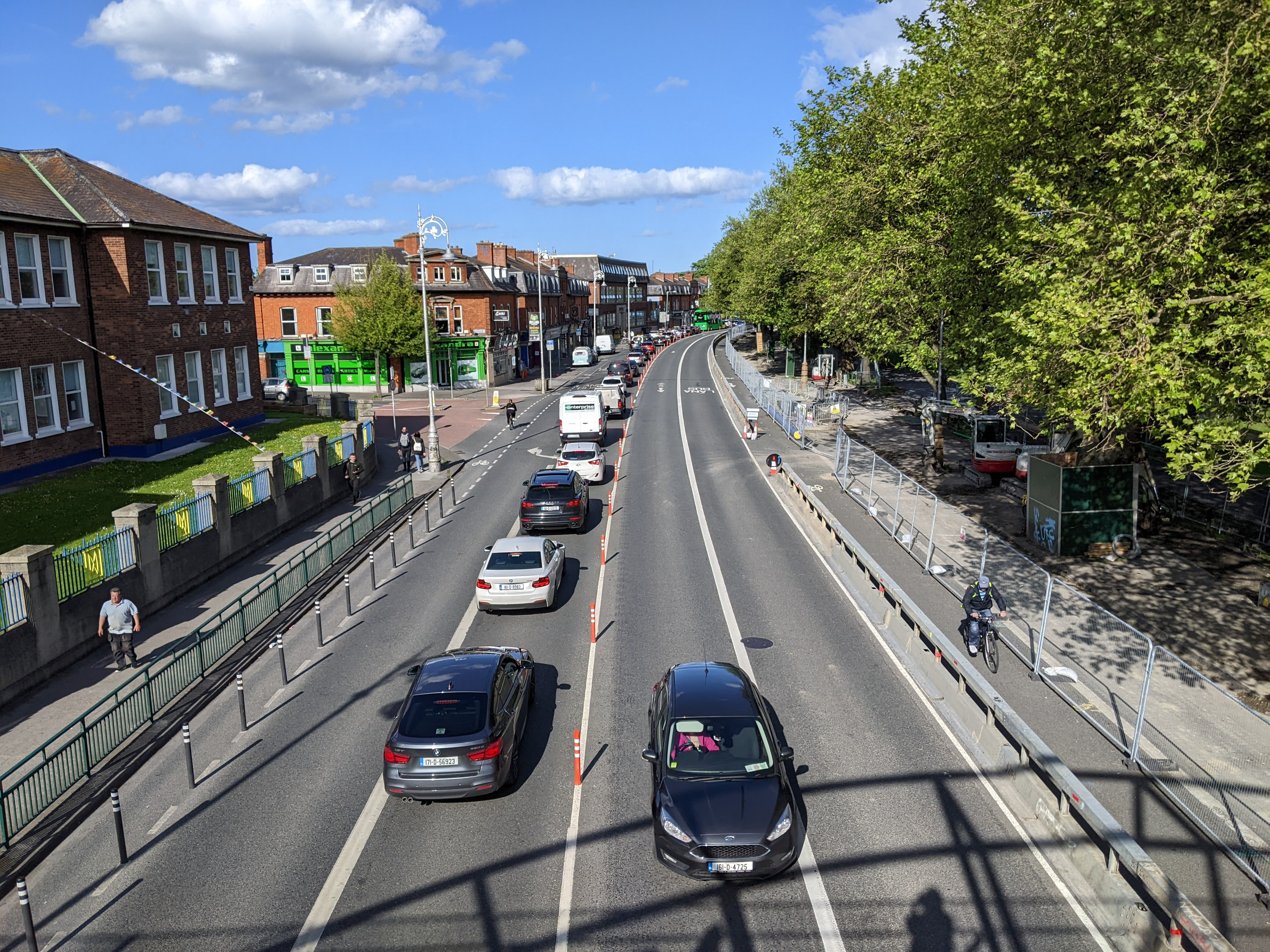
- Fairview Strand, on the R803

Location
- Country: Ireland
- Primary destinations: Dublin

Highway system
- Roads in Ireland; Motorways; Primary; Secondary; Regional

The R803 road is a regional road in Dublin, Ireland.

The official definition of the R803 from the Roads Act 1993 (Classification of Regional Roads) Order 2012 states:

R803: Summerhill - Parnell Street, Dublin

Between its junction with R105 at Annesley Bridge Road and its junction with R804 at Bolton Street via Fairview Strand, Ballybough Road, Summerhill Parade, Summerhill, Parnell Street, Ryders Row and Capel Street all in the city of Dublin.

== See also ==
- Roads in Ireland
- Regional road
