= R118 road (Ireland) =

Regional road in Ireland

R118 road
- Bóthar R118
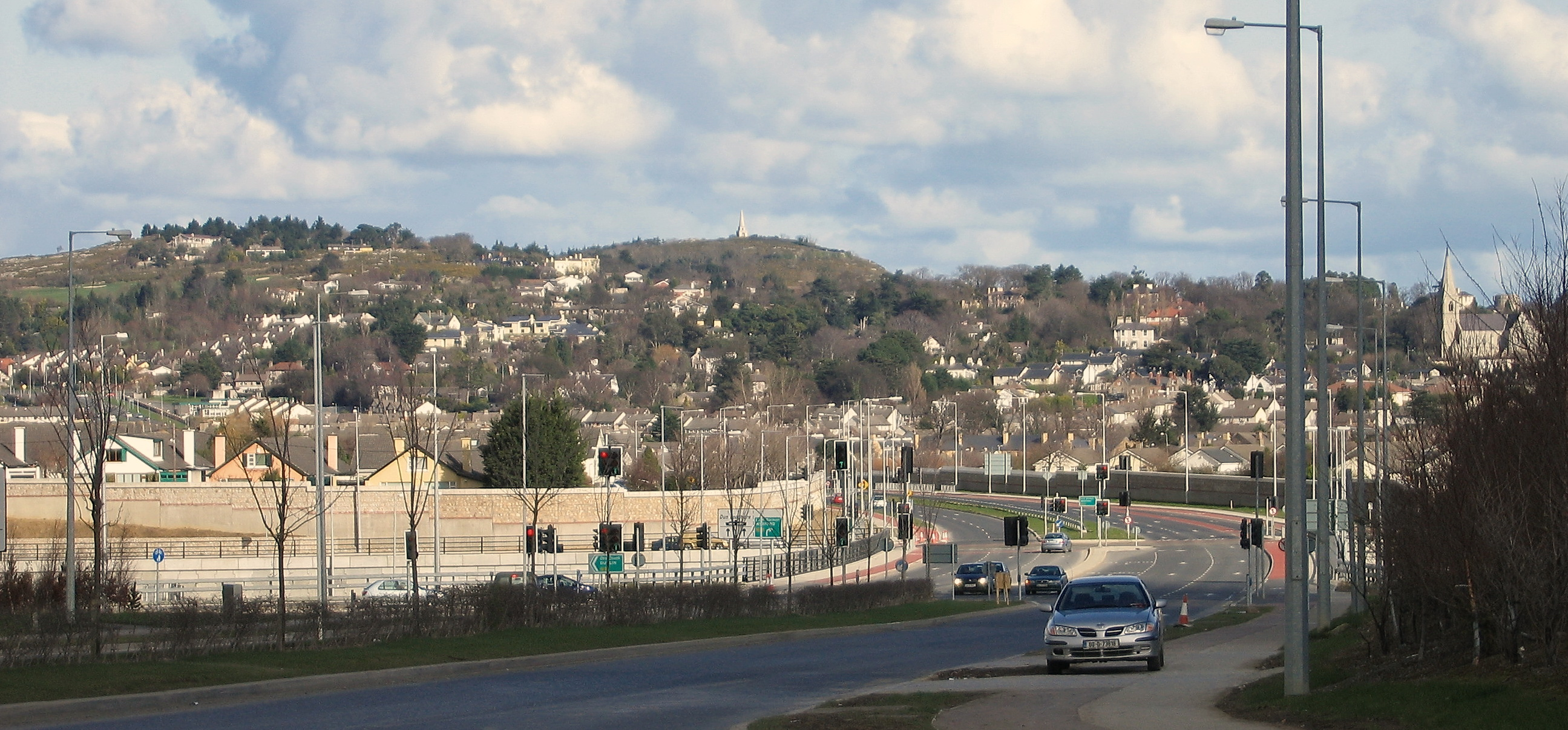
- R118 at Cherrywood looking east towards Killiney hill

Location
- Country: Ireland

Highway system
- Roads in Ireland; Motorways; Primary; Secondary; Regional

The R118 road is a regional road in south Dublin and Dún Laoghaire–Rathdown, Ireland. It links Kildare Street to Cherrywood.

The official description of the R118 from the Roads Act 1993 (Classification of Regional Roads) Order 2012 reads:

R118: Dublin - Blackrock, County Dublin and Dún Laoghaire - Lahaunstown, County Dublin

Between its junction with R138 at Kildare Street in the city of Dublin and its junction with N31 at Mount Merrion Avenue in the county of Dun Laoghaire — Rathdown via Leinster Street South (and via Lincoln Place, Westland Row, and Pearse Street), Clare Street, Merrion Square North, Mount Street Lower, Northumberland Road, Pembroke Road, Ballsbridge and Merrion Road in the city of Dublin: and Rock Road in the county of Dun Laoghaire — Rathdown

and

between its junction with N31 at Crofton Road and its junction with M50 at Lahaunstown via Marine Road, George's Street Upper (and via Park Road and Queen's Road), Glenageary Road Lower, Sallyglen Road, Church Road, Ballybrack dual carriageway, Wyattville Road and Wyattville Link Road all in the county of Dun Laoghaire — Rathdown.

== See also ==
- Roads in Ireland
- National primary road
- National secondary road
- Regional road
