= R131 road (Ireland) =

Road in Dublin

R131 road
- Bóthar R131
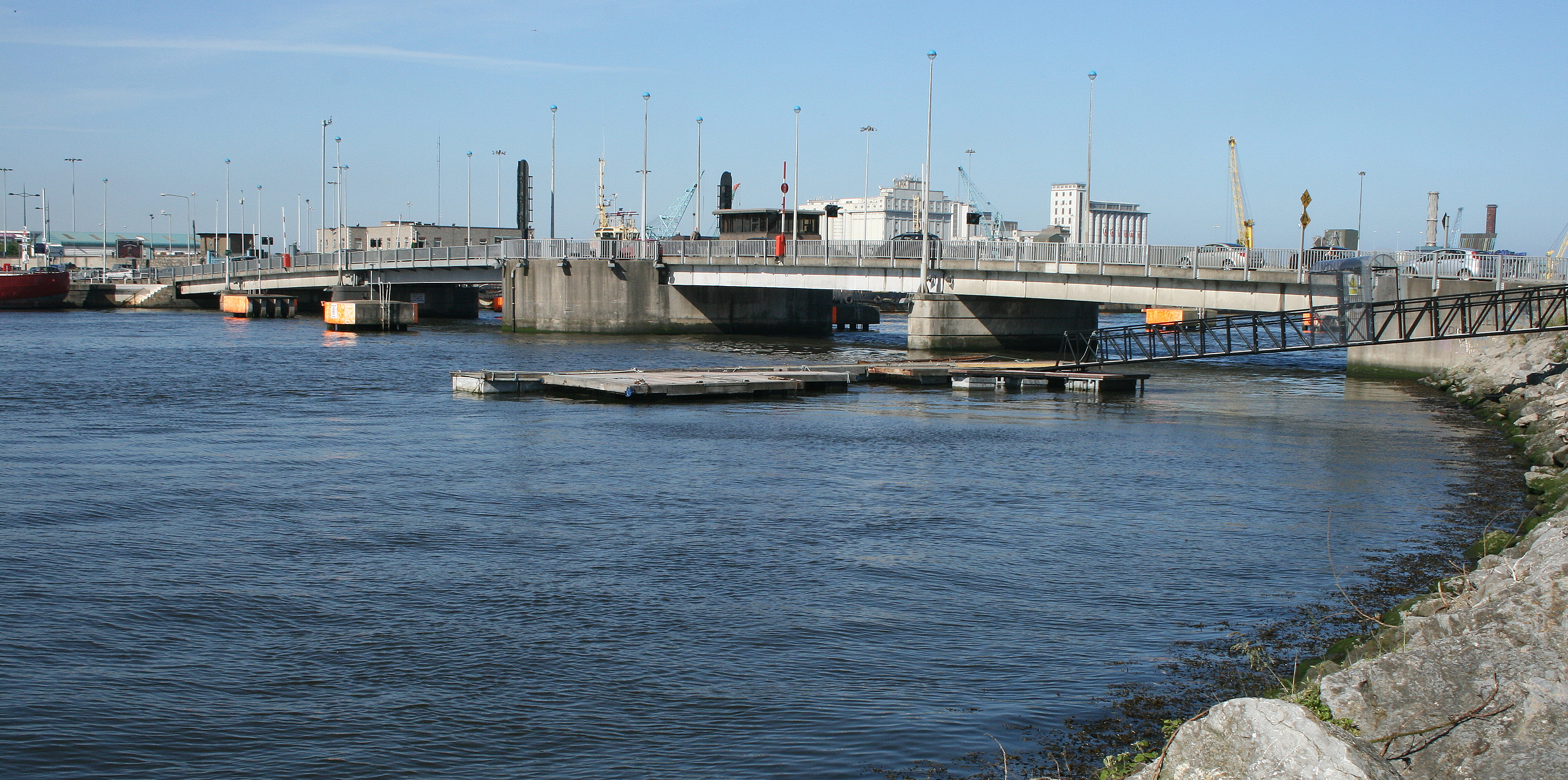
- The R131 crosses the Liffey at the East-Link bridge

Location
- Country: Ireland

Highway system
- Roads in Ireland; Motorways; Primary; Secondary; Regional

The R131 road is a regional road in Dublin, Ireland.

The official description of the R131 from the Roads Act 1993 (Classification of Regional Roads) Order 2012 reads:

R131: Drumcondra Road - East Link Bridge - Merrion Gates, Dublin

Between its junction with R132 at Drumcondra Road and its junction with R118 at Merrion Road via Clonliffe Road, Poplar Row, East Wall Road, East Link Toll Bridge, Toll Bridge Road, Sean Moore Road, Beach Road and Strand Road all in the city of Dublin.

== See also ==
- Roads in Ireland
- National primary road
- National secondary road
- Regional road
