= R138 road (Ireland) =

Road in Ireland

R138 road
- Bóthar R138
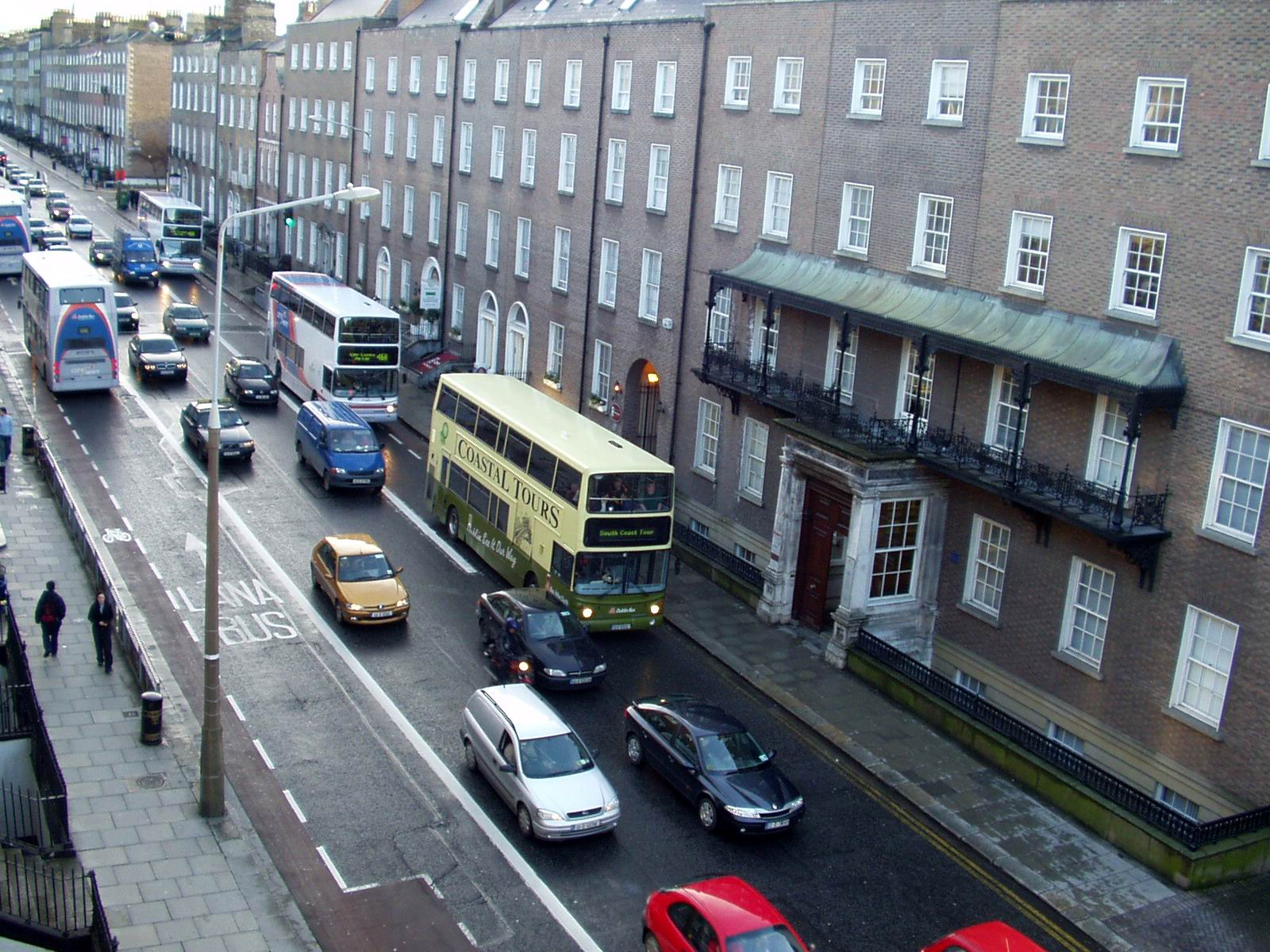
- R138 northbound on Leeson Street

Location
- Country: Ireland

Highway system
- Roads in Ireland; Motorways; Primary; Secondary; Regional

The R138 road is a regional road in Ireland. It commences at the south end of O'Connell Bridge in Dublin city centre. It proceeds along D'Olier Street, College Street (and in the opposite direction, Westmoreland Street).

The route continues around College Green and Grafton Street (and in the other direction, Suffolk Street, Church Lane and Dame Street). From here, it continues out of the city via Nassau Street, Kildare Street, the north side of St. Stephen's Green, Merrion Row, Baggot Street Lower, Pembroke Street Lower, Fitzwilliam Square West and Pembroke Street Upper. This route section in the other direction (into the city centre) runs via Leeson Street Lower (see thumbnail), east and north sides of St. Stephen's Green, and Dawson Street.

The R138 runs in both directions along Leeson Street Lower after the junction with Pembroke Street. Having crossed the Grand Canal, the route divides again for a portion of Leeson Street Upper, with outbound traffic proceeding via Sussex Road. It continues via Morehampton Road and Donnybrook Road, through Donnybrook, with the route becoming dual carriageway at Donnybrook Church, which marks the beginning of the Stillorgan Road.

The Stillorgan Road brings the road past Belfield, where University College Dublin is located (and accessed from a grade-separated interchange on the dual carriageway - the first full interchange built in Ireland) and onwards to its junction with the N11 and N31 at Mount Merrion Avenue.

== Route ==
The official description of the R138 from the Roads Act 1993 (Classification of Regional Roads) Order 2012 reads:

R138: O’Connell Bridge — Mount Merrion Avenue, County Dublin)

Between its junction with R148 at Bachelors Walk in the city of Dublin and its junction with N31 at Mount Merrion Avenue in the county of Dun Laoghaire-Rathdown via OConnell Bridge, DOlier Street, College Street (and via Westmoreland Street), College Green, Grafton Street (and via Suffolk Street, Church Lane and Dame Street), Nassau Street, Kildare Street, Saint Stephens Green North, (and via Saint Stephens Green North and Dawson Street) Merrion Row, Baggot Street Lower, Pembroke Street Lower, Fitzwilliam Square West, Pembroke Street Upper, (and via Leeson Street Lower and Saint Stephens Green East) Leeson Street Lower, Leeson Street Upper, Sussex Road (and via Leeson Street Upper), Morehampton Road, Donnybrook Road and Stillorgan Road in the city of Dublin: and Stillorgan Road in the county of Dun Laoghaire-Rathdown.

== See also ==
- Roads in Ireland
- National primary road
- National secondary road
- Regional road
