= Templeogue =

Suburb of Dublin, Ireland

Templeogue Teach Mealóg
- Suburb
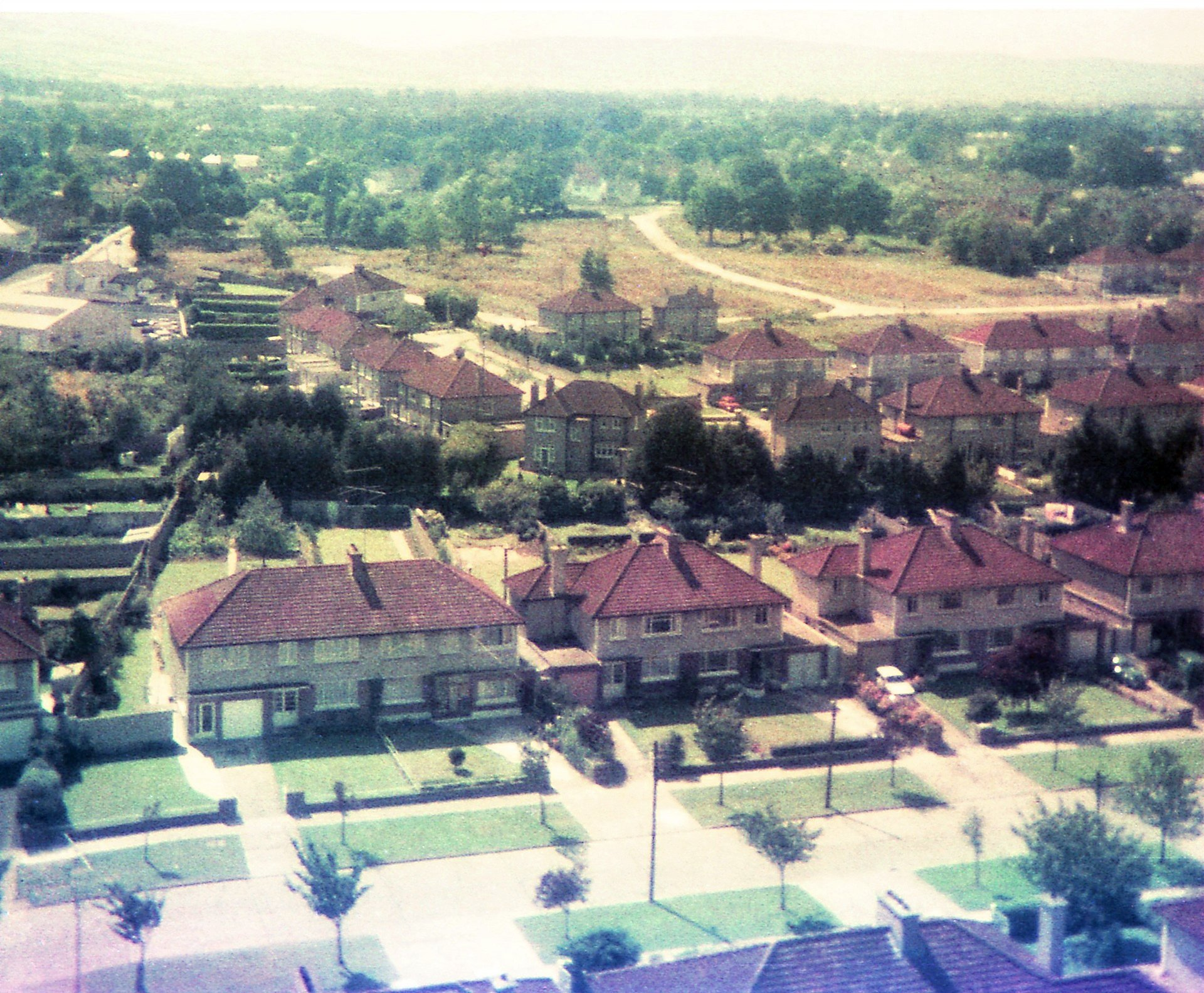
- Templeogue in the 1970s

- Location in Dublin Templeogue (Ireland)
- Coordinates: 53.2985°N 6.3028°W
- Country: Ireland
- Province: Leinster
- County: County Dublin

Area
  - Suburb: 5.34 km^{2} (2.06 sq mi)
- Elevation: 55 m (180 ft)

Population (2022)
  - Urban: 18,076
- Time zone: UTC+0 (WET)
  - Summer (DST): UTC-1 (IST (WEST))
- Eircode routing key: D6W
- Irish Grid Reference: O118292

Templeogue (Note: from Irish Teampal Óg, meaning 'new chapel', or Teach Mealóg, meaning 'house of St Mel (or Melog)'.) is a southwestern suburb of Dublin, Ireland. It lies between the River Poddle and River Dodder, and is about halfway from Dublin's centre to the mountains to the south.

== Geography ==
=== Location ===
Templeogue is 6 kilometres (4 mi) from Dublin city centre to the north, from the Dublin Mountains to the south, and from the coast at Dublin Bay, on the Irish Sea. It is 55 metres (180 ft) above sea level and occupies an area of 534 hectares (2 sq mi).

Suburbs adjacent to Templeogue are Ballyroan, Firhouse, Greenhills, Kimmage, Knocklyon, Perrystown, Rathfarnham, Tallaght, and Terenure.

=== Transport ===
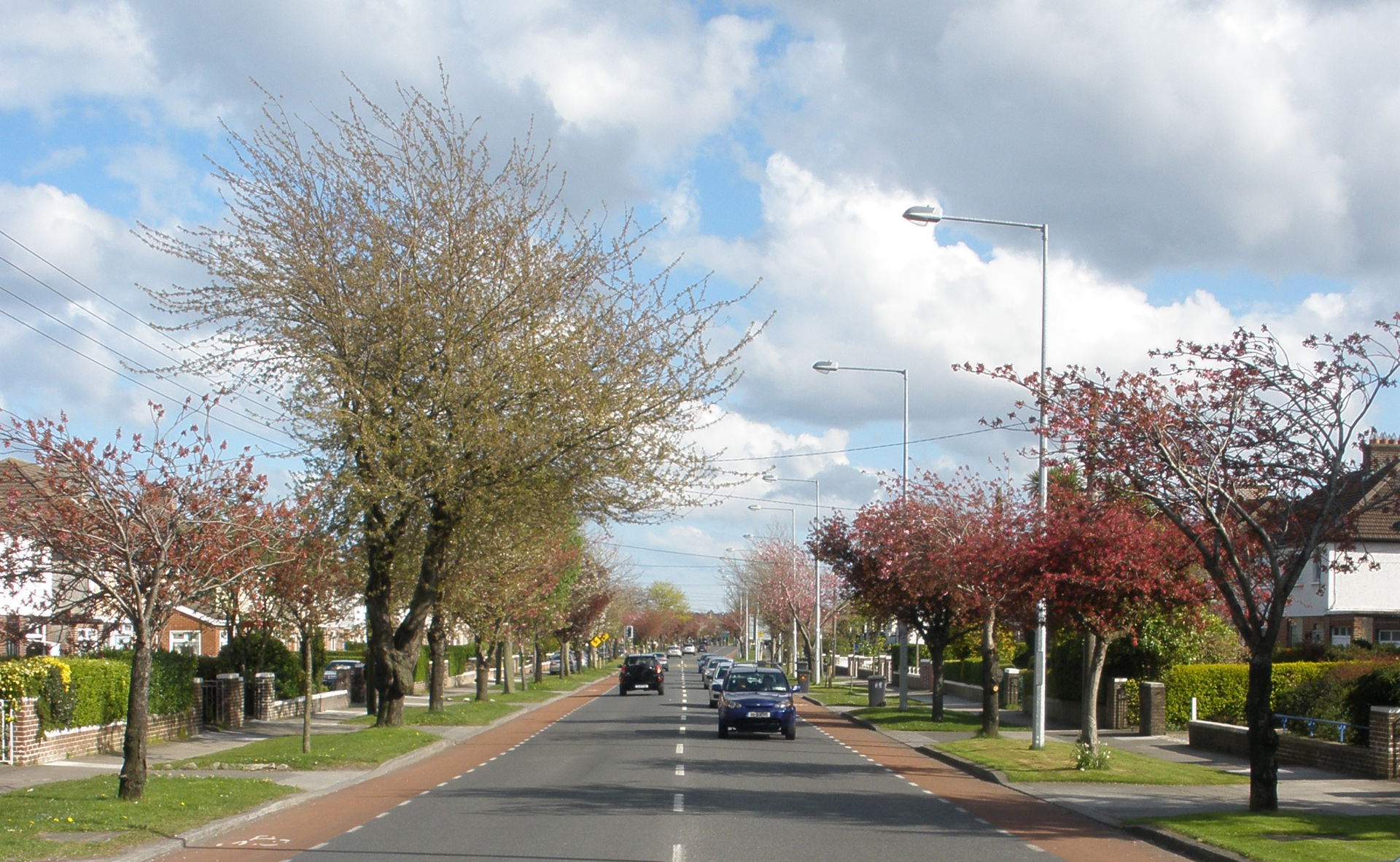
Templeville Road (R112 road)

The three main routes through the suburb are the R112 regional road (Templeville Road), the R137 regional road (Templeogue Road), and the R817 regional road (Cypress Grove Road and Wainsfort Road). The M50 motorway borders the suburb to the west.

Dublin Bus operates the following bus routes through Templeogue: 15, 15A, 15B, 15D, 65, 65B, 82, 150, F1, F2 and F3.

=== Natural features ===
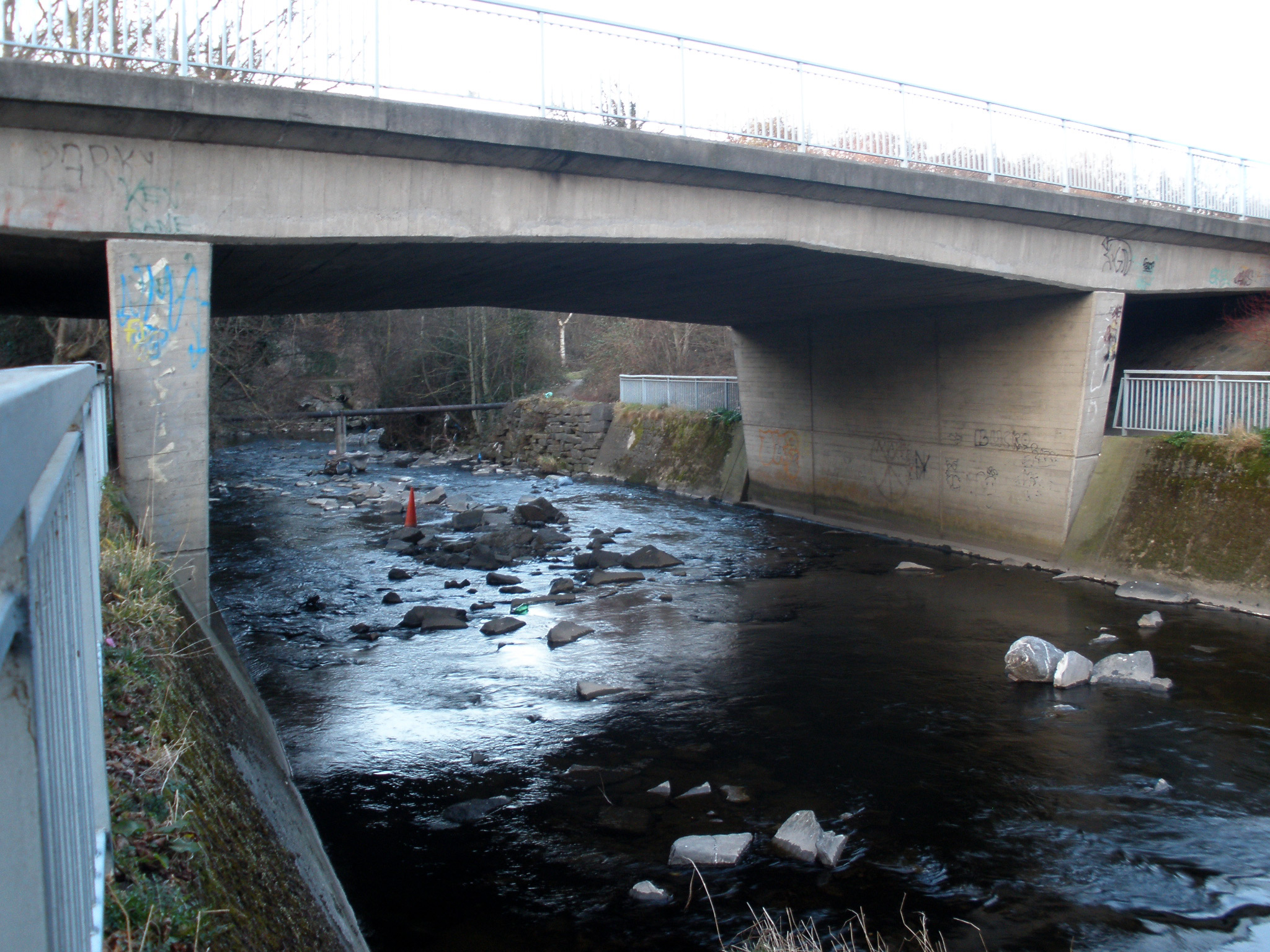
The River Dodder at Springfield Avenue bridge

The River Dodder forms a natural southern border with Rathfarnham and Knocklyon, while the River Poddle forms the northern border with Greenhills and Kimmage. The historical artificial watercourse from the Dodder at Firhouse to the Poddle passed through Templeogue.

Prominent views from Templeogue are of Montpelier Hill 5.7 km (3.5 mi) to the southwest, topped by the ruin of the Hellfire Club at 383 metres (1,257 ft), and of Three Rock Mountain (450 m), topped by transmitter masts, 7.3 km (4.5 mi) to the southeast.

== Etymology ==
Before the Irish language was standardised officially by the Caighdeán Oifigiúil (official standard), the original name of Templeogue in Irish varied, including such spellings as Teampal Óg ("new chapel") referring to a chapel that was built there in about 1273, as well as Tachmelóg, Tigh Malóg, and Tachmelag. An early anglicisation was spelled Temple Oyge. The standardised modern spelling in Irish used by the official Placenames Database of Ireland is Teach Mealóg.

== History ==
Templeogue was originally a village in the rural, southern part of County Dublin.

In Elizabethan times it was owned by the Talbot family, who later became prominent as the owners of Mount Talbot. The Talbot's estate was forfeited to the Crown on the Restoration of Charles II.

In the later seventeenth and eighteenth centuries, it was owned by the Domviles. The Domviles effectively had some control over the canal drawn from the Dodder to the Poddle, which passed through their estates- at that time it provided Dublin's main drinking water supply, as well as critical power for multiple watermills.

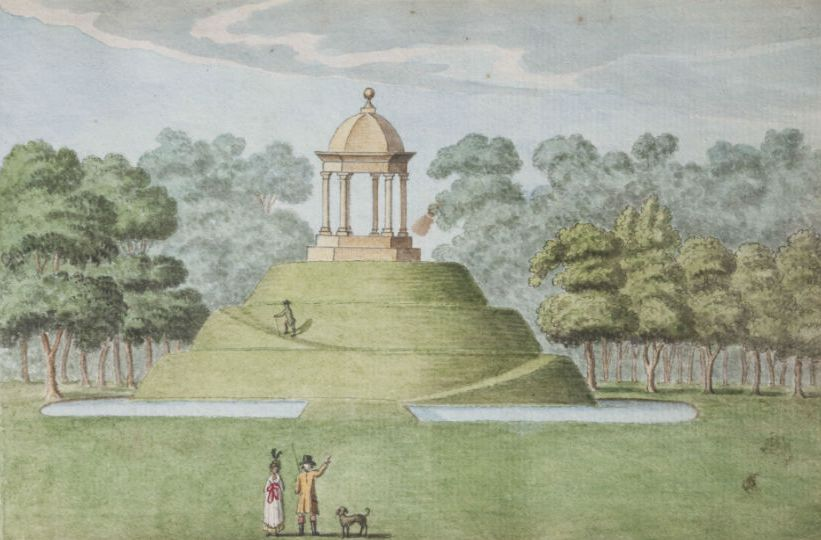
A folly temple in the grounds of Templeogue House from an illustration of 1751.

An illustration of the Doric temple at Templeogue House by Gabriel Beranger from around 1751 illustrates the grounds of the Domville estate as it would have looked when lived in by Sir Compton Domvile, 2nd Baronet. The temple was later moved to another family property, Santry Court, along with a number of other follies in 1781 when Charles Domvile vacated the estate as the house had fallen into disrepair. Today Templeogue House still contains many of the original features and is one of the oldest structures in the area.

In 1801, the Templeogue Road was constructed, originally as a toll road.

Urban expansion of Dublin during the 1950s and '60s absorbed the village.

== Amenities ==
=== Schools ===
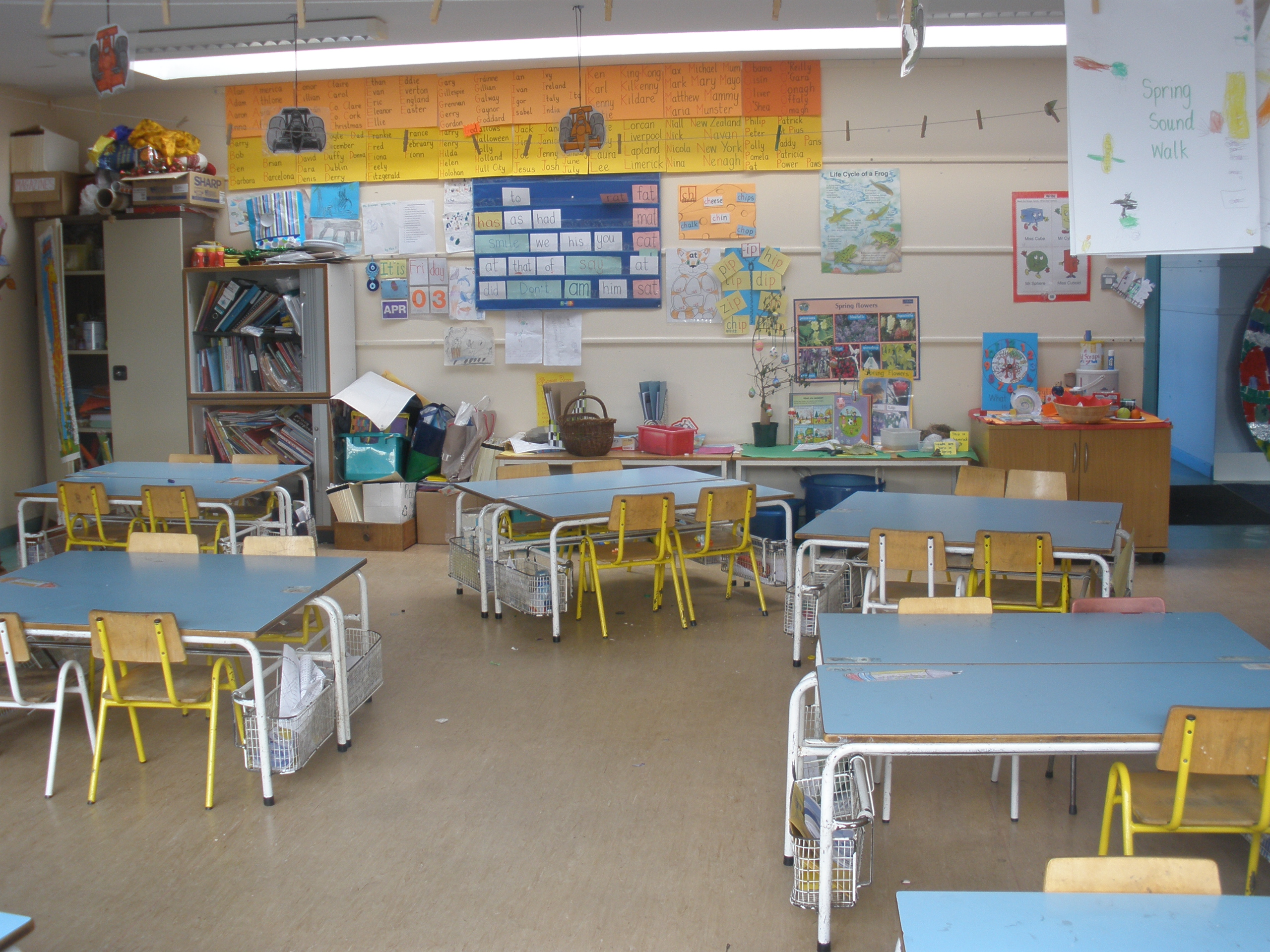
St. Pius X school classroom

The local schools are St. Pius X National School, Our Lady's Secondary School, Templeogue College, St. Mac Dara's Community College, Bishop Galvin National School and Bishop Shanahan National School.

=== Sports ===
Local sports facilities are Faughs GAA Club, St. Judes GAA Club, St. Mary's College RFC, Templeogue Swimming Club, Templeogue Tennis Club, and Templeogue United Football Club.

=== Shops and services ===
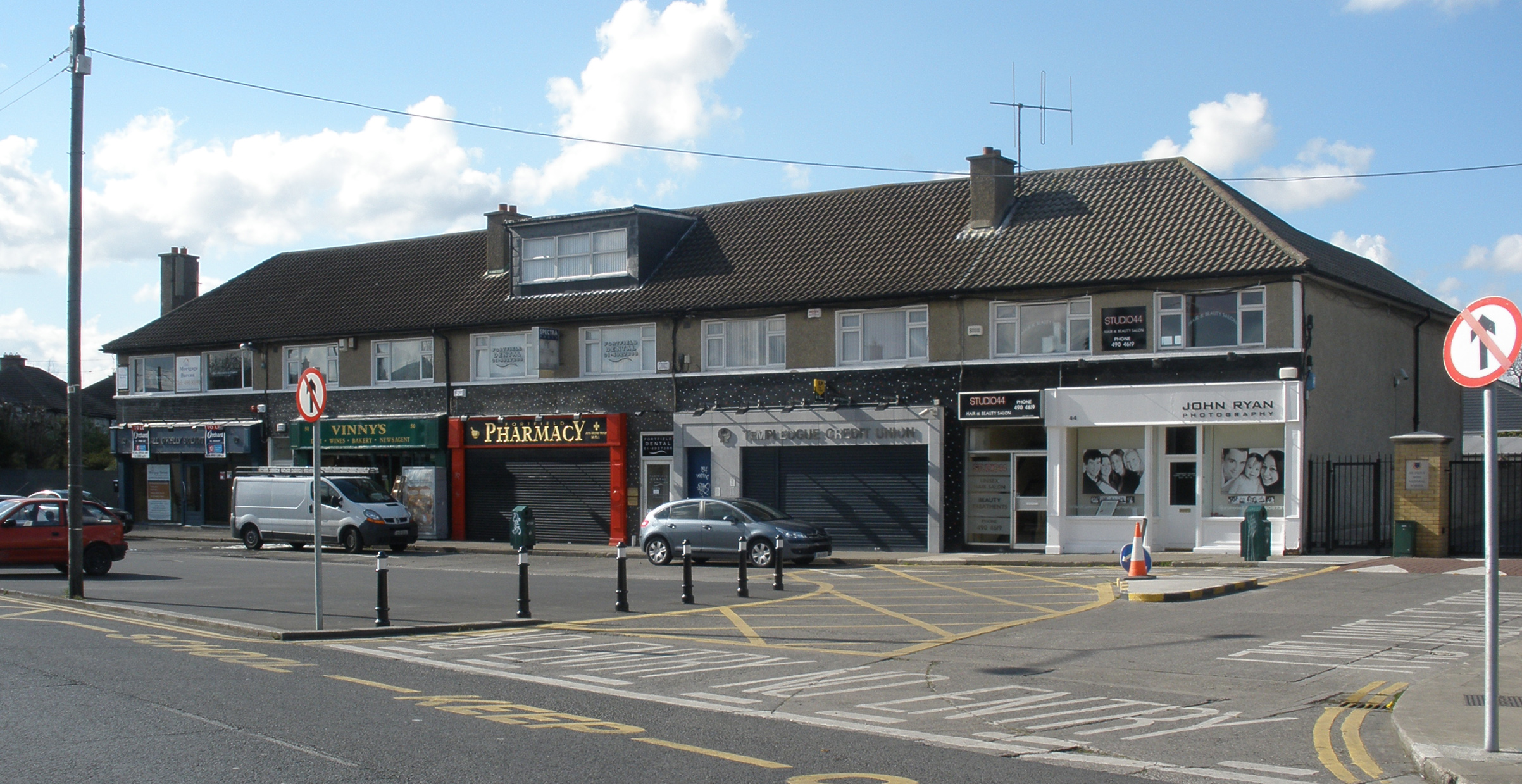
Shops at Fortfield Park

Shops, restaurants, and small business services are located in the village on Templeogue Road, as well as in Fortfield Park, Cypress Park, Wainsfort Drive, Orwell Shopping Centre, and Rathfarnham Shopping Centre.

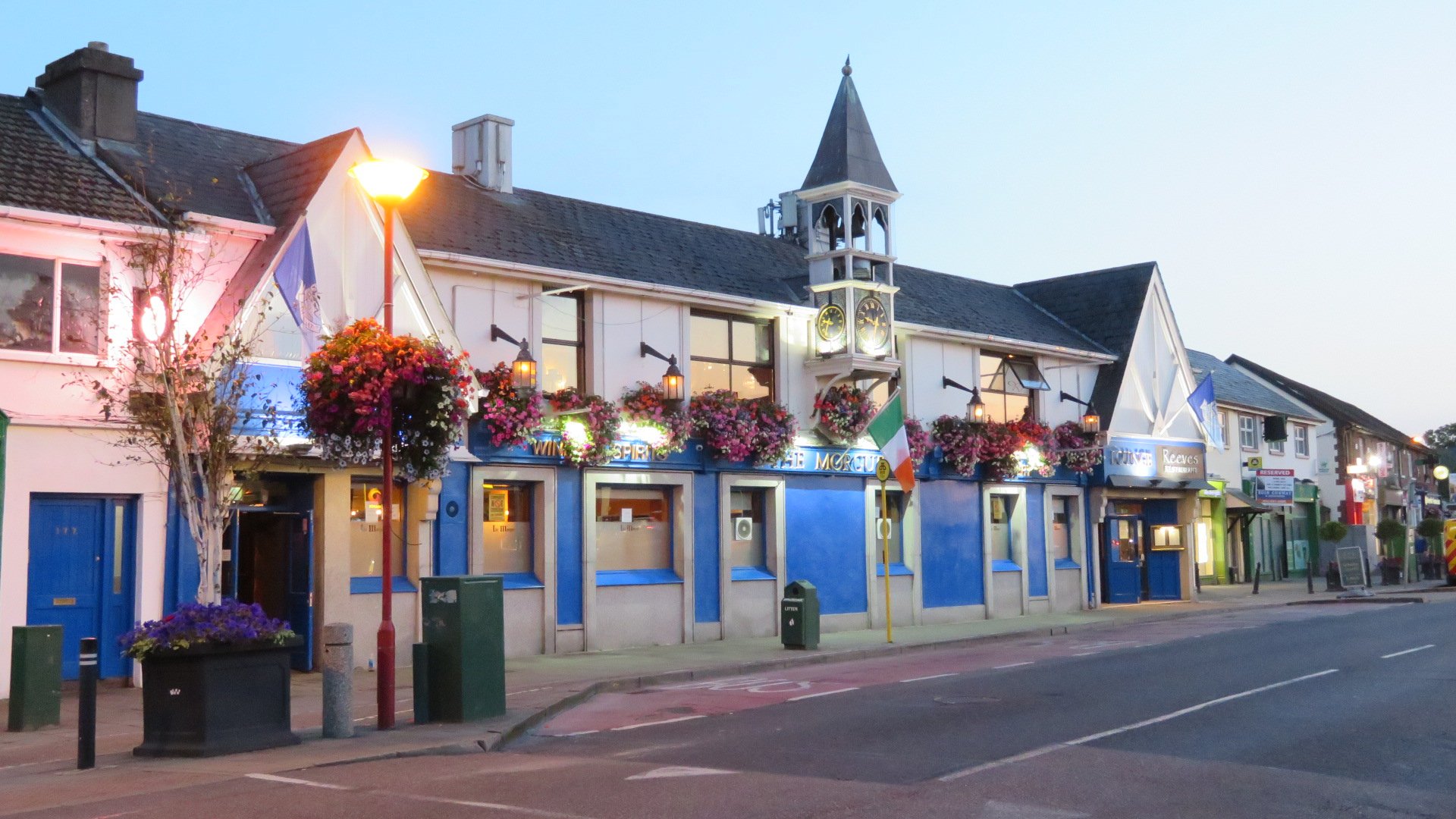
The Templeogue Inn in Templeogue Village

Although surrounded by pubs in adjacent neighbourhoods, Templeogue has only one pub inside its boundaries, The Templeogue Inn, also known as The Morgue. In the 19th and early 20th centuries, the Dublin and Blessington Steam Tramway passed through Templeogue so close to the pub that pedestrians were sometimes hit. Some corpses were sheltered in the pub until taken away and the pub acquired the permanent, morbid nickname. The Templeogue Inn was, for a while, the most expensive pub in Ireland when it changed hands on 12 October 1983 for IR£660,000, a remarkable sum at the time.

=== Churches ===
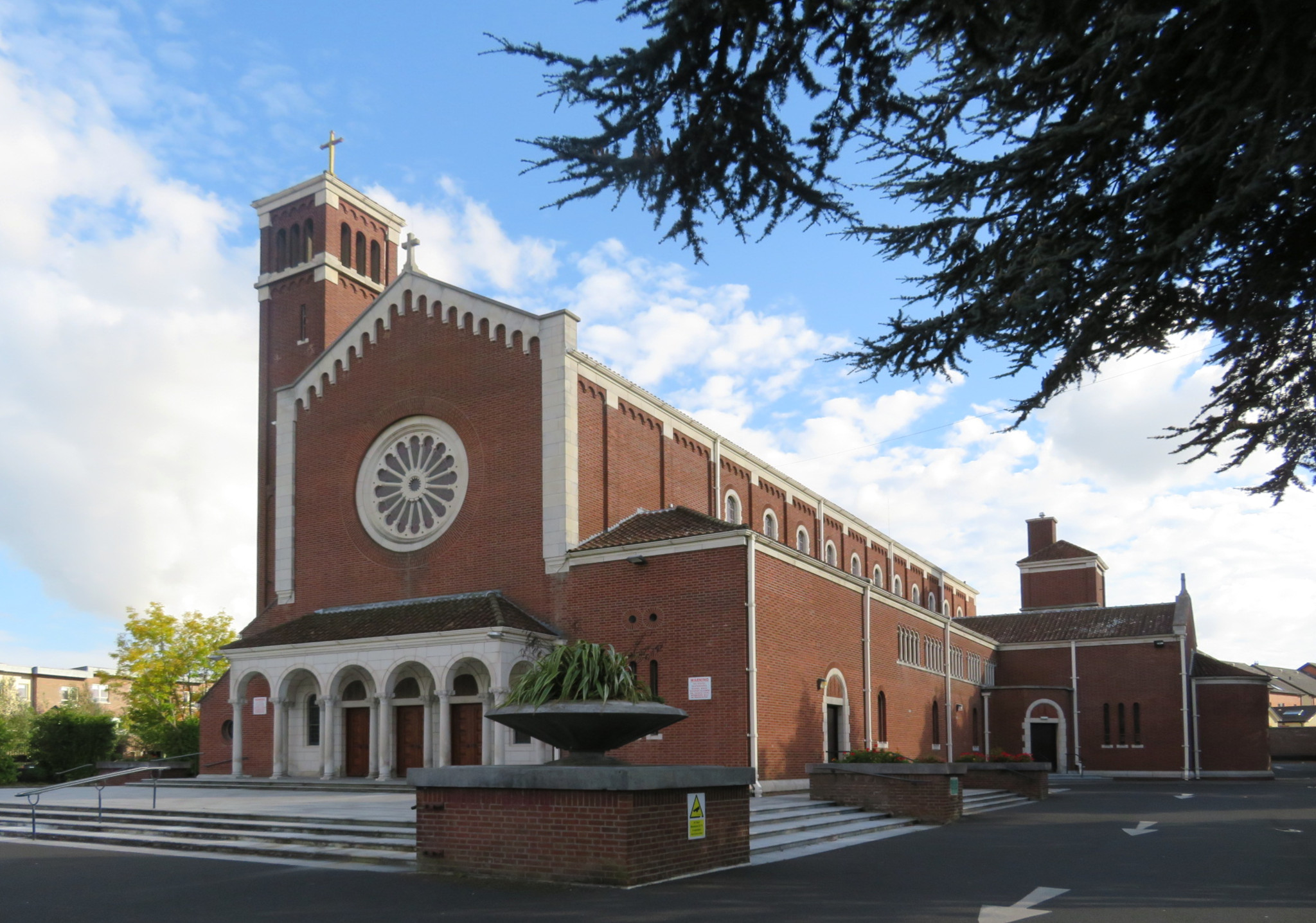
St. Pius X Church

The Roman Catholic parish church is St. Pius X which opened on 27 November 1960 on College Drive. A historical chapel was built in the 13th century beside the graveyard which survives at Wellington Lane, where the original village of Templeogue was located.

St. Jude's church was built at Orwell Park on 7 December 1975 to serve the newer housing estates of Orwell, Willington, Rossmore and surrounding areas.

== Political geography ==
Templeogue is in the Dáil constituency of Dublin South-West.

It is in the county of South Dublin and is in the local electoral area of Rathfarnham–Templeogue for elections to South Dublin County Council. The north-eastern edge of the suburb forms part of the boundary with the Dublin City Council administrative area.

Templeogue is part of the Dublin 6W postal district.

== Population ==
Templeogue's population at the 2022 census was 18,076, a rise of 3.9 percent from the previous 2016 census. In the 36 years from 1986 to 2022, the population fell by 1,566, a decrease of 8 percent.

Historical population
Year	Pop.	±%
1986	19,642	—
1991	19,647	+0.0%
1996	18,662	−5.0%
2002	18,383	−1.5%
2006	17,699	−3.7%
2011	17,378	−1.8%
2016	17,395	+0.1%
2022	18,076	+3.9%
Source: www.cso.ie

Electoral Division	Population 2022	Population 2016	Population 1986	Change 2016-2022	Change 1986-2022
Templeogue-Cypress	2,807	2,714	3,150	+3.43%	–10.89%
Templeogue-Kimmage Manor	4,929	4,856	3,782	+1.50%	+30.33%
Templeogue-Limekiln	3,821	3,449	4,616	+10.79%	–17.22%
Templeogue-Orwell	1,991	2,056	2,864	–3.16%	–30.48%
Templeogue-Osprey	2,258	2,246	3,047	+0.53%	–25.89%
Templeogue Village	2,270	2,074	2,183	+9.45%	+3.99%
Templeogue Total	18,076	17,395	19,642	+3.91%	–7.97%

== Culture ==
=== Literature ===
The author James Joyce, who was born 2 km to the northeast in Rathgar, refers to Templeogue in his novel, Finnegans Wake.

The poet Austin Clarke lived in Bridge House beside Templeogue Bridge, which spans the River Dodder. After his death, there was a proposal to preserve the house and his library of 6,500 books as a memorial. This was not possible owing to long-term plans to demolish the house and widen the road. The old Templeogue Bridge, built in 1800, and Bridge House were removed and a new bridge at the same location was opened by councillor Bernie Malone on 11 December 1984. The new bridge was named in honour of Austin Clarke.

The novelists Mary Beckett, Charles Lever, and Flora Shaw resided in Templeogue as did journalists Ursula Halligan and Michael Mills, and radio music host Larry Gogan.

=== Sculpture ===
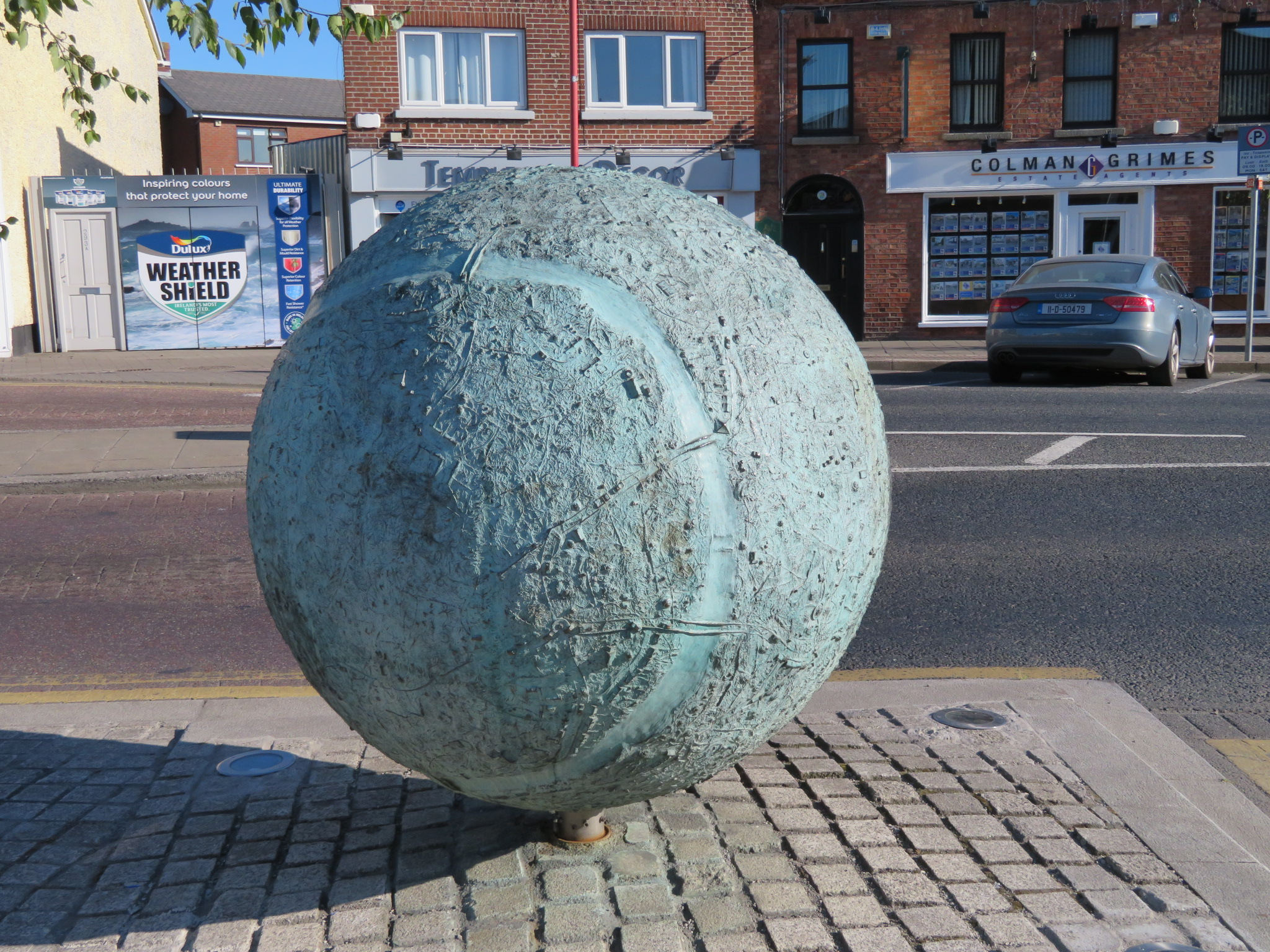
Love All, sculpture by Rachel Joynt

An outdoor bronze sculpture in Templeogue Village, Love All by Irish artist Rachel Joynt, was unveiled by the mayor of South Dublin, Billy Gogarty, on 14 July 2007. Commissioned by the South Dublin County Council and installed near the Templeogue Tennis Club, the 1.1 metre artwork depicts a tennis ball which, on closer scrutiny, reveals a miniature world including streets, road traffic, houses, people, and mountains, and the seam of the tennis ball resembles a winding river with bridges, inspired by the local River Dodder. The tennis-ball world rotates on its axle like a globe on its axis, when pushed.

=== Cuisine ===
The spice bag, Ireland's most popular fast food item during the 2010s and 2020s, was invented at the Sunflower restaurant in the Orwell Shopping Centre in Templeogue in 2006. It usually consists of chicken, chips, stir-fried vegetables, and hot seasonings. In 2025, the term "spice bag" was added to the Oxford English Dictionary, and the dictionary credited the Sunflower as the source of the term.

== Notable residents ==
- Mary Beckett — Novelist and short story writer.
- Austin Clarke — Poet, novelist, playwright, author, English lecturer.
- Liam Cosgrave — Taoiseach; leader of Fine Gael.
- W. T. Cosgrave — First President of the Executive Council of the Irish Free State.
- Larry Gogan — Disc jockey; radio and television broadcaster.
- Hermann Görtz — Nazi spy, stayed at 245 Templeogue road during May 1940.
- Ursula Halligan — Journalist and broadcaster.
- Charles Lever — Doctor and novelist.
- John McCann — Teachta Dála for Dublin South; Alderman on Dublin City Council; Lord Mayor of Dublin; playwright and author; journalist; father of the actor Donal McCann.
- Kevin McManamon — Football player for St Jude's GAA club and formerly for Dublin county football team (2010 to 2021).
- Michael Mills — Political journalist with the Irish Press and Ombudsman of Ireland.
- Flora Shaw — Writer who coined the name "Nigeria" for the African country.
- Sir Frederick Shaw — Recorder of Dublin 1830–76 and Dundalk; built Kimmage Manor.
- Sir Robert Shaw — Tory MP for Dublin City 1830–1831 and 1832; member of the Privy Council of Ireland; owner of Bushy Park estate.
- George Simms — Church of Ireland Archbishop of Dublin; Archbishop of Armagh and Primate of All Ireland.
- Mervyn Taylor — Dublin County Councillor, Teachta Dála, Minister for Labour, and Minister for Equality and Law Reform.

== Gallery ==
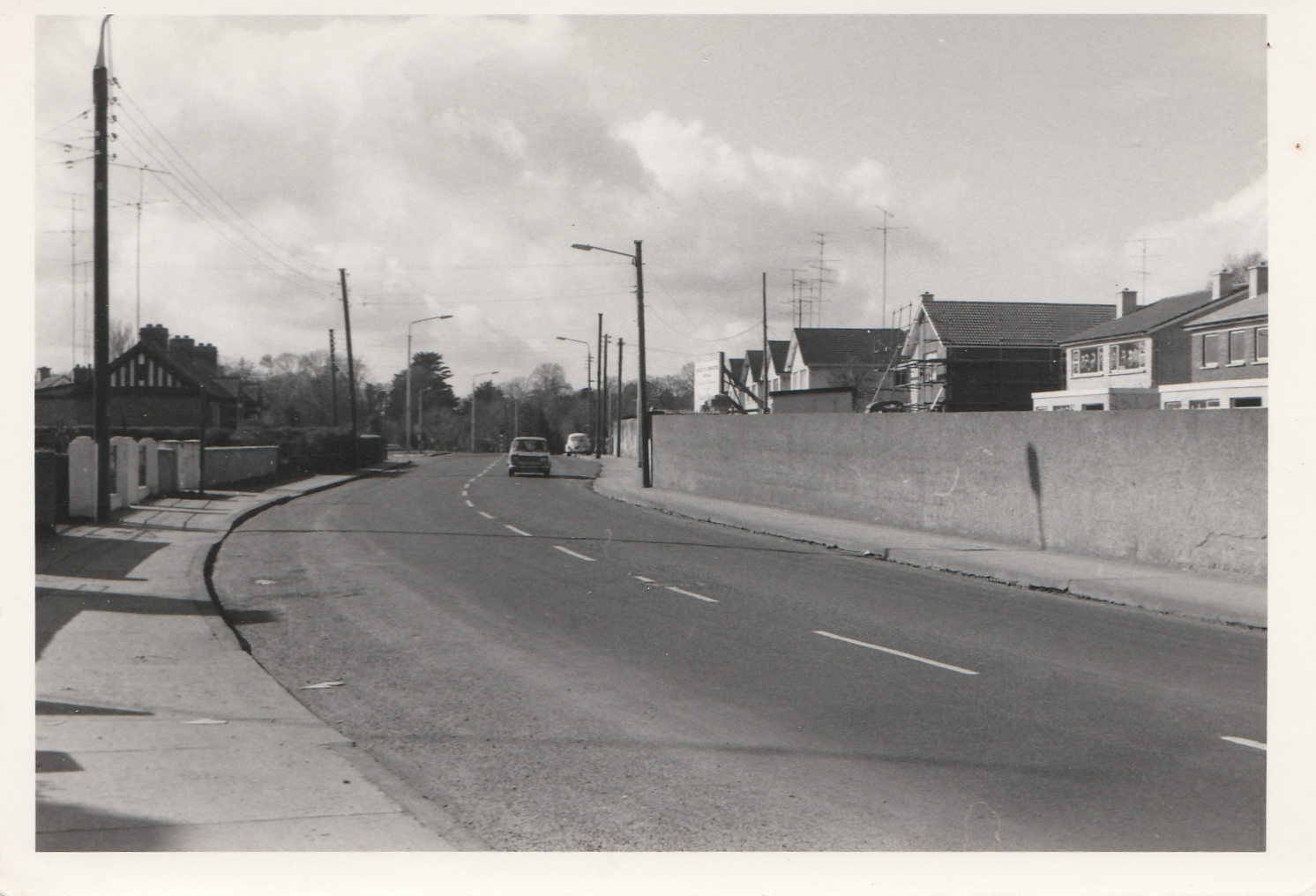
Templeogue Road (R137) near Templeogue Bridge in the 1960s

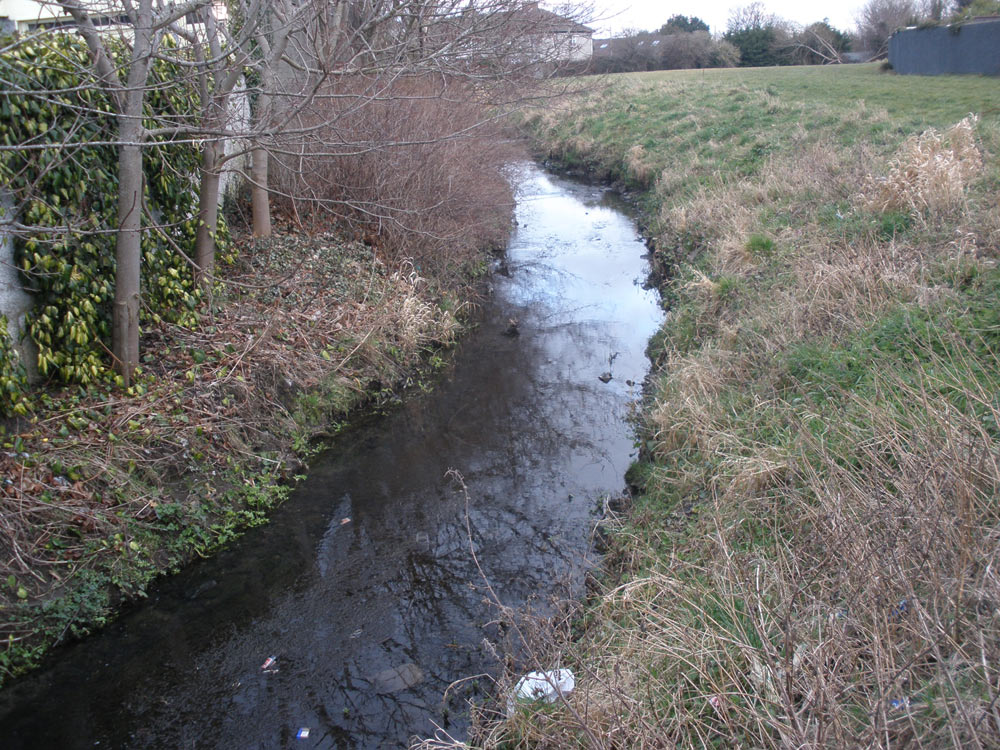
The River Poddle at upper Templeville Road

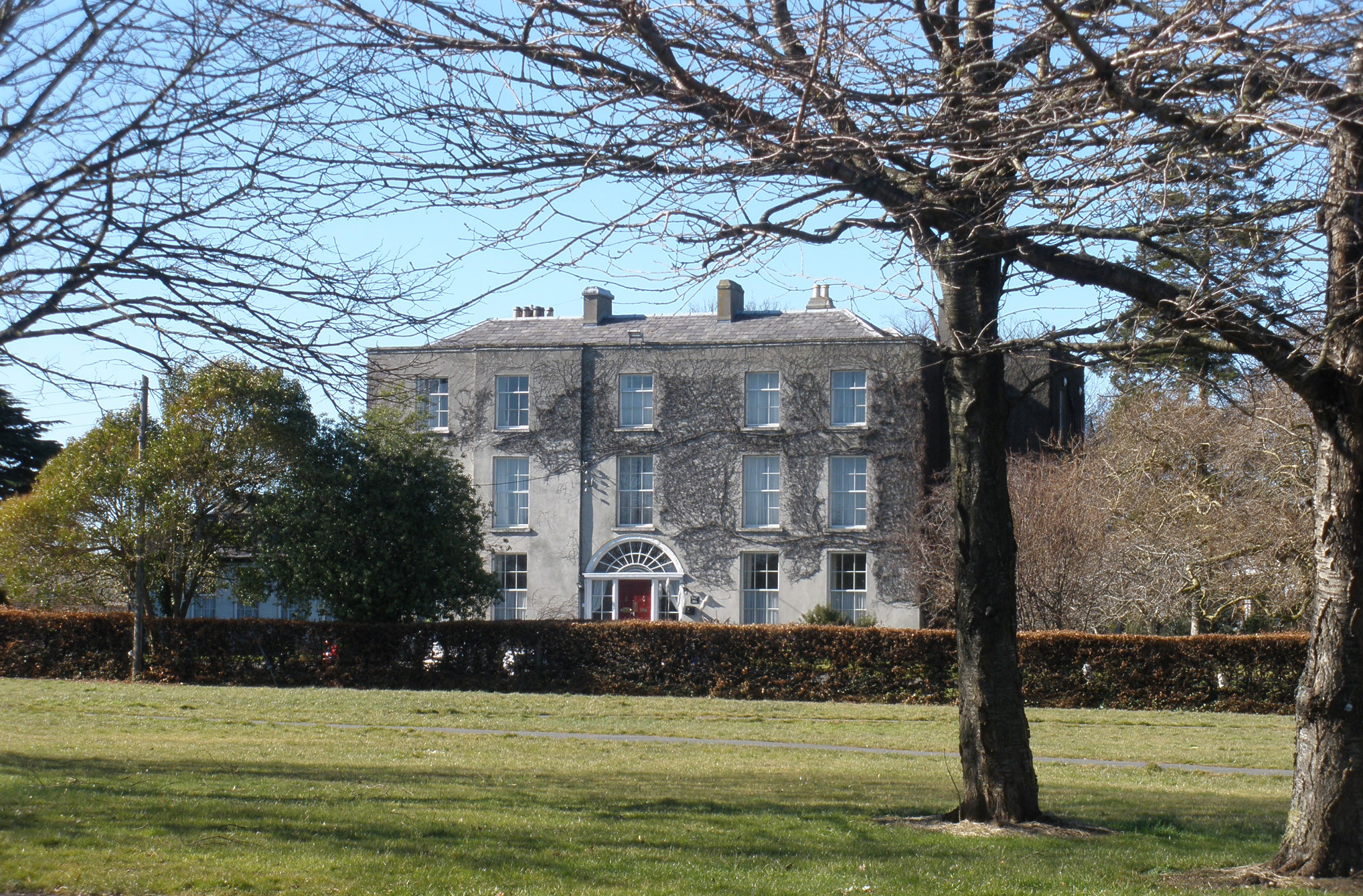
Cypress Grove House on Cypress Grove Road

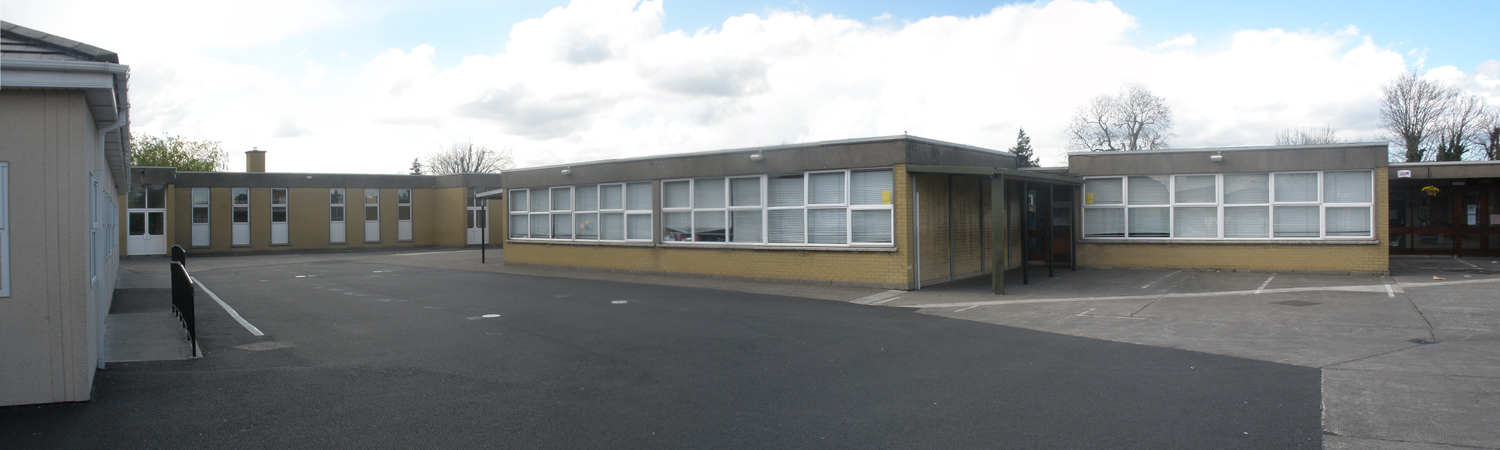
St. Pius X National School on Fortfield Park
