= Goatstown =

Suburb of Dublin, Ireland

Goatstown Baile na nGabhar (Irish)
- Suburb
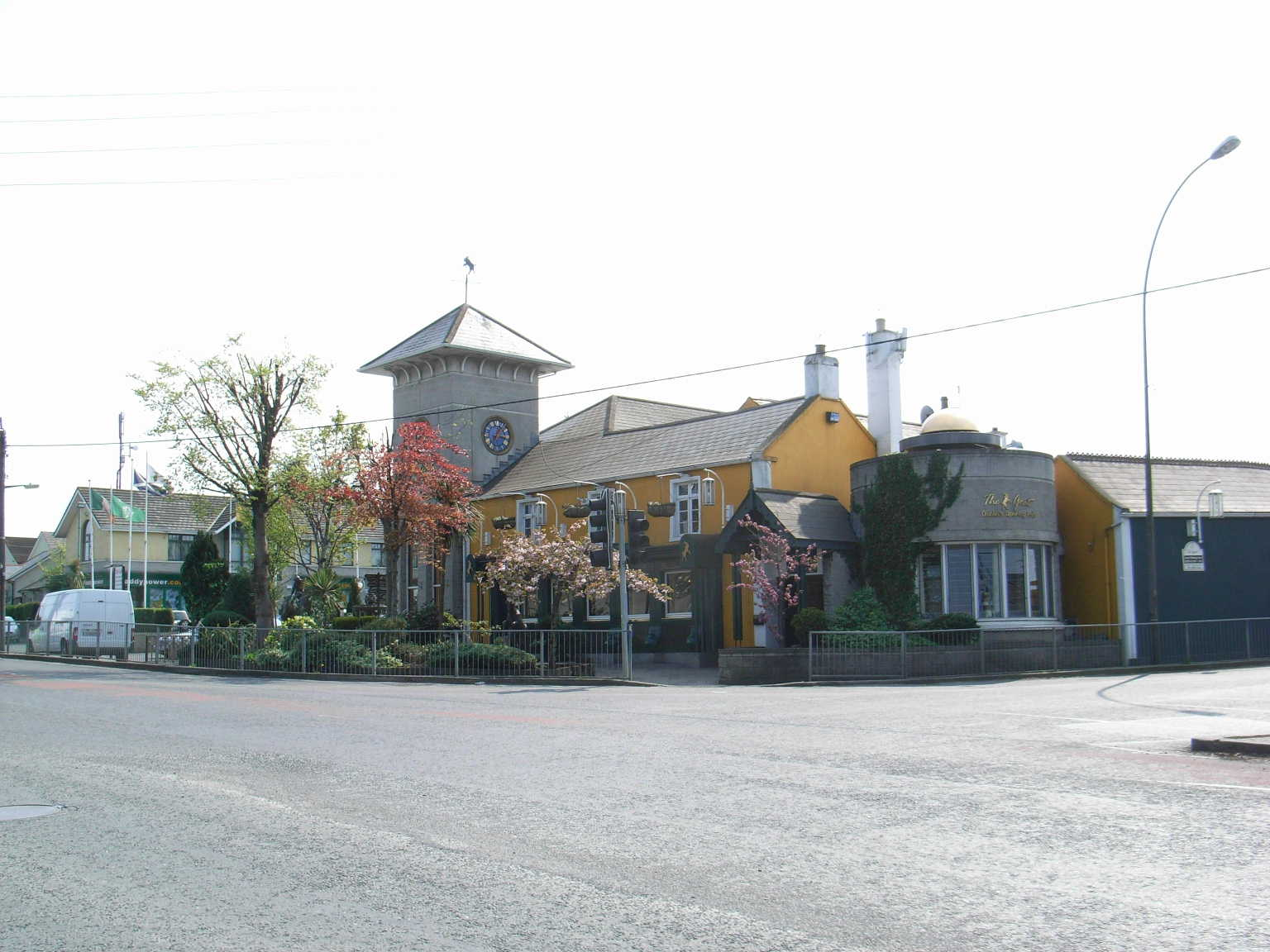
- The Goat Grill

- Location in Dublin Goatstown (Ireland)
- Coordinates: 53.293°N 6.230°W
- Country: Ireland
- Province: Leinster
- Traditional county: County Dublin
- Local authority: Dún Laoghaire–Rathdown County Council
- Time zone: UTC+0 (WET)
  - Summer (DST): UTC-1 (IST (WEST))
- Eircode routing key: D14
- Telephone area code: +353(0)1

Goatstown (Irish: Baile na nGabhar) is a small suburb on the southside of Dublin, Ireland. It is primarily a residential area. To the west is Dundrum, to the east is Blackrock, to the south is Kilmacud, and to the north is Clonskeagh. The area is also bordered by Mount Merrion, with which it shares many local amenities. Entrances to University College Dublin can be found on Roebuck Road, and due to the area's proximity to the campus, the suburb hosts many university students.

== Nature ==
Goatstown is primarily a residential area, with extensive housing developments from the middle decades of the 20th century onwards, with little local industry. It is roughly centred on a pub named the Goat Grill, at the intersection of Goatstown Road and Taney Road, where there has been a pub since the early 18th century.

== Etymology ==
Goatstown got its name from the fact that formerly goats were bred there; in the 19th century it was popular to travel to Dundrum and nearby Goatstown as goat's milk was considered to be excellent for those suffering from tuberculosis.

== Political geography ==
Goatstown is in the functional area of Dún Laoghaire–Rathdown County Council. The Dublin City Council administrative area border lies just to its north.

== Transport ==
A number of roads pass through Goatstown. At the crossroads the R112 passes from west (Taney Road) to east (Mount Anville Road), to the south is the R825 (Goatstown Road) and to the north is the R133 (Lower Kilmacud Road). A short distance from the crossroads is a T-junction where the R826 terminates at the R112 on Taney Road.

The Luas green line runs through the southwest corner of Goatstown and the Dundrum stop is nearby, with the vehicular entrance off Taney Road, as is Balally at Drummartin Road.

The bus routes Dublin Bus 11, 11a and L25 and Go-Ahead Ireland S6 and S8 run through Goatstown as well, linking Goatstown to the city centre, Blackrock, Dún Laoghaire and Tallaght. The 75 used to run through Goatstown until 26 November 2023 when it was replaced with the L25.

== Education ==
There is a primary school called Our Lady's Grove, as well as two all-girls secondary schools, Mount Anville Secondary School, and Our Lady's Grove Secondary School (previously called Jesus and Mary), and an Educate Together secondary school called Goatstown Educate Together Secondary School, formerly situated in Churchtown.

== Amenities ==
There are amenities such as restaurants, a pub, a post office and various shops.

== Development ==
To the east of the Goatstown Road lies former allotment land, much of which was compulsorily purchased during the 1960s for the proposed Eastern Bypass / Saint Helen's link road. A portion of this land is currently being built on by Dún Laoghaire–Rathdown County Council, to provide social and affordable housing.

A Georgian house and remaining surrounding land, known as Trimbleston, was sold in the early 1990s to builders Sorohan Brothers. The house was subsequently damaged in two fires and the remaining ruins were demolished and replaced by a housing and apartment development, also called Trimbleston. Phase two of Trimbleston has recently commenced with the demolition of five two-storey houses on Goatstown Road and the construction of 202 dwelling units in their place and on land to the east owned by the Sorohans.

== Notable people ==
- William Dargan lived for a time in Mount Anville House in Goatstown. The award-winning cable-stay Luas bridge at Taney Junction was named Dargan Bridge.
- Barry Desmond, politician
- David Kelly, Irish actor, resided in the town till his death in 2012
- Paul Murphy, politician
- Brian O'Driscoll, former Irish rugby player
- Shane Ross, politician, born here
- Mundy, musician

== Notable events ==
Charlie Chawke, who took over the local pub in 1982 and changed the name from Traynor's to the Goat Grill, was shot in the leg in October 2003 in a robbery and had his right leg amputated five days later.

In another widely publicised case, on 5 March 2008, a jury found Brian Kearney guilty of the murder of his wife, Siobhán Kearney, at their home in Cnoc na Sí, Goatstown in February 2006.

== See also ==
- List of towns and villages in Ireland

== External ==
County Council Map for proposed Goatstown Local Area Plan
