= R818 road (Ireland) =

Road in Ireland

R818 road
- Bóthar R818
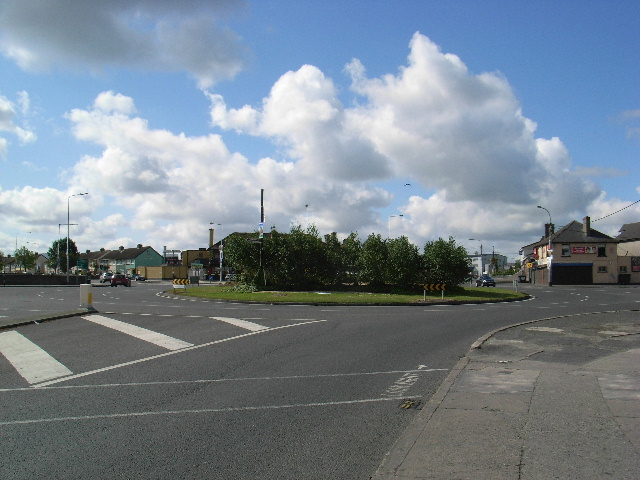
- Walkinstown Roundabout marks the western end of the R818

Route information
- Length: 3.3 km (2.1 mi)

Location
- Country: Ireland
- Primary destinations: Dublin; R137 (Templeogue Road); Terenure Road West; Dublin / South Dublin; Kimmage Road West; Cromwellsfort Road; R112 (Walkinstown Roundabout)

Highway system
- Roads in Ireland; Motorways; Primary; Secondary; Regional

The R818 road is a regional road in Dublin, Ireland.

The official definition of the R818 from the Roads Act 1993 (Classification of Regional Roads) Order 2012 states:

R818: Terenure - Walkinstown Roundabout, County Dublin

Between its junction with R137 at Templeogue Road Terenure in the city of Dublin and its junction with R112 at Walkinstown Roundabout in the county of South Dublin via Terenure Road West in the city of Dublin: Kimmage Road West and Cromwellsfort Road in both the city of Dublin and the county of South Dublin.

== See also ==
- Roads in Ireland
- Regional road
