= R114 road =

R114 road may refer to:

- R114 road (South Africa)
- R114 road (Ireland)
