= Dargan Bridge =

Dargan Bridge may refer to:

- Dargan Bridge, Belfast, Northern Ireland
- William Dargan Bridge, Dublin, Ireland
