= R112 road (Ireland) =

Suburban road in Dublin, Ireland

R112 road
- Bóthar R112
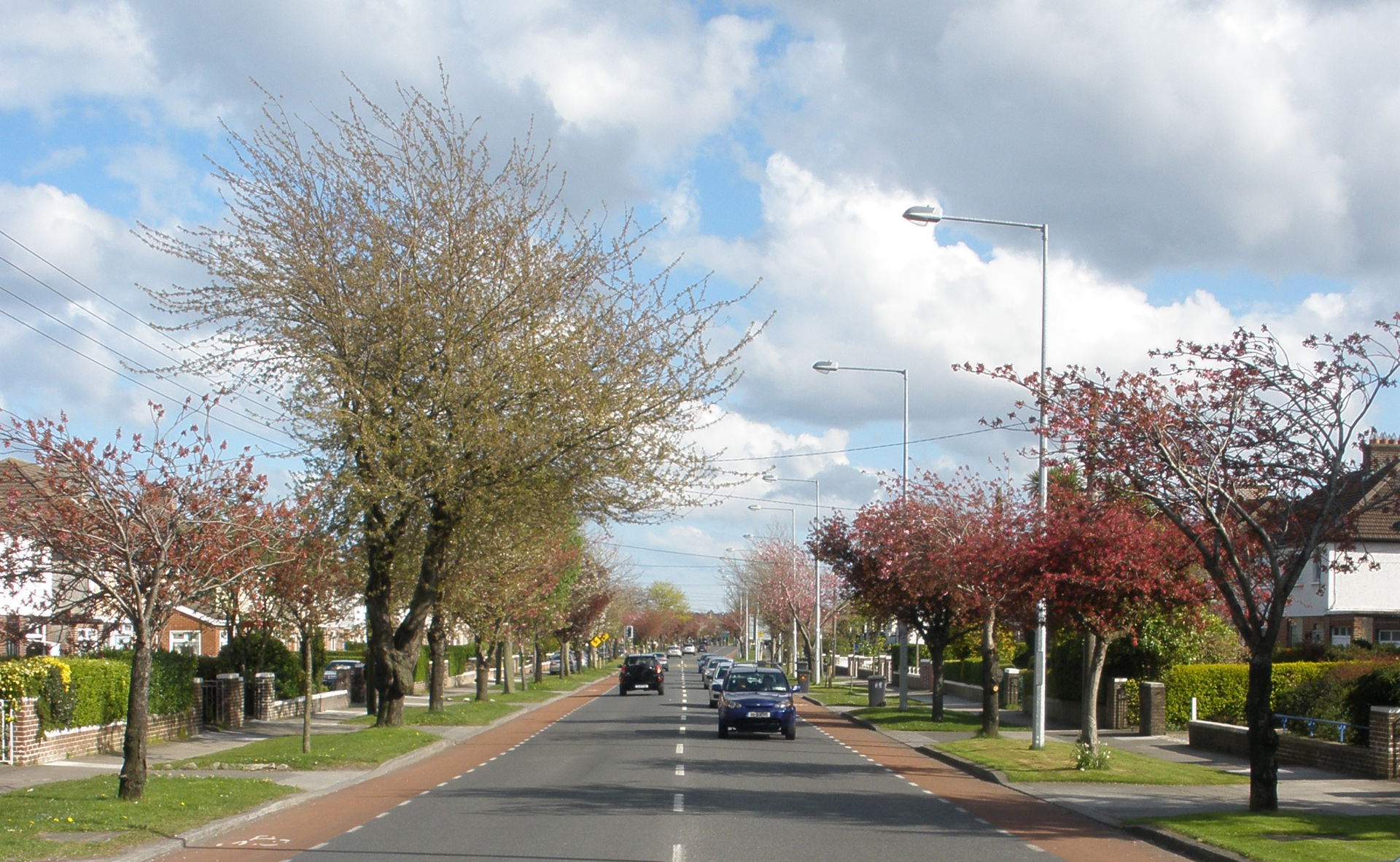
- R112 road with cycle lanes (red)

Route information
- Length: 15.2 km (9.4 mi)

Location
- Country: Ireland
- Primary destinations: Dublin City; Chapelizod (R148); Ballyfermot (R833); Crosses the Grand Canal (New Bridge); Kylemore (R810, R110, Luas Red Line); Walkinstown (R818, R819); South Dublin; Crosses the River Poddle; Templeogue (R817, R137); Crosses the River Dodder at Springfield Avenue; Crosses the Owendoher River; Rathfarnham (R114); Dún Laoghaire–Rathdown; Churchtown (R821); Crosses the River Slang; Dundrum (R117, Luas Green Line); Goatstown (R826, R825, R133); Mount Merrion (R138)

Highway system
- Roads in Ireland; Motorways; Primary; Secondary; Regional

The R112 road is a regional road in south Dublin, Ireland. It begins at the junction with the R148 road at Chapelizod and arcs southeastwards, then eastwards across the middle of south Dublin, ending at the Mount Merrion junction of the R138. The road is a single-carriageway, with cycle lanes on some stretches. Improvements to the road have been made over the last 10 years, the most significant being at Dundrum Cross where the road was widened to make room for the new Luas bridge and Dundrum bypass (R117 road).

The official description of the R112 from the Roads Act 1993 (Classification of Regional Roads) Order 2012 reads:

R112: Chapelizod - Churchtown - Mount Merrion, County Dublin

Between its junction with R148 at Chapelizod Bypass in the city of Dublin and its junction with R138 at Stillorgan Road in the county of Dun Laoghaire — Rathdown via Kylemore Road and Walkinstown Avenue in the city of Dublin: Saint Peters Road, Greentrees Road, Templeville Road and Springfield Avenue, Dodder View Road and Dodder Park Road in the county of South Dublin: Dodder Park Road, Braemor Road, Churchtown Road Upper, Taney Road, Mount Anville Road and Fosters Avenue in the county of Dun Laoghaire — Rathdown.

The R112 is 15.2 kilometres (9.4 mi) long (map of the road).

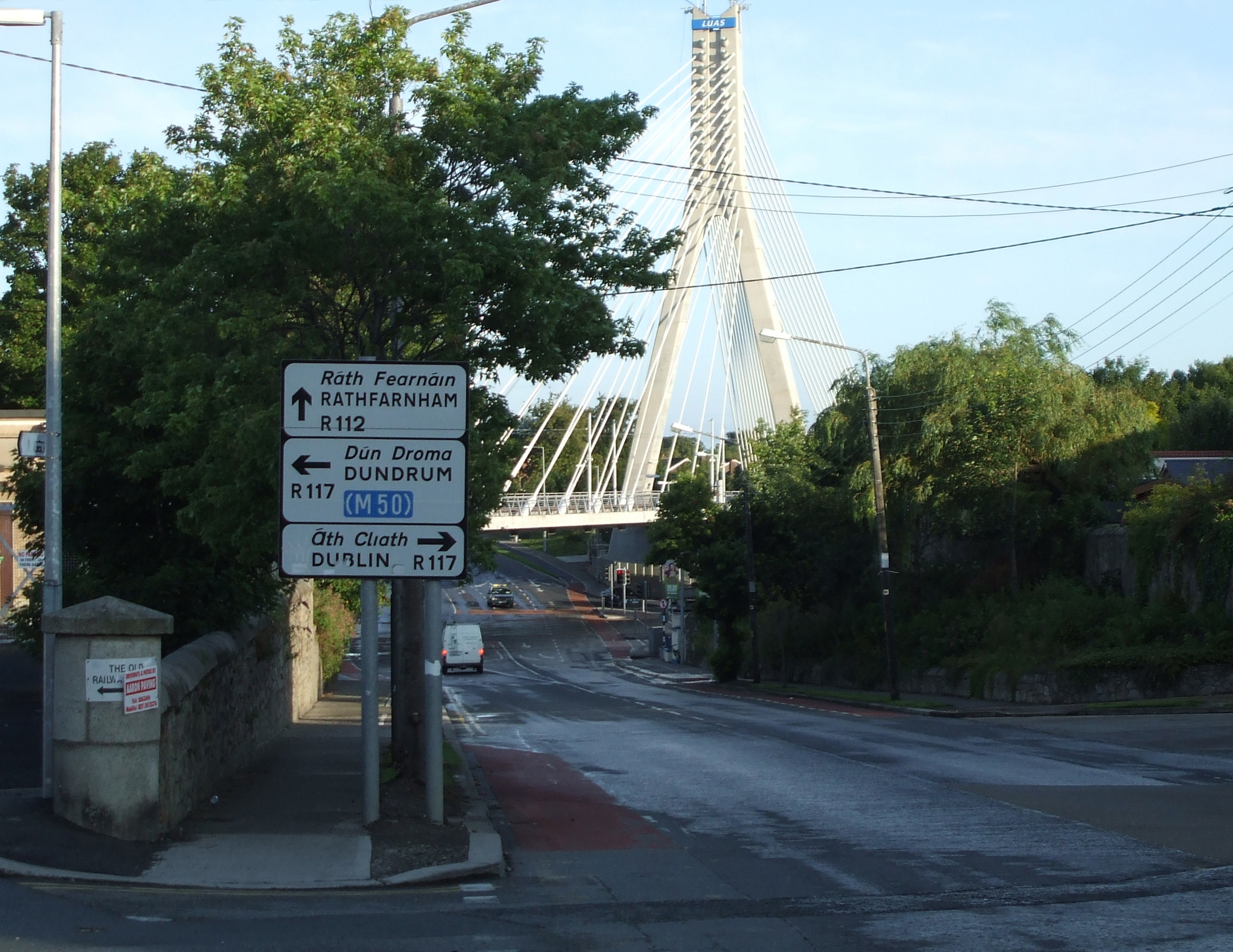
R112 looking west to crossroads at Dundrum and the Luas Dargan Bridge.

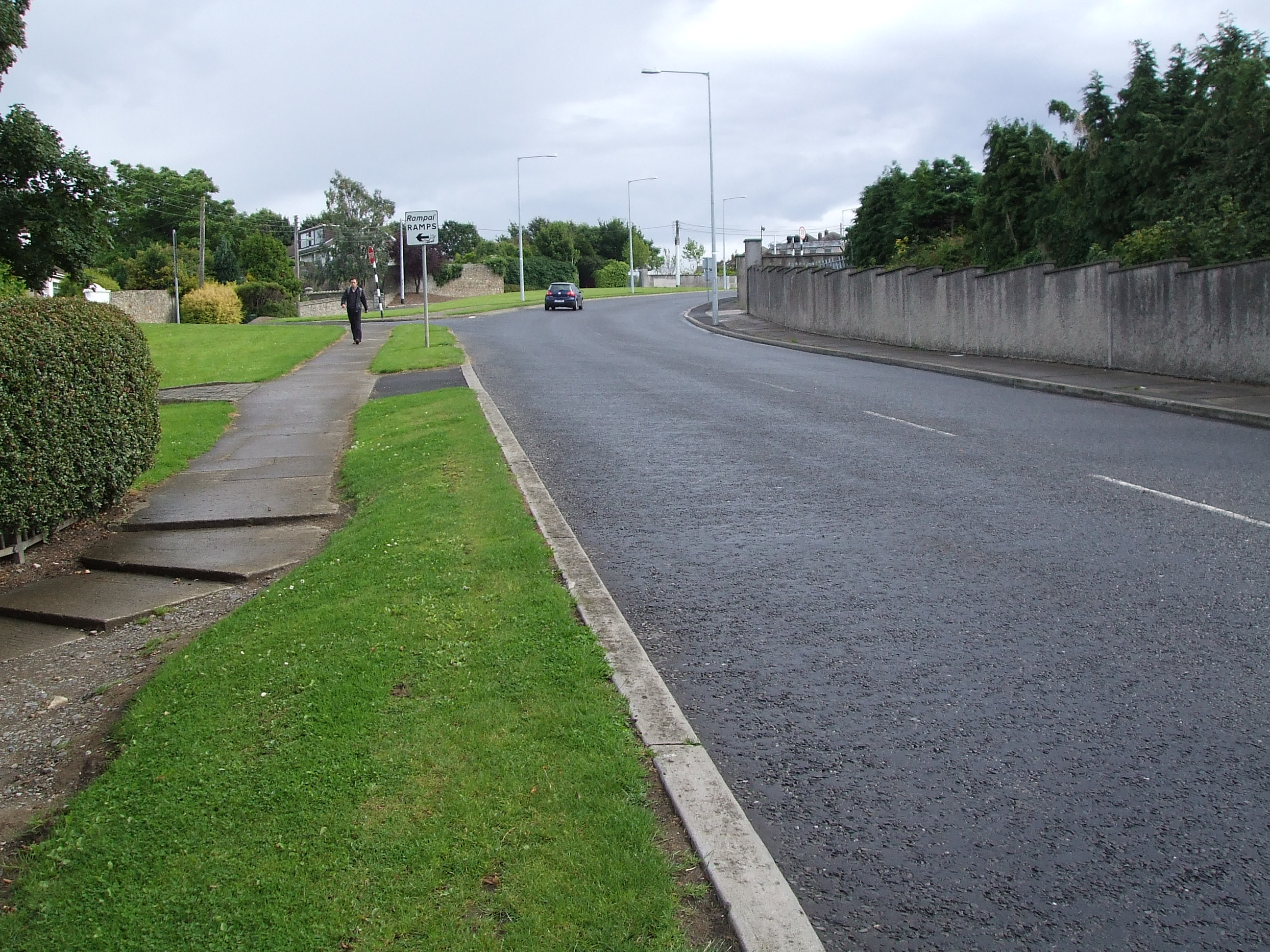
Mount Anville Road section of R112 due south between Mount Merrion and Goatstown. Deer Park entrance at left.

== Route ==
- The R112 begins at the junction of the R148 road at Chapelizod, heading a short distance to the east. It turns south and passes under the R148. The road is known as Kylemore Road at this point.
- Continues south through the R833 (Ballyfermot Road) roundabout.
- Crosses a bridge over the Dublin-Cork railway line.
- Crosses the Grand Canal.
- Major junction with the R810 (Naas Road). It crosses the Luas Red Line at this point and is named Walkinstown Avenue.
- Shortly after this there is another major junction with the R110 (Long Mile Road).
- Continues southeast through Walkinstown roundabout where the road connects with the R819 and R818. After the roundabout, the road becomes Saint Peter's Road.
- Road moves in a more easterly direction and is known as Greentrees Road after the junction with Limekiln Lane.
- Road becomes Templeville Road after a roundabout at the junction with Whitehall and Wellington Road. The road crosses the River Poddle 200m southeast of the Wellington Road roundabout or 50m northwest of the Grosvenor Road intersection. The presence of the river is not readily evident to passing motorists. Further on, it intersects the R817 at the Templeville roundabout. The 850m stretch between the Wellington and Templeville roundabouts was a greenfield area which was developed in the 1970s as a connecting road (including new housing) between Greentrees Road and Templeogue College.
- Major junction with R137 at Templeogue village.
- After the R137, it becomes Springfield Avenue where it crosses and then follows the winding River Dodder, with Bushy Park to the north. The road bridges the Owendoher River just before the tributary flows into the Dodder.
- After a junction with the R114 (which connects Terenure to Rathfarnham at this point) the R112 road becomes the Dodder Park Road, which later becomes the Braemor Road as it passes Churchtown.
- It then passes a junction with R821 (Nutgrove Avenue) and Beaumont Avenue and becomes the Upper Churchtown Road before a major junction at Dundrum, where the road intersects with the R117 and passes underneath the Luas bridge on the Green Line. It also bridges the Slang or Dundrum River at this point, though the bridge is barely noticeable.
- Past Dundrum, the road climbs steeply to Taney Church, and a T-junction with the R826, before a decline down to Goatstown. There, it meets another major junction with the R825 (Goatstown Road) to the south and R133 (Lower Kilmacud Road) to the north. The R112 road is known as Taney Road before the junction and Mount Anville Road afterwards.
- The Mount Anville Road passes Deer Park before another steep decline down to a small junction where the road becomes Foster Avenue. The road has UCD, Belfield to the north and Mount Merrion to the south before it terminates at a T-junction with the R138.

== Transport ==
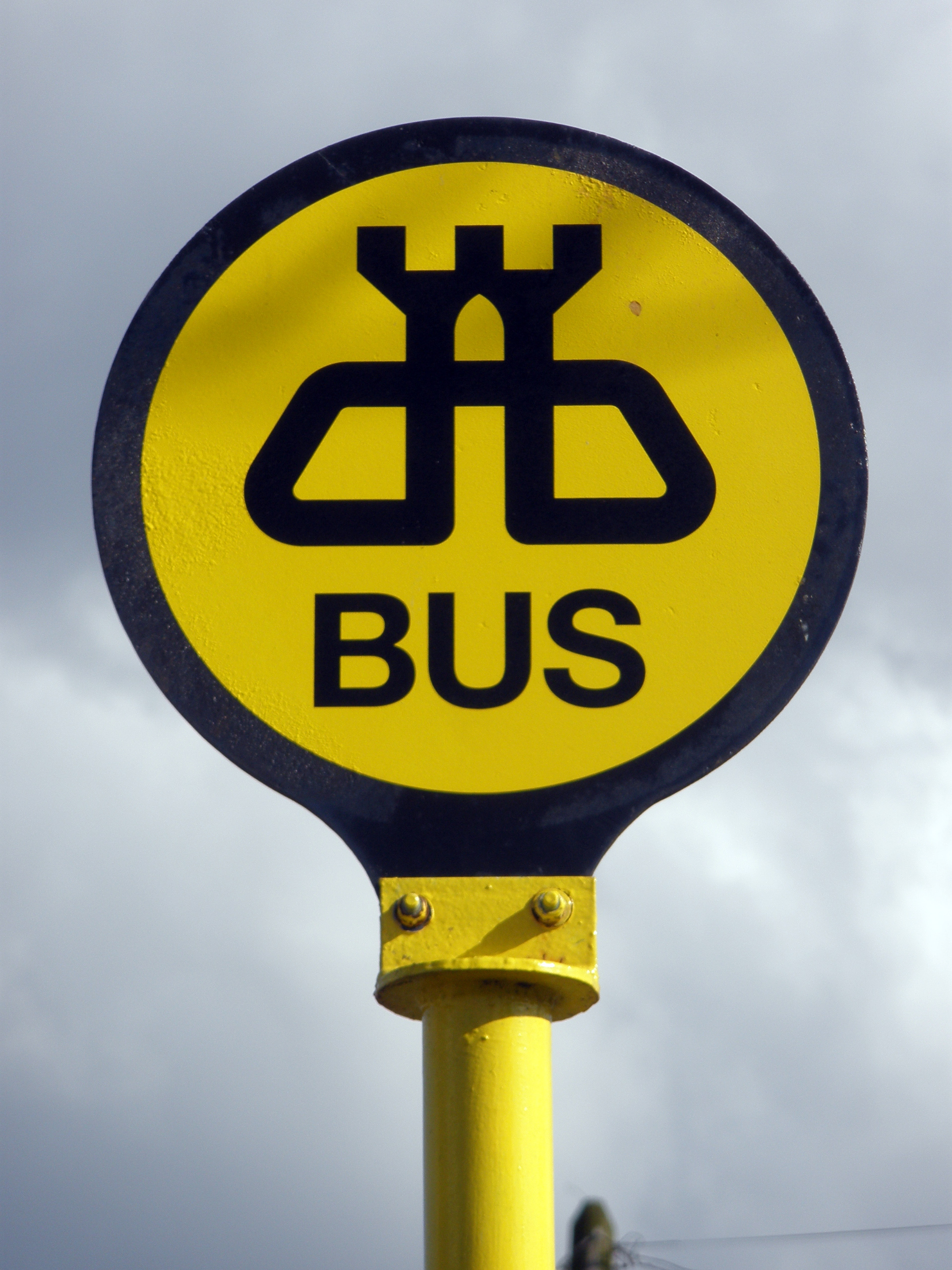
54A bus stop on the R112

The following bus routes use the R112:

- 26, L55 - Lucan Road & Kylemore Road
- 60, S4 - Kylemore Road (after Ballyfermot roundabout)
- 56A - Walkinstown Avenue
- 9 - Saint Peter's Road
- 54A - Templeville Road
- 14 - Braemor Road
- 161, S6 - Churchtown Road
- 47 - Foster's Avenue

An on-street bike lane starts at the Walkinstown roundabout and continues to Templeoge, at the junction of the R137. There, it changes to an off-street bike lane until the junction with the R114 road, where it switches back to an on-street lane. Following the junction at Ely Arch, there is an off-street bike lane until the crossroads at Dundrum. After this, only short stretches of the route have on-street bike lanes, though there are plans to add to this route in the proposed Goatstown development plan.

== Points of interest ==
- Ely's Arch
- Parks — Californian Hills Park (Ballyfermot), Walkinstown Avenue Park, Dodder Valley Park (Templeogue), Bushy Park (Terenure), Deer Park (Mount Merrion)
- Rivers — River Poddle, River Dodder
- Churches — St Nahi's (Dundrum), Taney Church (Dundrum), St Thomas' (Mount Merrion)
- Schools — Templeogue College, St. Pius X National School, Notre Dame de Missions (Churchtown), Mount Anville School
- Sports — Saint Mary's College RFC

== Upgrades ==
- Q4 2009 - Signage replaced along the route.
- Q4 2009 - Traffic lights replaced at Goatstown.
- Q3/4 2010 - Added bus lane west of Dundrum Cross.

== Future plans ==
A feasibility study has explored the idea of running the proposed Luas Line E along the Upper Churchtown Road from the existing Luas Green Line at Dundrum, before turning off to the R821 road, towards Nutgrove. However, this project is unlikely to proceed soon due to scarce revenue and doubts about the sustainability of the line. Currently, there are plans to upgrade the junction with the R821. The proposed Goatstown development plan is likely to make small changes to the road layout at that section of the route. In 2021, an orbital bus route was proposed along the R112 from Walkinstown to Blackrock.

== See also ==
- Roads in Ireland
- National primary road
- National secondary road
- Regional road
- List of streets and squares in Dublin

== External sources ==
- Doyle, Joseph W. (2012) [2008]. Ten Dozen Waters: The Rivers and Streams of County Dublin (5th ed.). Dublin, Ireland: Rath Eanna Research. pp. 1–50 + iv + map. ISBN 978-0-9566363-4-8.
