= R133 road (Ireland) =

Regional road in south Dublin, Ireland

R133 road
- Bóthar R133
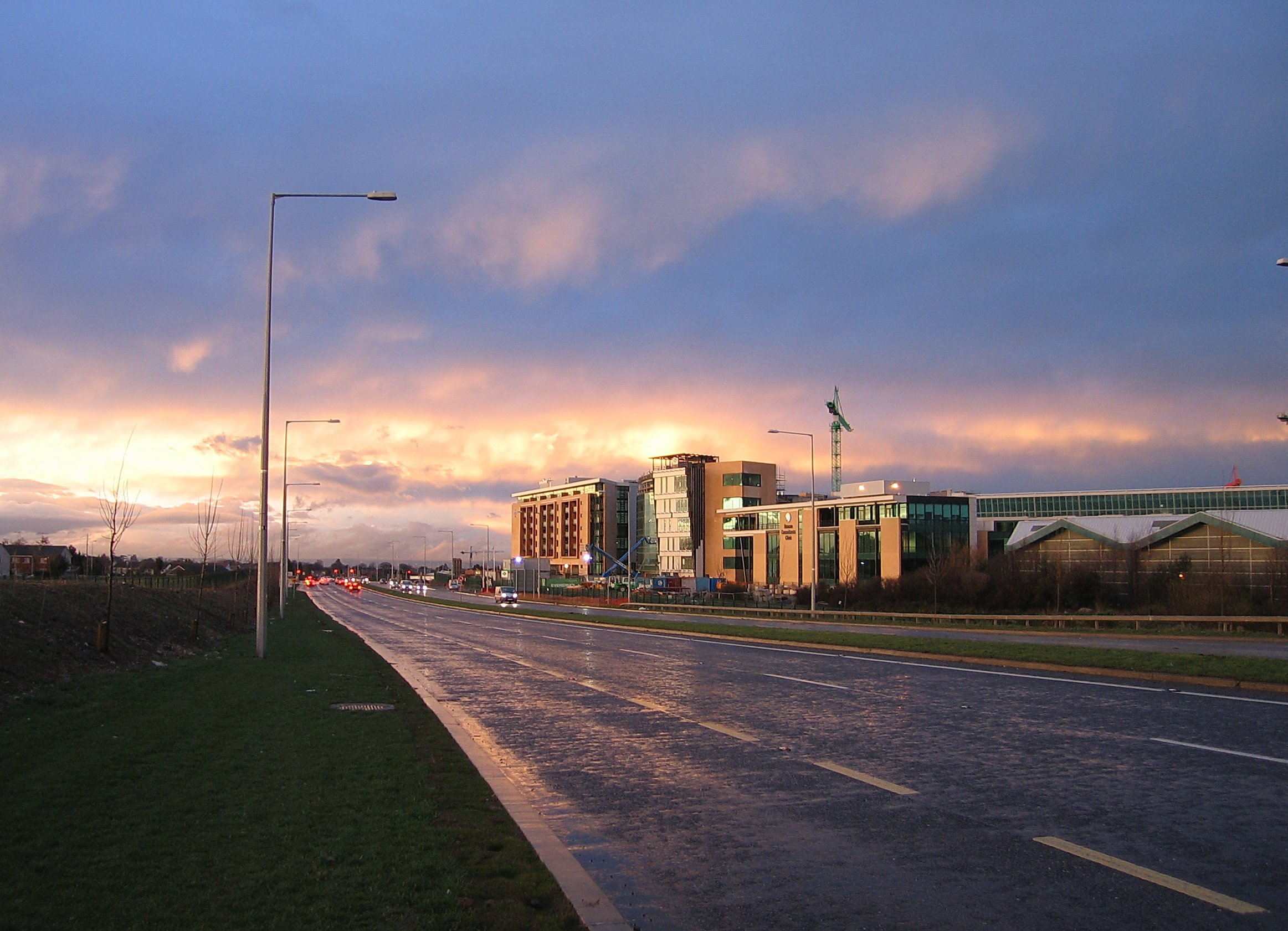
- R133 dual carriageway on Drummartin Link Road

Route information
- Length: 3.9 km (2.4 mi)

Location
- Country: Ireland
- Primary destinations: Dún Laoghaire–Rathdown; Goatstown (R112, R825); Drummartin (R825); Sandyford (M50 J13E, R113); Ballinteer (M50 J13W, R113, R826)

Highway system
- Roads in Ireland; Motorways; Primary; Secondary; Regional

The R133 road is a regional road in south Dublin, Ireland. The road starts at Goatstown and runs in a southerly direction towards Sandyford before acting as a link road for the M50.

== Route ==
Between its junction with R113 at Motorway Service Road and its junction with R112 at Mount Anville Road via Drummartin Link Road, Drummartin Road and Lower Kilmacud Road all in the county of Dun Laoghaire — Rathdown.

== See also ==
- Roads in Ireland
- National primary road
- National secondary road
