= R137 road (Ireland) =

Road between Dublin City and the M50 motorway in Ireland

R137 road
- Bóthar R137
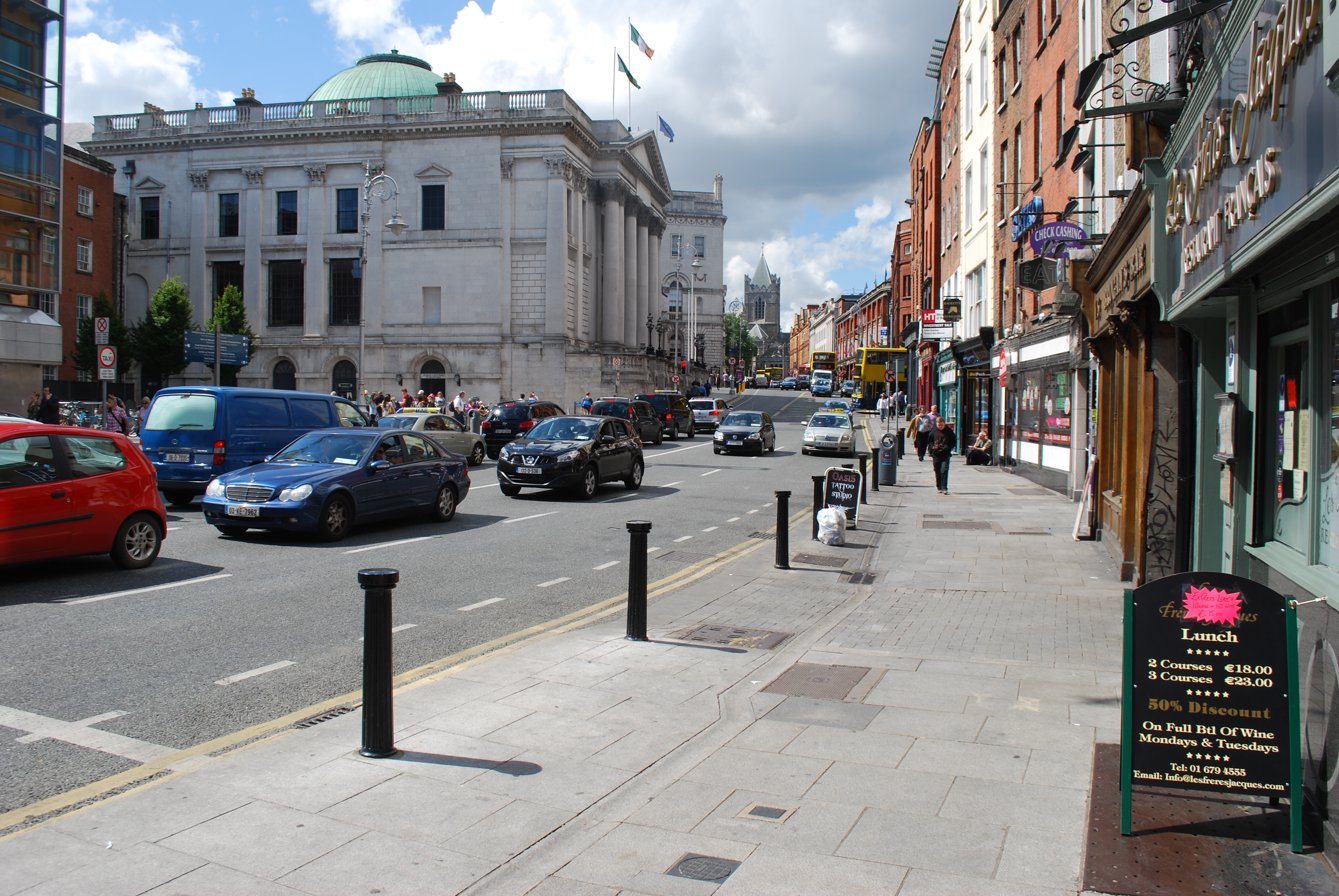
- Dame Street, Dublin, on the R137

Route information
- Length: 9.6 km (6.0 mi)

Location
- Country: Ireland
- Primary destinations: Dublin City; Dame Street (R138, R114, R108); Crosses the River Poddle; Patrick Street (R110); Clanbrassil Street (R811); Crosses the Grand Canal (R111); Harold's Cross (R817); Terenure (R114); South Dublin; Templeogue (R112); Meets the River Dodder (R817); M50, N81

Highway system
- Roads in Ireland; Motorways; Primary; Secondary; Regional

The R137 road is a road in Dublin, Ireland connecting College Green in the city centre to the junction of the M50 and N81 routes, via Dame Street, Patrick Street, Harold's Cross Road, Terenure Road North, and Templeogue Road.

The official definition of the R137 from the Roads Act, 1993 (Classification of Regional Roads) Order, 2012 states:

R137: Dame Street — Tallaght, County Dublin (Part old National Route 81)

Between its junction with R138 at Church Lane in the city of Dublin and its junction with M50 at Tymon North in the county of South Dublin via Dame Street, Cork Hill, Lord Edward Street, Christchurch Place, Nicholas Street, Patrick Street, New Street South, Clanbrassil Street Lower, Clanbrassil Street Upper, Harolds Cross Road, Terenure Road North, Terenure Place and Templeogue Road in the city of Dublin: and Templeogue Road and Tallaght Road in the county of South Dublin.

The road is 9.6 kilometres (6.0 mi) long (map of the route).

== See also ==
- Roads in Ireland
- National primary road
- National secondary road
- Regional road
