= R760 road (Ireland) =

Road in Ireland

R760 road
- Bóthar R760
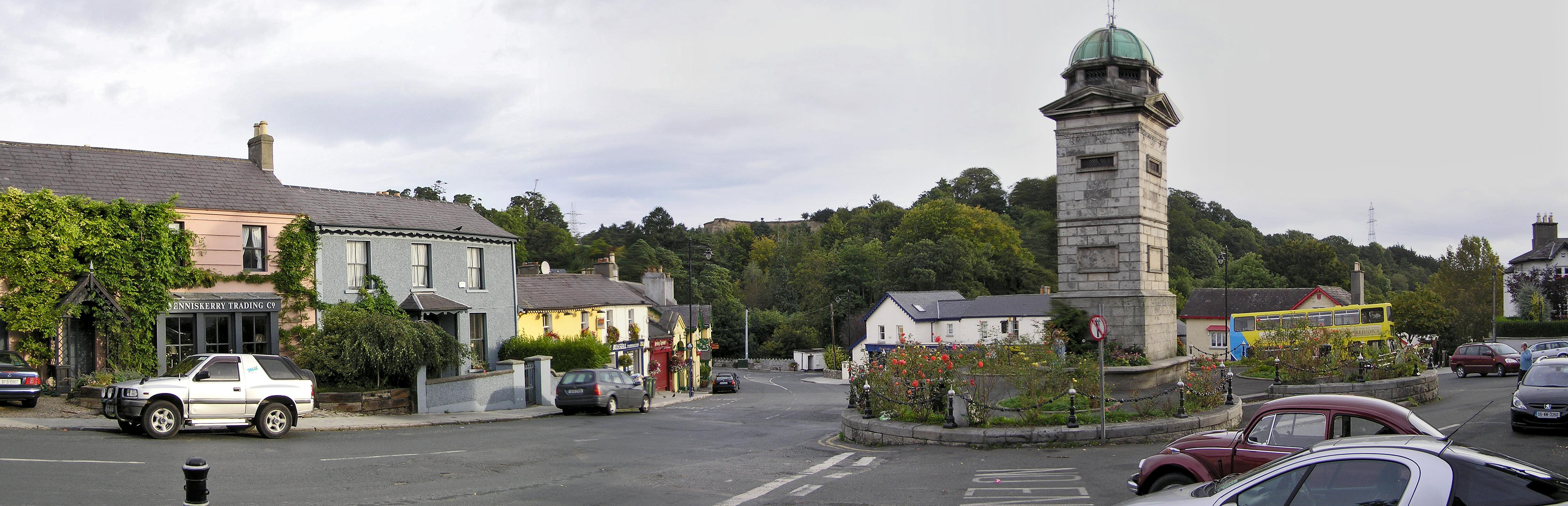
- R760 begins at The Square, Enniskerry

Route information
- Length: 4.8 km (3.0 mi)

Major junctions
- From: R117 at Enniskerry, County Wicklow
- Crosses River Dargle
- To: R755 at Killough

Location
- Country: Ireland

Highway system
- Roads in Ireland; Motorways; Primary; Secondary; Regional
← R759	→ R761

The R760 road is a regional road in County Wicklow, Ireland. It connects the R117 road in Enniskerry to the R755.

The R760 provides access to the Powerscourt Estate. The road is 4.8 km (3.0 mi) long.
