= R820 road (Ireland) =

Regional road in Dublin, Ireland

R820 road
- Bóthar R820

Route information
- Length: 2.5 km (1.6 mi)

Location
- Country: Ireland
- Primary destinations: Dublin; R114 (Rathgar Road); Rathmines Road Upper; Dartry Road; Milltown Road; R117 (Dundrum Road)

Highway system
- Roads in Ireland; Motorways; Primary; Secondary; Regional

The R820 road is a regional road in Dublin, Ireland.

The official definition of the R820 from the Roads Act 1993 (Classification of Regional Roads) Order 2006 states:

R820: Rathmines - Milltown, Dublin

Between its junction with R114 at Rathgar Road and its junction with R117 at Dundrum Road via Rathmines Road Upper, Dartry Road and Milltown Road all in the city of Dublin.

The road is 2.5 kilometres (1.6 mi) long.

== See also ==
- Roads in Ireland
- National primary road
- National secondary road
- Regional road
