= R819 road (Ireland) =

Road in Ireland

R819 road
- Bóthar R819
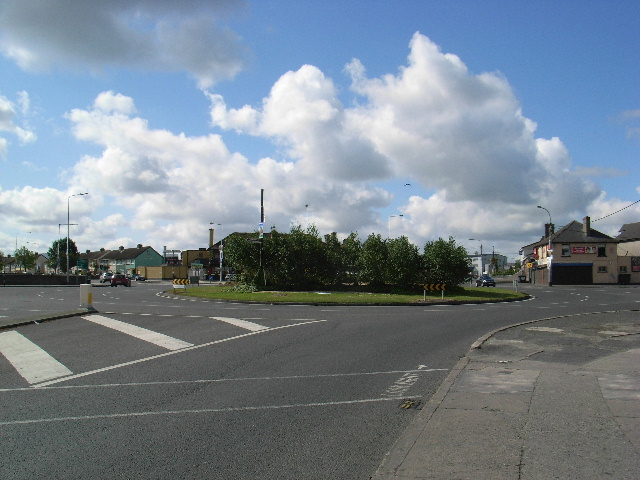
- Walkinstown Roundabout, on the R819

Route information
- Length: 5.1 km (3.2 mi)

Location
- Country: Ireland
- Primary destinations: County Dublin; R110 (Long Mile Road); Walkinstown Road; R112; South Dublin; Crosses M50 (no access); Greenhills Road; N81 (Tallaght Bypass)

Highway system
- Roads in Ireland; Motorways; Primary; Secondary; Regional

The R819 road is a regional road in Dublin, Ireland.

The official definition of the R819 from the Roads Act 1993 (Classification of Regional Roads) Order 2006 states:

R819: Long Mile Road - Tallaght, County Dublin

Between its junction with R110 at Long Mile Road in the city of Dublin and its junction with N81 at Tallaght Bypass in the town of Tallaght in the county of South Dublin via Walkinstown Road in the city of Dublin: and Greenhills Road in the county of South Dublin.

The road is 5.1 kilometres (3.2 mi) long.

== See also ==
- Roads in Ireland
- National secondary road
- Regional road
