= R826 road (Ireland) =

Regional road in south Dublin, Ireland

R826 road
- Bóthar R826
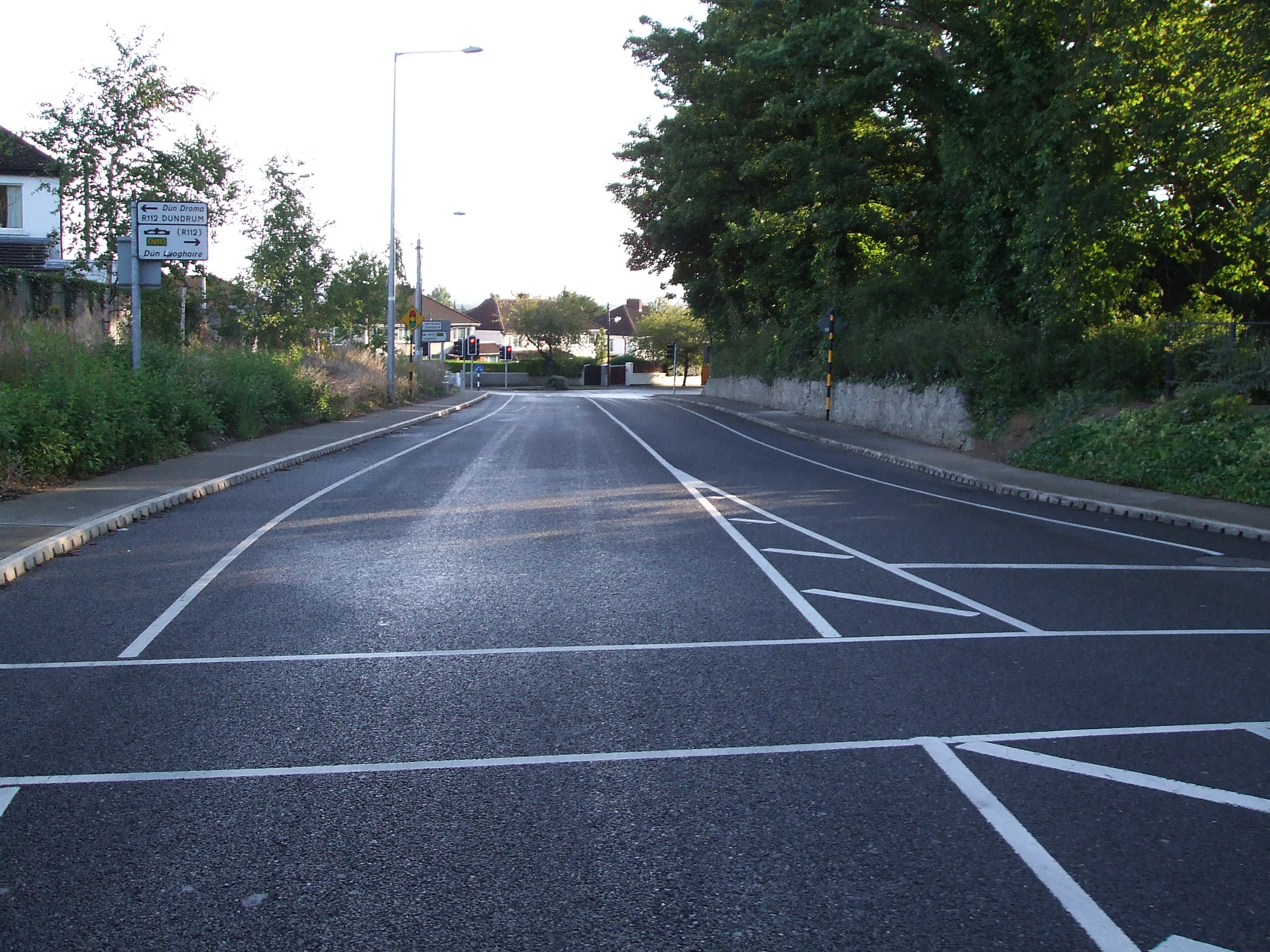
- R826 looking north to the junction with the R112 near Goatstown. This is where the R826 road terminates.

Route information
- Length: 2.5 km (1.6 mi)

Location
- Country: Ireland
- Primary destinations: Dún Laoghaire–Rathdown; Start in Sandyford at J13 of M50 (R113, R133); Ballinteer; Dundrum (R117); Balally (Luas Green Line); Goatstown (R112)

Highway system
- Roads in Ireland; Motorways; Primary; Secondary; Regional

The R826 road is a regional road in south Dublin, Ireland. The road runs from the Dundrum junction of the M50 (Junction 13) as passes through or near Ballinteer, Dundrum and Balally before terminating at the junction with the R112 close to Goatstown. The route runs on mostly new road, built to facilitate the M50 and Dundrum Town Center and is 2.5 km (1.5 miles) long.

== Route ==
- Starts at Junction 13 of the M50 on a roundabout that links with the R113 and R133 and heads in a southerly direction. The road is known as the Balinteer Road until another roundabout 750 M further where the Ballinteer Road continues to the West while the R826 continues south as the Wyckham Way.
- The Wyckham Way section of the road has Bus lanes running each direction and again links with the Ballinteer Road at a roundabout before the fourth and final roundabout on the route where the road links up the R117 and an entrance to the Dundrum Town Center.
- A short distance later is a signalised crossroads where the road intersects the Sandyford Road (R117 heading south, local road heading north). The road also crosses the Luas Green Line just beyond the junction and there is a turn for the Balally Luas Station car park.
- At this point the road is known as Overend Way as it passes beside Airfield. There is then another signaled junction where the road meets the Upper Kilmacud Road and passes on to Birches Lane. The route terminates at a T-junction with the R112 close to Goatstown.

== See also ==
- Roads in Ireland
- National primary road
- National secondary road
