= R117 road (Ireland) =

Road in Ireland

Coordinates: 53°13′04″N 6°10′47″W

R117 road
- Bóthar R117
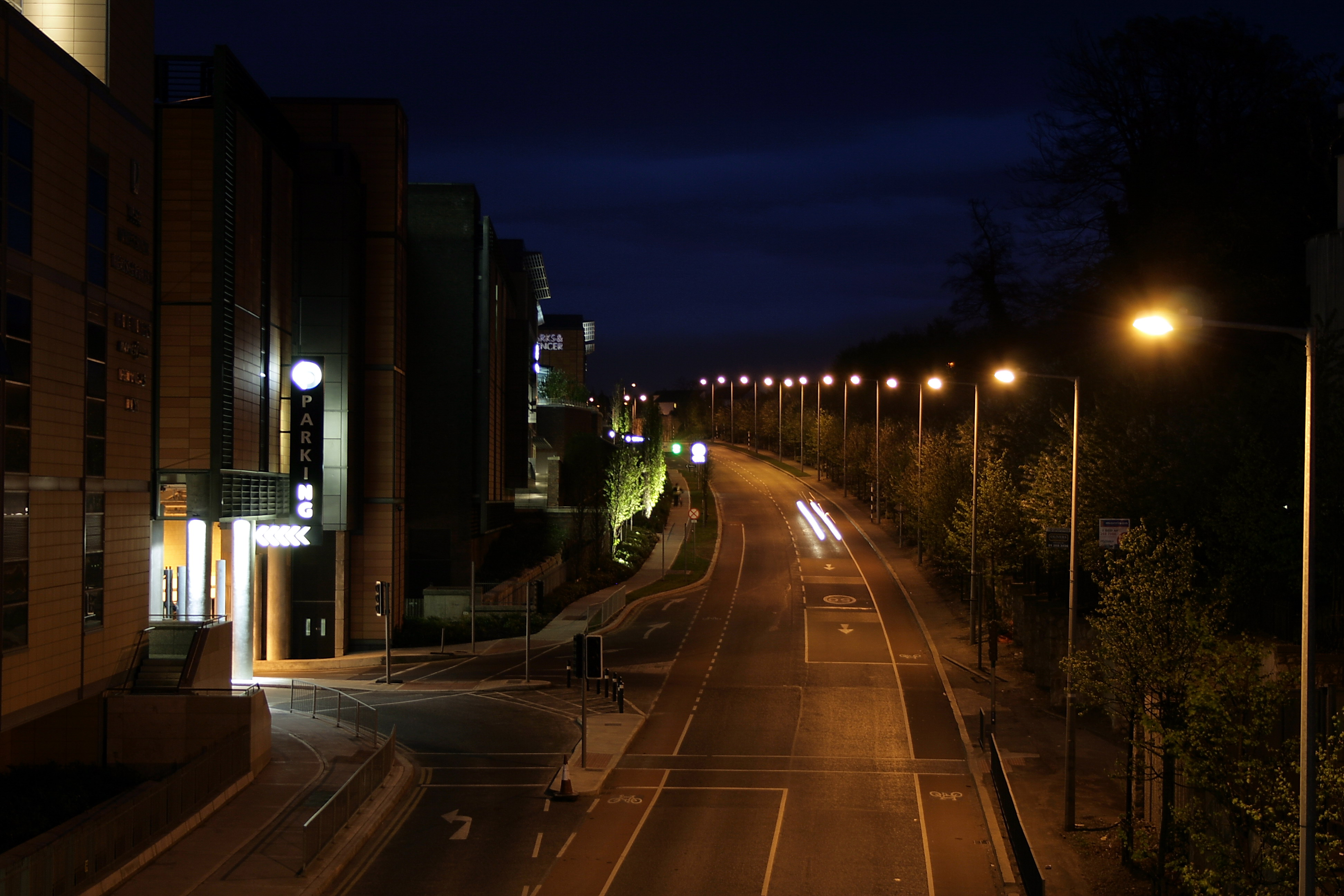
- Dundrum Bypass

Route information
- Length: 21 km (13 mi)

Location
- Country: Ireland
- Primary destinations: Dublin City; Start of route at junction of Harcourt Road and Charlemont Street (R114); Crosses the Grand Canal at Charlemont Bridge; Charlemont (R111, J55 DOOR); Ranelagh; Sandford/Clonskeagh (R824, R825); Milltown (R820); Crosses the River Dodder at Milltown Bridge; Dún Laoghaire–Rathdown; Windy Arbour; Dundrum (R112, Luas Green Line, R826); Balally; Crosses the M50. No access to motorway.; Sandyford; Stepaside; Kilternan (R842, R116); Wicklow; Enniskerry (R760); Crosses the River Dargle; Route terminates at Junction 7 of N11

Highway system
- Roads in Ireland; Motorways; Primary; Secondary; Regional

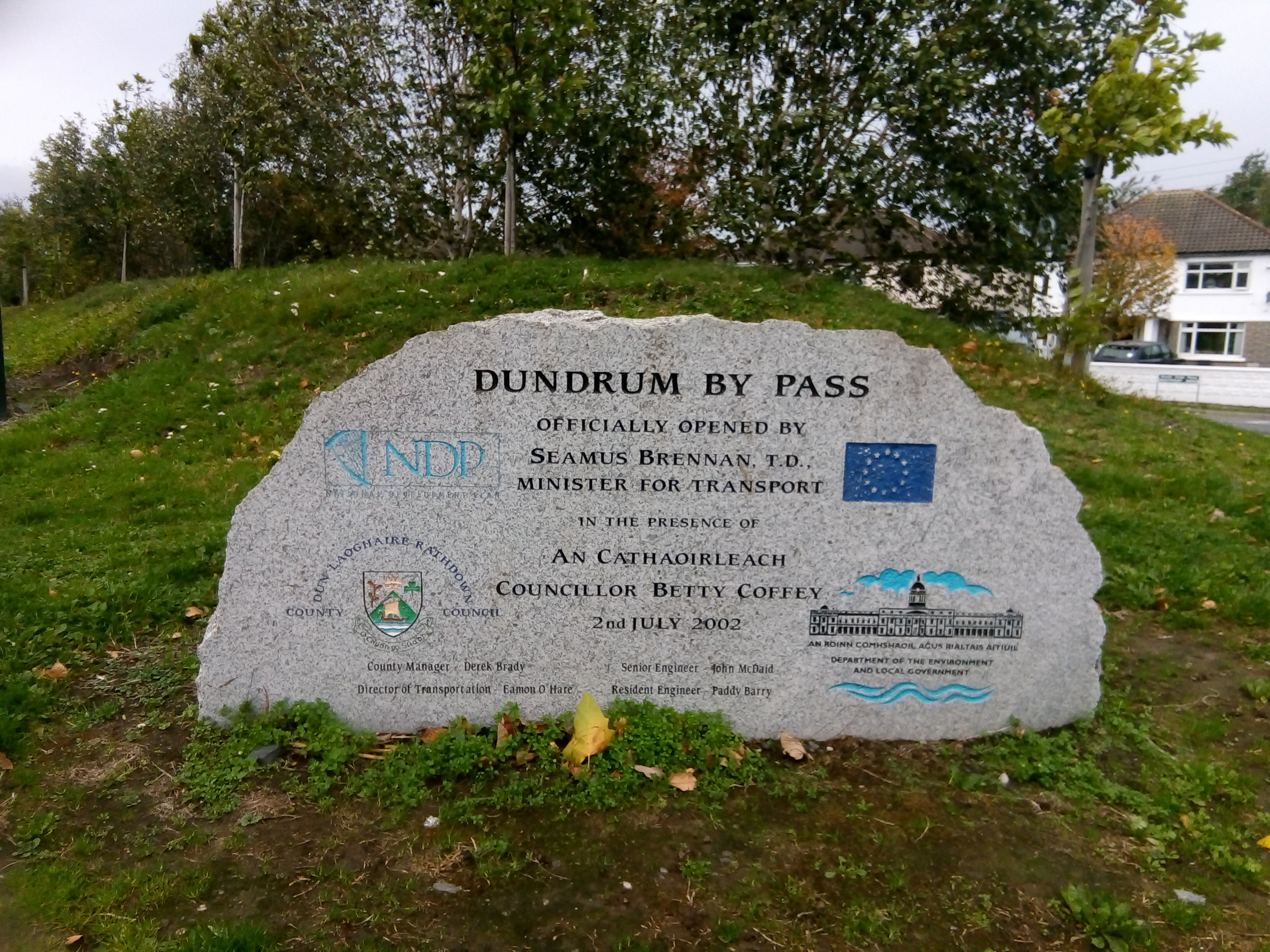
Sign on the R117 marking the Dundrum bypass

The R117 road is a regional road in Ireland. The route (north-south) starts Harcourt Road at the end of the South Circular Road on the southside of Dublin city centre. It crosses the Grand Canal and goes through the suburbs of Ranelagh, Milltown, Windy Arbour, Dundrum, Sandyford, Stepaside and Kilternan (where it crosses the R116) before passing through the Scalp into County Wicklow.

In Wicklow it goes through Enniskerry where it veers east to the N11 at Fassaroe just west of Bray, this part of the road is colloquially known as "The 21 Bends".

The official description of the R117 from the Roads Act 1993 (Classification of Regional Roads) Order 2012 reads:

R117: Dublin – Enniskerry – Kilcroney, County Wicklow

Between its junction with R114 at Harcourt Road in the city of Dublin and it junction with N11 at Kilcroney in the county of Wicklow via Charlemont Street, Ranelagh Road, Ranelagh, Sandford Road and Milltown Road in the city of Dublin: Dundrum Road; Dundrum Bypass, Sandyford Road, Ballally, Stepaside, Golden Ball, Kiltiernan, Glenamuck South and Enniskerry Road in the county of DunLaoghaire – Rathdown: The Scalp at the boundary between the county of DunLaoghaire – Rathdown and the county of Wicklow: Killegar, Knocksink, Enniskerry and Cookstown in the county of Wicklow.

== Transport ==
Most of the route is covered by the 44 bus operated by Dublin Bus. The bus route does not use the Dundrum bypass, instead running through the village, and also terminates at Enniskerry village and not at the N11.

== See also ==
- Roads in Ireland
- National primary road
- National secondary road
- Regional road
