= N81 road (Ireland) =

Road connecting M50 motorway to Tullow in Ireland

N81 road
- Bóthar N81
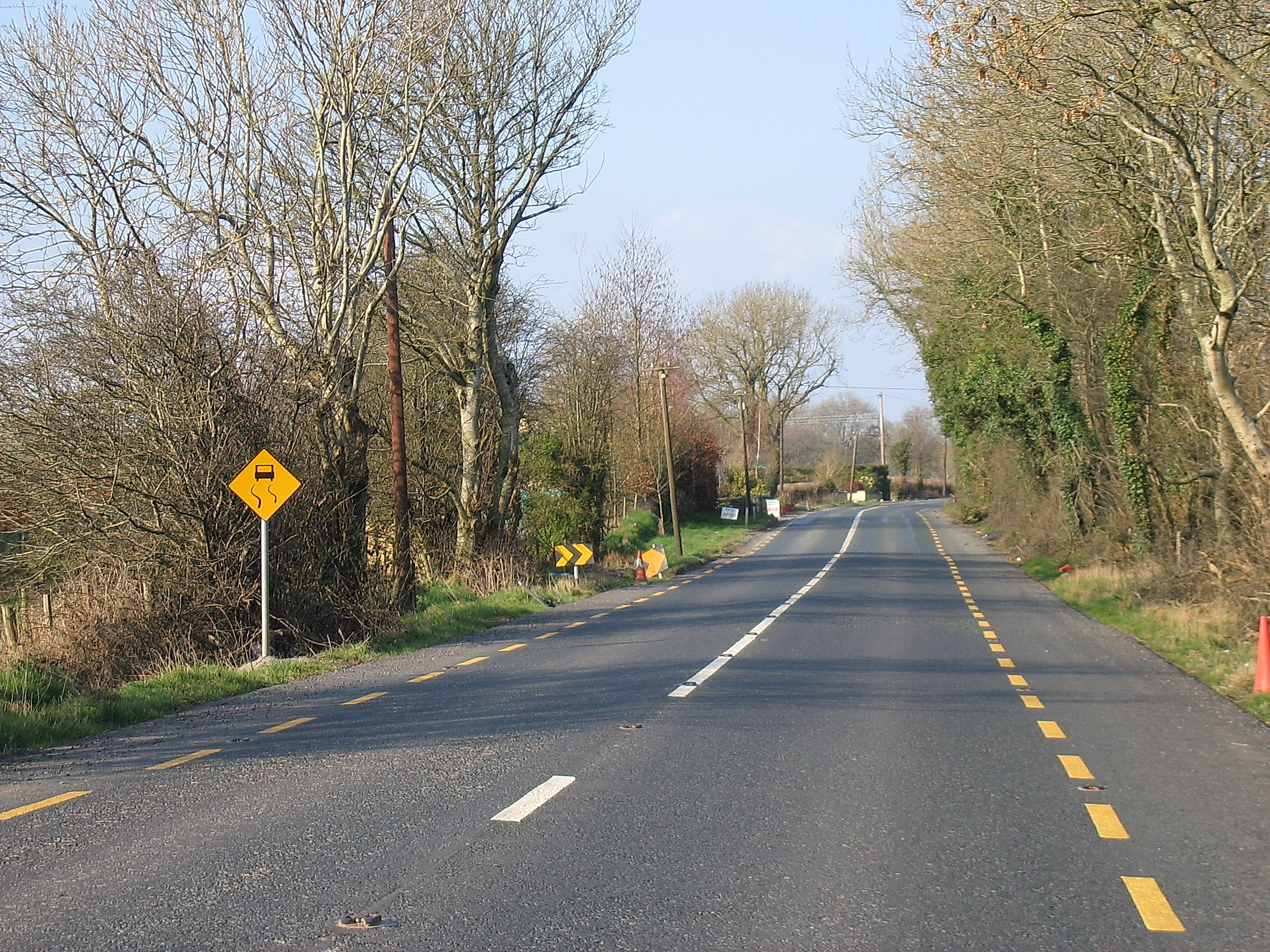
- N81 south of Hollywood, County Wicklow

Route information
- Length: 76.784 km (47.711 mi)

Location
- Country: Ireland
- Primary destinations: County Dublin; Tallaght (M50-J11, R819, R113, R136, R137); Brittas (R114); County Wicklow; Blessington (R410, R758); Hollywood (R411, R756); Ballylion (R412); Baltinglass (R747); County Carlow; Rathvilly (R726); Tullow (R725); Closh Cross (N80)

Highway system
- Roads in Ireland; Motorways; Primary; Secondary; Regional

The N81 road is a national secondary road in Ireland, from the M50 motorway to Tullow, County Carlow, north to south. The N81 continues past Tullow for another 8 km to terminate at the village of Closh, County Carlow, where it intersects the N80. The N81 is 76.784 km (47.711 mi) long (route map). The road is a dual carriageway between M50 motorway and west of Tallaght, known as the Tallaght Bypass or Blessington Road. It intersects with the M50 motorway at Junction 11. There are plans to extend the dual carriageway by 5 km (3.1 mi) to the urban boundary.

The N81 is the only major national road emanating from Dublin that is a national secondary rather than national primary road.

The official definition of the N81 from the Roads Act, 1993 (Declaration of National Roads) Order, 2012 states:

N81: Dublin — Closh Cross, County Carlow

Between its junction with M50 at Templeogue in the county of South Dublin and its junction with N80 at Closh Cross in the county of Carlow via Tallaght Bypass, Blessington Road, Jobstown, Kiltalown, Gibbons, Corbally, Crooksling and Brittas in the county of South Dublin: Moanaspick, Tinode; Main Street at Blessington; and Burgage More in the county of Wicklow: Glebe East in the county of Kildare: Burgage Moyle and Russborough in the county of Wicklow; Bishopslane and Horsepasstown in the county of Kildare: Poulaphoca Bridge at the boundary between the county of Kildare and the county of Wicklow: Hollywood Lower, Hollywood Cross, Whitestown, Castleruddery; Mill Street and Edward Street at Baltinglass; and Holdenstown Lower in the county of Wicklow: Bough, Rathvilly, Kilmagarvoge; Dublin Road, Church Street, Market Square, Bridge Street and Abbey Street in the town of Tullow; and Castlegrace in the county of Carlow.

== History ==
=== Tallaght to Brittas section ===
In her 1999 publication South County Scrapbook, Mary McNally of Tallaght Historical Society noted that: "There was no road between the Embankment and Crooksling (route of the present-day N81) until about 1820 when British Army Engineers made the present road. Before 1790, the travellers going from Dublin to Blessington, Carlow and Wexford turned left at Kiltalown Cottages and climbed the steep road over Mount Seskin joining the present road (N81) at Brittas."

The section of the N81 south of Tallaght which circles Verschoyle's Hill (386m), was once the site of highwaymen, which academic Francis Elrington Ball wrote of in 1904:

The opening of the eighteenth century found this district still very wild and uncivilized, and the old coach road to Blessington which passed over Tallaght Hill, was a great resort of highwaymen. At the foot of this hill, on the Blessington side, there stood an inn, called the Red Cow, which, in the month of December, 1717, was the scene of a sanguinary encounter between a party of rapparees, who seem to have had the surrounding country at their mercy, and the forces of the Crown.

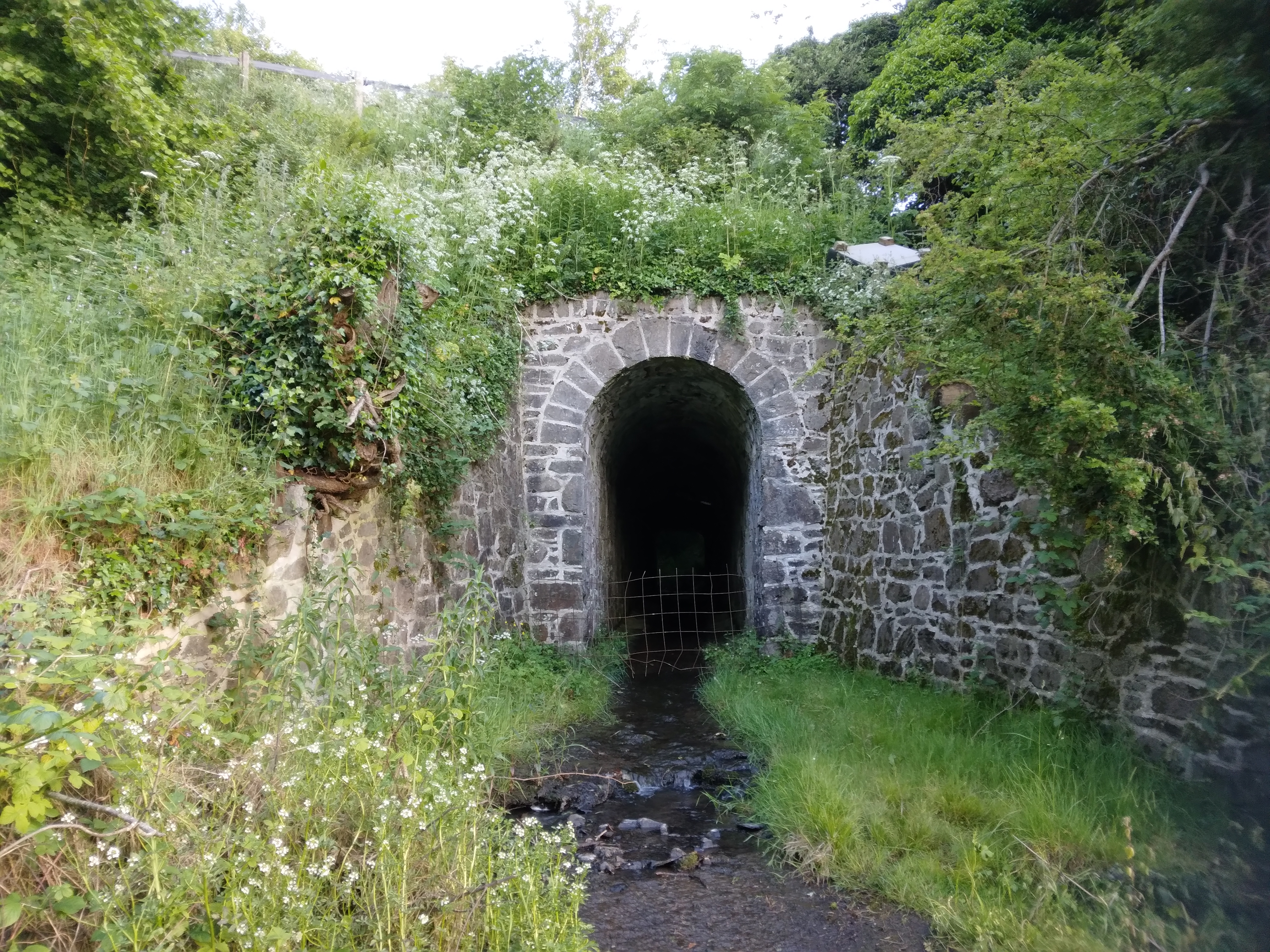
Corbally Bridge, supporting the N81 road at The Embankment, outside Tallaght

In his 1877 book The History and Antiquities of Tallaght in the County of Dublin (reprinted in 1899), William Domville Handcock made note of a pillar stone, or gallán, which "stands opposite Mount Seskin in the loop formed by the new Tallaght road going round Tallaght Hill from Kiltalown to Brittas (the modern N81 road) and the old steep road between those places (the L7377 Mount Seskin road)".

=== Trunk Road status and after ===
The N81 route was previously known as the T42 (trunk road), trunk roads being a classification used in Ireland between 1926 and 1977.

The Dublin and Blessington Steam Tramway once took this route from Terenure to Blessington before it was closed in 1932 due to falling passenger numbers.

In the 1990s when it was proposed to re-establish a tram system in Dublin due to chronic traffic congestion (see Luas), the old tram route from the city centre via Terenure to Tallaght was proposed.

This route was later ruled out as a result of space constraints and the pipes under the N81 route seemingly being too old in the Terenure area, thus proving to be a great deal more expensive for utility diversion. The Luas instead was made to follow a less direct route from the City to Tallaght, following the Southern Canal ring and then moving south to Tallaght alongside the M50 Motorway.

== Planned upgrade ==
In a Dáil Éireann debate dated 2 July 2019 it was mentioned that the N81 is one of the most dangerous roads in the State with twice the national average for single vehicle collisions and seven times the national average of head-on collisions.

In 2021 Minister for Transport Eamon Ryan mentioned that the N81 Tallaght to Hollywood Cross road improvement scheme was not included in the projects to be developed during the current NDP period of 2018–2027, in effect pausing any work on the project until after this date.

== See also ==
- Roads in Ireland
- Motorways in Ireland
- National primary road
- Regional road
- List of streets and squares in Dublin

== Sources ==
- Ball, Francis Elrington (1 December 1904). A History of the County of Dublin: The People, Parishes and Antiquities from the Earliest Times to the Close of the Eighteenth Century. Part Third (PDF). Dublin: Alex. Thom & Co. (Limited), Abbey-St.
- Domville Handcock, William (1877). The History and Antiquities of Tallaght in the County of Dublin (PDF). Dublin: Hodges, Figgis, & Co., Ltd., 104 Grafton Street.
- McNally, Mary (1 January 1999). South County Scrapbook - History of South Dublin County. Tallaght: Tallaght Historical Society.
