= Mary Beckett =

Irish writer

- Born: 1926; Belfast, Northern Ireland
- Died: 2013 (aged 86–87); Dublin, Ireland
- Education: St. Mary's Teacher Training College
- Occupation: Author
- Children: 5
- Writing career
- Notable works: Give Them Stones; A Belfast Woman; A Literary Woman
- Notable awards: 1987 The Sunday Tribute Arts Award for Literature

Mary Beckett (1926–2013) was an Irish author.

== Biography ==
She was born in Belfast. She attended St. Dominic's High School and then proceeded to St. Mary's Teacher Training College. She married and moved to Dublin where she worked as a teacher. She had five children.

== Writing career ==
In the 1950s, she wrote radio plays for BBC Northern Ireland and had several short stories published.

It was not until she was in her fifties that she began publish again. Her first was a collection of her earlier short stories entitled A Belfast Woman (1980). This was followed by A Literary Woman (1990). She also wrote a novel entitled Give them Stones (1987), and several children's books including Orla was Six, Orla at School, A Family Tree, and Hannah, or the Pink Balloons.
