= William Dargan Bridge =

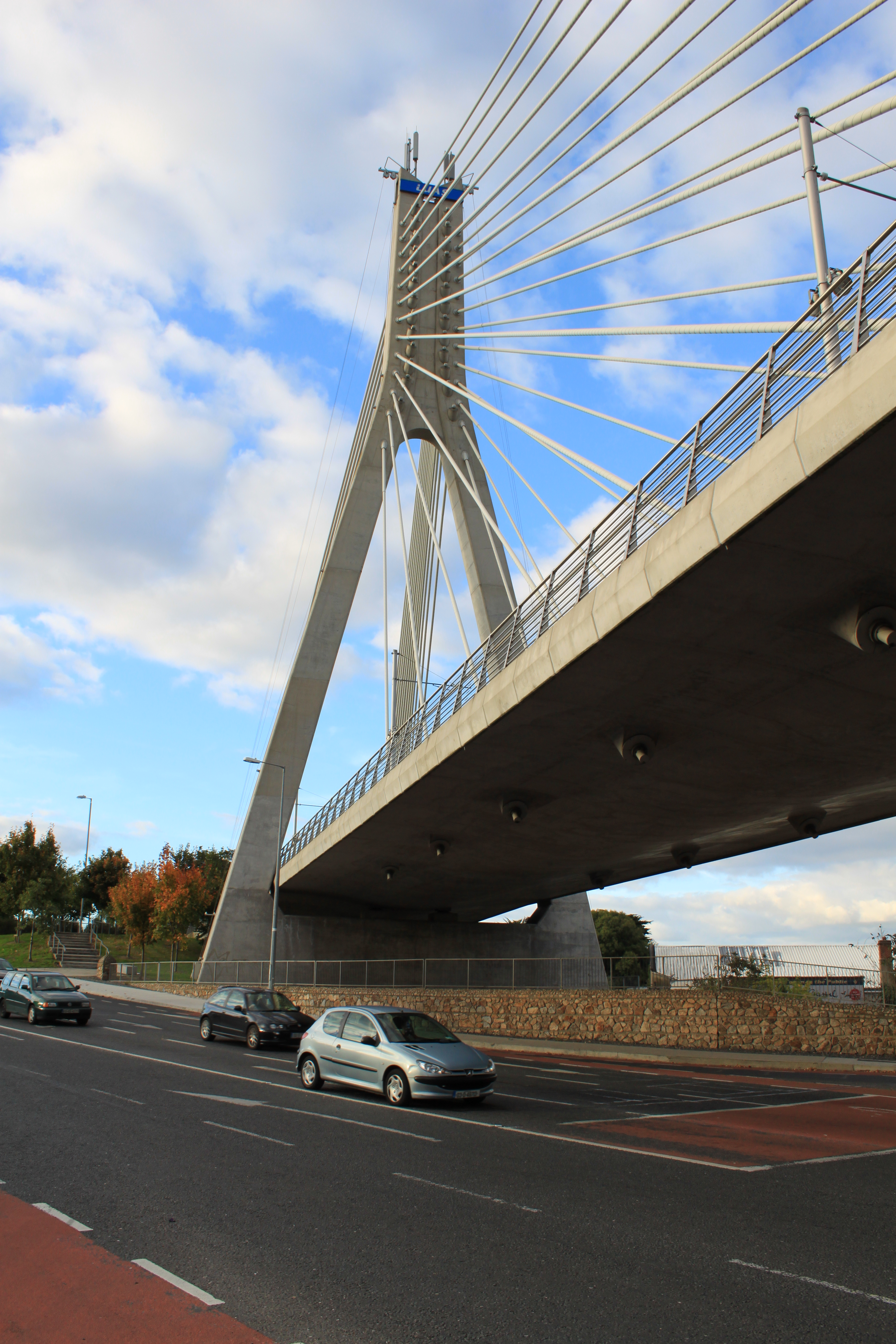
- Coordinates: 53°17′35.28″N 6°14′45.72″W
- Other name: Dundrum Luas Bridge
- Named for: William Dargan

Characteristics
- Material: Concrete
- Total length: 162 metres
- Height: 50 metres
- No. of spans: 21.5, 108.5, 18.0 and 14.0 metres

Rail characteristics
- No. of tracks: 2
- Track gauge: 1,435mm

History
- Inaugurated: 19 July 2004

Location
- Interactive map of William Dargan Bridge

William Dargan Bridge, informally Dundrum Luas Bridge, opened in 2004, is a 162 metre cable-stayed bridge in Dundrum, Dublin, Ireland. It carries the Green Line of the Luas over the busy Taney junction, of the R112 and R117 regional roads as well as the little-known Slang River. The bridge connects rail alignments which were formerly part of the Harcourt Street railway line, and also carries a footpath connecting the Dundrum Luas stop to Churchtown.

The name commemorates William Dargan. The engineer who designed the Harcourt Street railway line, which much of the Green Line now follows.

Roughan & O’Donovan provided full engineering design services for the bridge.

== History ==
Construction started in October 2001. The deck, 1.325 metres deep, was constructed using precast concrete shell segments that were glued and stressed together, before being filled with in-situ concrete. The 50 metre high pylon was made using reinforced concrete and 13 pairs of high-tensile steel cables.

Construction was completed on 2 August 2002, where, in front of several hundred onlookers, Minister for Transport Seamus Brennan remotely tightened a stress block. The entire project had an approximate cost of €11 million. The first Luas passed over the bridge on 11 Feb 2004 during a test of the line.

Adverts were placed in local media looking for suggestions on what to name the bridge. The final name was chosen by a committee set up by the Railway Procurement Agency. It included the Luas chief architect, Jim Quinlan, historian Briain MacAonghusa and a representative of South Dublin County Council. Proposals included; William Dargan, Stephen Roche, Canon Harrington, and Suas Luas (suas being the Irish word for "up"). The bridge was official named the William Dargan Bridge by Seamus Brennan in a public ceremony on 19 July 2004. Where a ribbon was cut by Fr Dan Dargan, the great-grandson of William Dargan.

After the death of Seamus Brennan in July 2008, Fianna Fáil councilor Gerry Horkan proposed the bridge should be renamed after him, which was turned down.

== Awards ==
- Irish Concrete Society Infrastructural Category Award 2002
- Association of Consulting Engineers of Ireland President’s Award for Excellence 2003

== Gallery ==
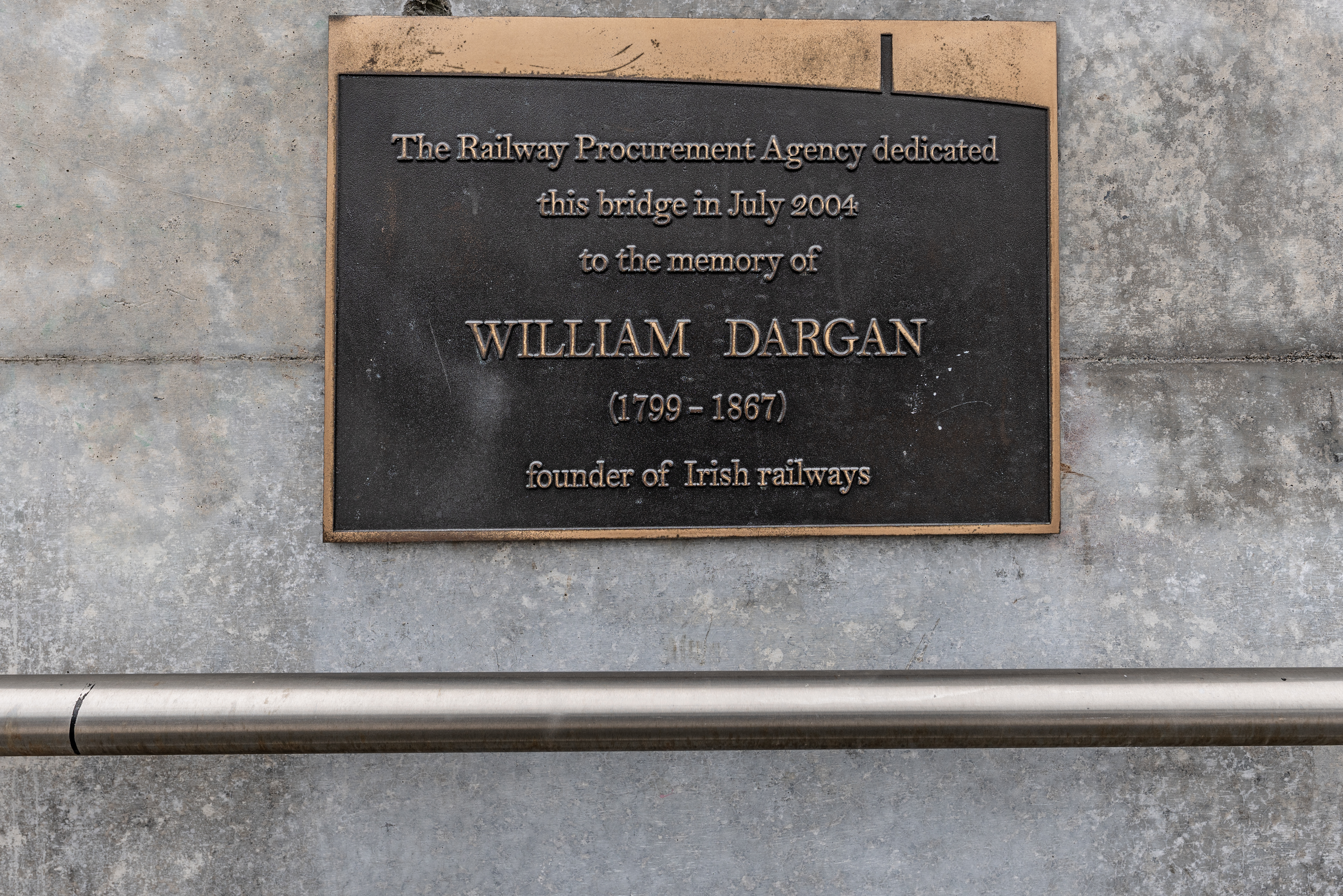
Plaque commemorating William Dargan on the base of the pylon.

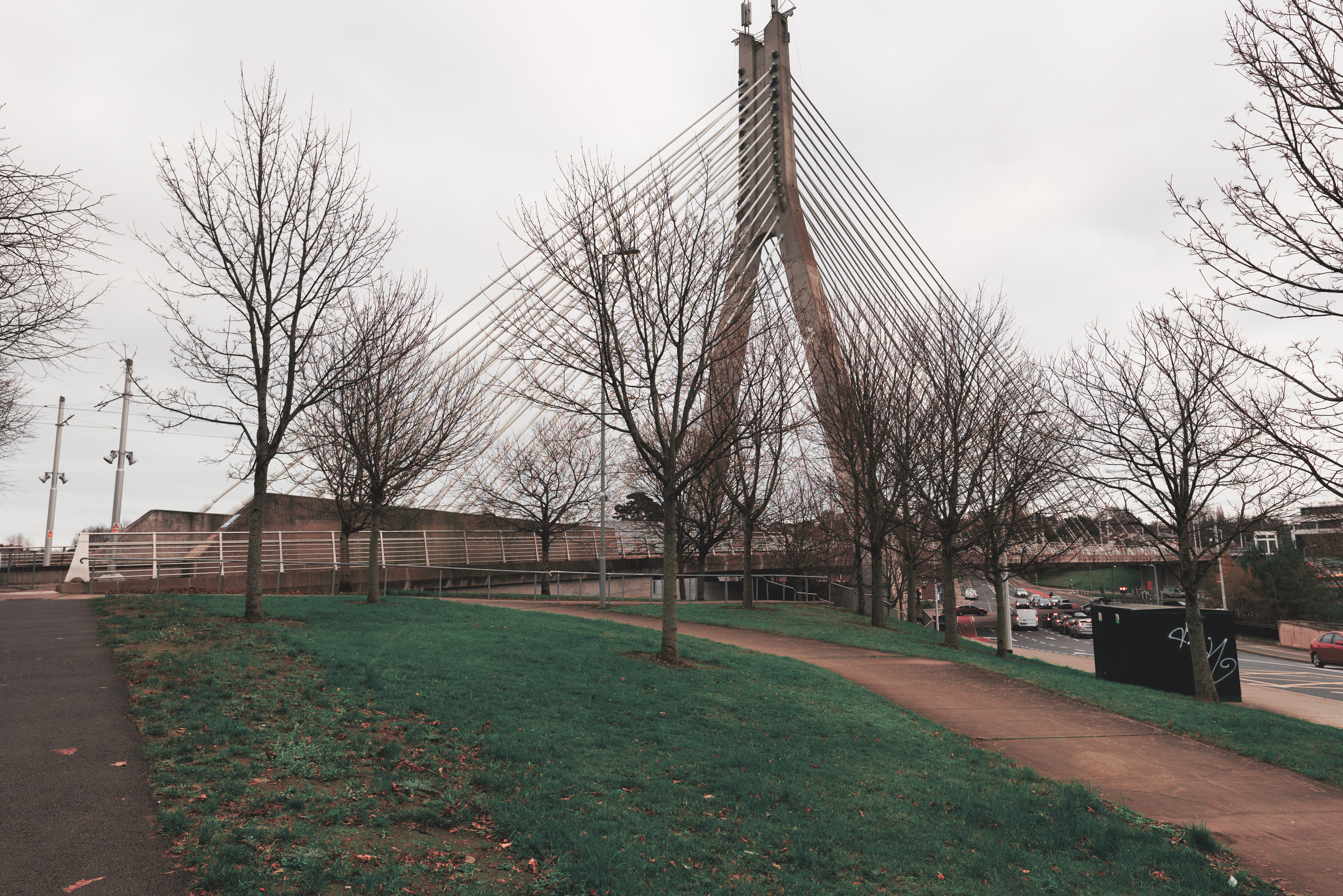
Pedestrian entrance on the northern side of the bridge

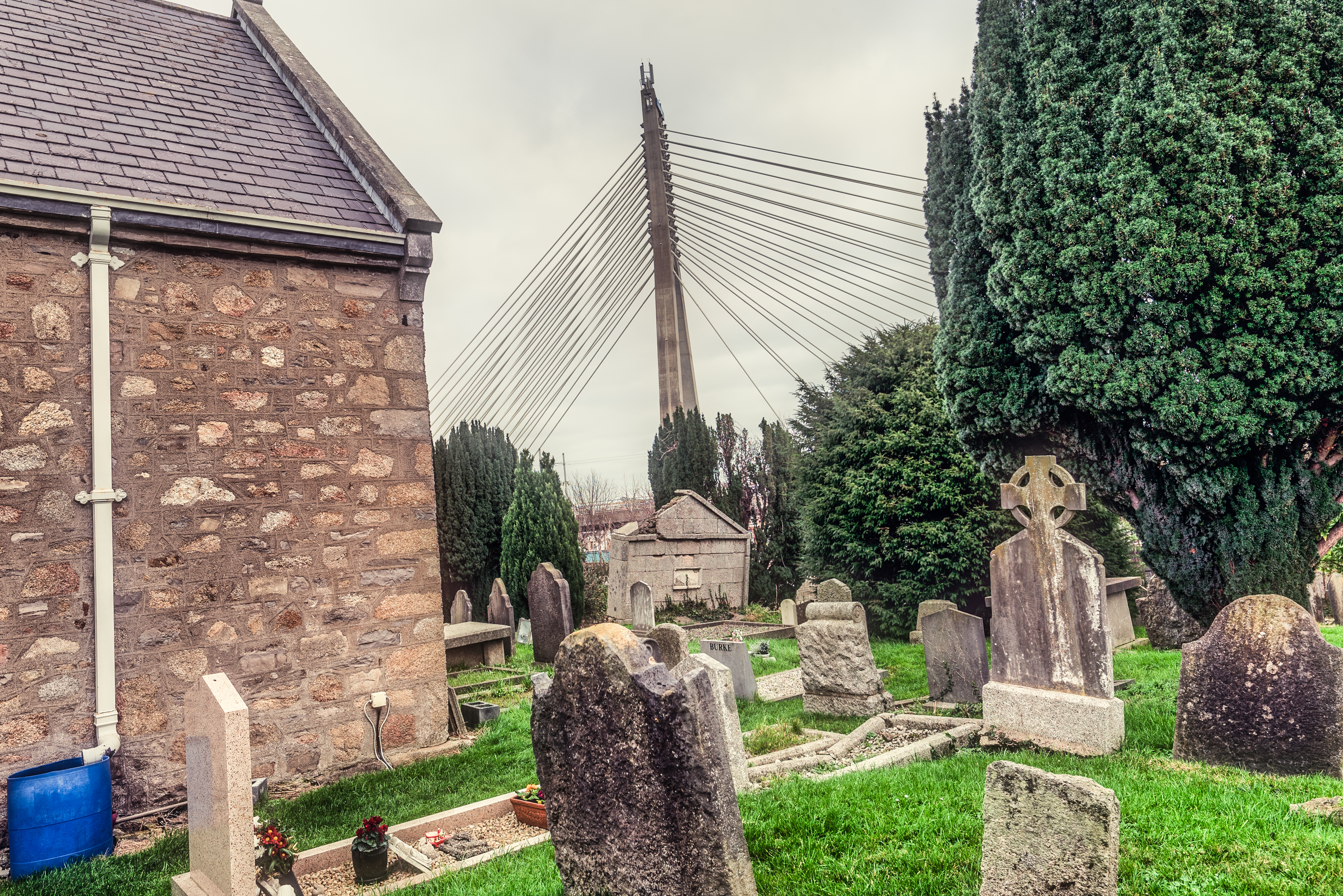
William Dargan Bridge as seen from St Nahi's Church
