= R114 road (Ireland) =

Road between Dublin City and Brittas in Ireland

R114 road
- Bóthar R114
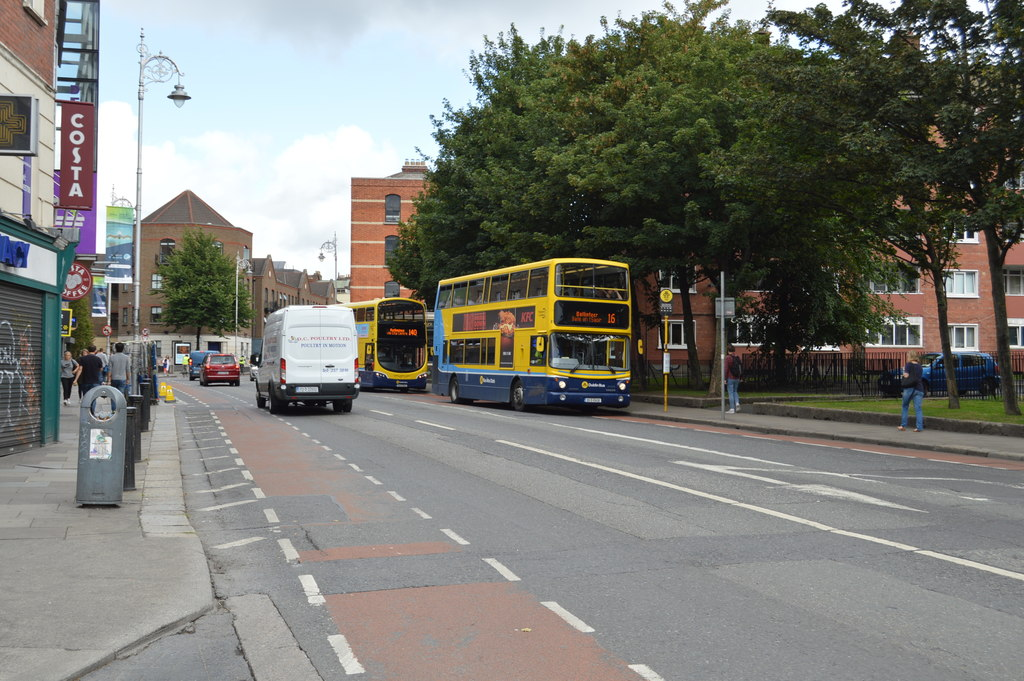
- The R114 (Redmond's Hill) in Dublin city centre

Route information
- Length: 21 km (13 mi)

Location
- Country: Ireland
- Primary destinations: Dublin City; Start of route on George's Street at junction with Dame Street (N81); Wexford Street (R110); Harcourt (R811, R117, Luas Green Line); Portobello (R111); Crosses the Grand Canal at Portobello/La Touche Bridge; Rathmines (R820); Rathgar; Terenure (N81); Crosses the River Dodder at Pearse Bridge; South Dublin; Rathfarnham (R112, R115); Crosses the Owendoher River; Ballyroan (R817); Crosses the M50. No access to Motorway.; Firhouse (R113); Bohernabreena; Crosses the River Dodder at Fort Bridge; Brittas (N81)

Highway system
- Roads in Ireland; Motorways; Primary; Secondary; Regional

The R114 road is a regional road in south Dublin, Ireland. The road runs from the city centre to Brittas in remote southwest County Dublin via Rathmines, Rathgar, Rathfarnham, Knocklyon, Firhouse and the mountainous area of Boharnabreena. The final stretch of the road runs just north of the border between County Dublin and County Wicklow, parallel to the Brittas River and a canal to the River Camac, which rises just to the north.

The official description of the R114 from the Roads Act 1993 (Classification of Regional Roads) Order 2012 reads:

R114: Dublin – Rathfarnham – Brittas, County Dublin

Between its junction with R137 at Dame Street in the city of Dublin and its junction with N81 at Brittas in the county of South Dublin via South Great Georges Street, Aungier Street, Wexford Street, Camden Street Lower, Charlotte Way, Harcourt Street, Harcourt Road, (and via Camden Street Upper), Richmond Street South, Rathmines Road Lower, Rathgar Road, Terenure Road East and Rathfarnham Road in the city of Dublin: Rathfarnham Road, Butterfield Avenue, Old Bridge Road, Firhouse Road, Bohernabreena Road, Ballinascorney Upper and Aghfarrel Road in the county of South Dublin.

The road is 21 kilometres (13 mi) long.

== See also ==
- Roads in Ireland
- National primary road
- National secondary road
- Regional road
