= R838 road (Ireland) =

Road in Ireland

Coordinates: 55.239074°N 7.306413°W

R838 road
- Bóthar R838
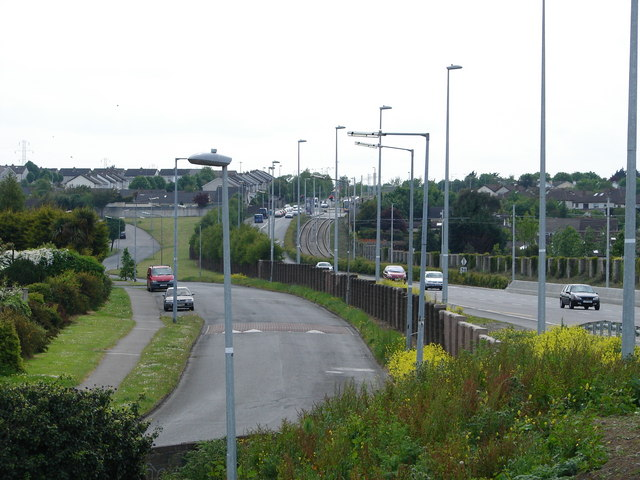
- R838: the Treepark Road and Parkhill Heights

Route information
- Length: 6 km (3.7 mi)

Major junctions
- From: N7 Citywest
- R136 Cheeverstown Road; R113 Belgard Road; M50 Exit 10
- To: Ballymount Road Upper

Location
- Country: Ireland

Highway system
- Roads in Ireland; Motorways; Primary; Secondary; Regional

The R838 road is a regional road in Ireland, located in County Dublin.
