= R134 road (Ireland) =

Road in Ireland

R134 road
- Bóthar R134

Route information
- Length: 7.6 km (4.7 mi)

Location
- Country: Ireland
- Primary destinations: South Dublin; R110 (Naas Road); M50 (no access); R113 (Fonthill Road South); R136 (Outer Ring Road); R120 (Lock Road, Milltown)

Highway system
- Roads in Ireland; Motorways; Primary; Secondary; Regional

The R134 road is a regional road in South Dublin, Ireland connecting the R110 (Naas Road) to the R120 (Lock Road).

The official definition of the R134 from the Roads Act 1993 (Classification of Regional Roads) Order 2012 reads:

R134: Nangor Road, Clondalkin, County Dublin

Between its junction with R110 at Naas Road and its junction with R113 at Fonthill Road South via New Nangor Road all in the county of South Dublin

and

between its junction with R113 at Fonthill Road South and its junction with R120 at Milltown via Nangor Road all in the county of South Dublin.

The road is 7.6 kilometres (4.7 mi) long.

== See also ==
- Roads in Ireland
- National primary road
- National secondary road
- Regional road
