= N7 road (Ireland) =

National primary road in Ireland

N7 road
- Bóthar N7

Route information
- Part of E20
- Length: 186.89 km (116.13 mi)

Location
- Country: Ireland
- Primary destinations: (bypassed routes in italics): County Dublin; Red Cow, Dublin; Rathcoole; County Kildare; Kill; Naas; Sallins; Newbridge; Kildare; Monasterevin; County Laois; Portlaoise; Ballybrittas; Mountrath; Castletown; Borris-in-Ossory; County Tipperary; Roscrea; County Offaly; Dunkerrin; Moneygall; County Tipperary; Toomevara; Nenagh; Birdhill; County Limerick; Daly's Cross; Annacotty; Limerick

Highway system
- Roads in Ireland; Motorways; Primary; Secondary; Regional

The N7 road is a national primary road in Ireland, connecting Limerick and Dublin. The majority of the route (between Naas and Limerick) is motorway standard and is designated as the M7 motorway. At the Rosbrien interchange in Limerick the route continues as the N18 dual carriageway to Galway, Shannon and Ennis. The road passes through the midlands of Ireland, and acts as a trunk route out of Dublin for the N8 and N9 national primary routes to Cork and Waterford respectively. It forms part of European route E20.

== Route ==
=== N7 - Naas Road ===
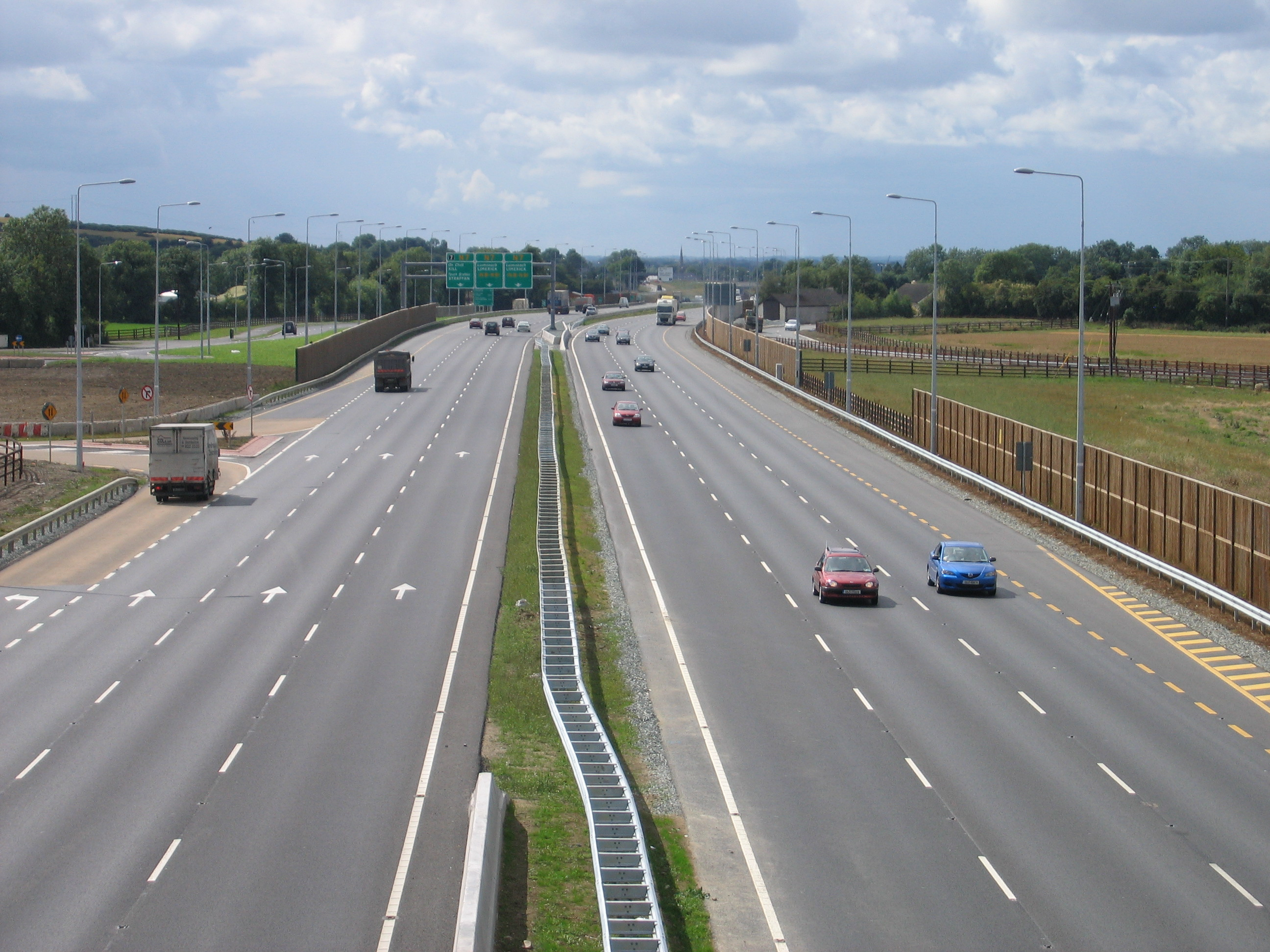
Naas Road section of the N7 after upgrading.

From the M50, the N7 passes south of Clondalkin leaving the city as part of the Naas Road. (The Naas Road begins at the Grand Canal as a regional road (R810), a continuation of the Tyrconnell Road. It continues 3.4 km southwest to the M50 motorway, at the Red Cow interchange, where it becomes the N7.) The N7 route continues in a south-west direction with 3 lanes of traffic each way towards Naas for approximately 15 km (9.3 mi). Construction of the third lane commenced on 4 January 2005 and concluded on 14 August 2006 (thumbnail left); having been originally dualled between 1963 and 1968.

At Newlands Cross a flyover and exit slip roads replaced the at-grade signal-controlled crossing in November 2014. This eliminated the last signal-controlled crossing on the N7/M7 route between the M50 and Limerick. Traffic for Clondalkin to the north and Tallaght to the south leave the N7 by slip roads connecting to the R113. The N7 continues southwards to bypass Citywest, Saggart, Rathcoole, Kill and Johnstown in County Kildare. These locations are all served with grade-separated interchanges which were constructed as part of the upgrade works completed in the mid-2000s. The old junctions consisted of traffic lights with a break in the dual-carriageway median. The three-lane section used to end at junction 9 (Naas, Sallins) with a left-hand lane-drop/lane-gain for traffic leaving/entering here.

The section of the N7 between Naas and the M50 Motorway is the second busiest road in the country with frequent daily tailbacks from the Naas North junction on the southbound side.

This part of the route is the only section that remains designated as N7 as the road is not motorway standard. Left-in/left-out access is provided to minor roads and to homes, farms and businesses along this section.

=== M7 - Naas to Limerick ===
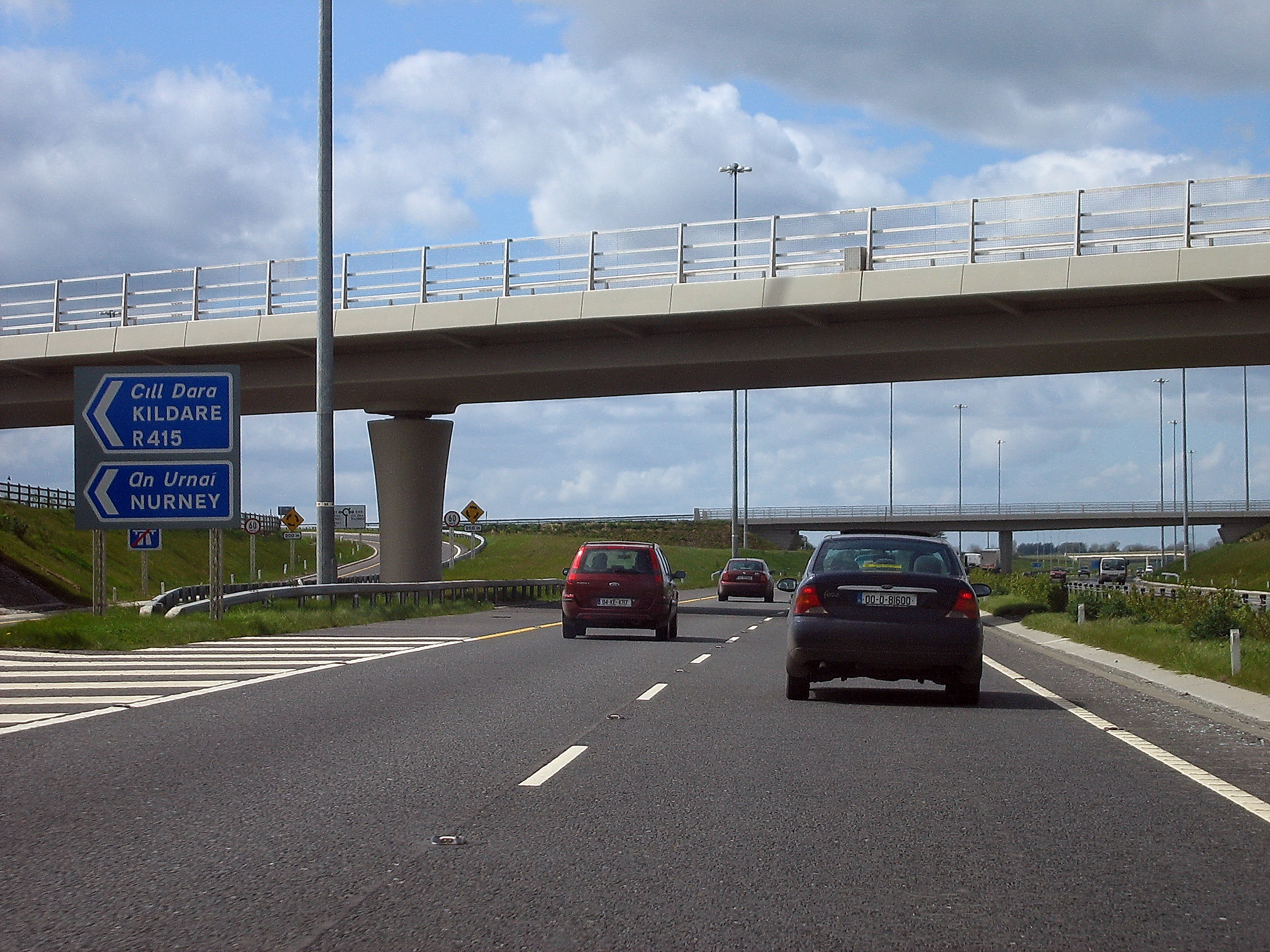
N7 Junction 13 westbound on the M7 near Kildare.

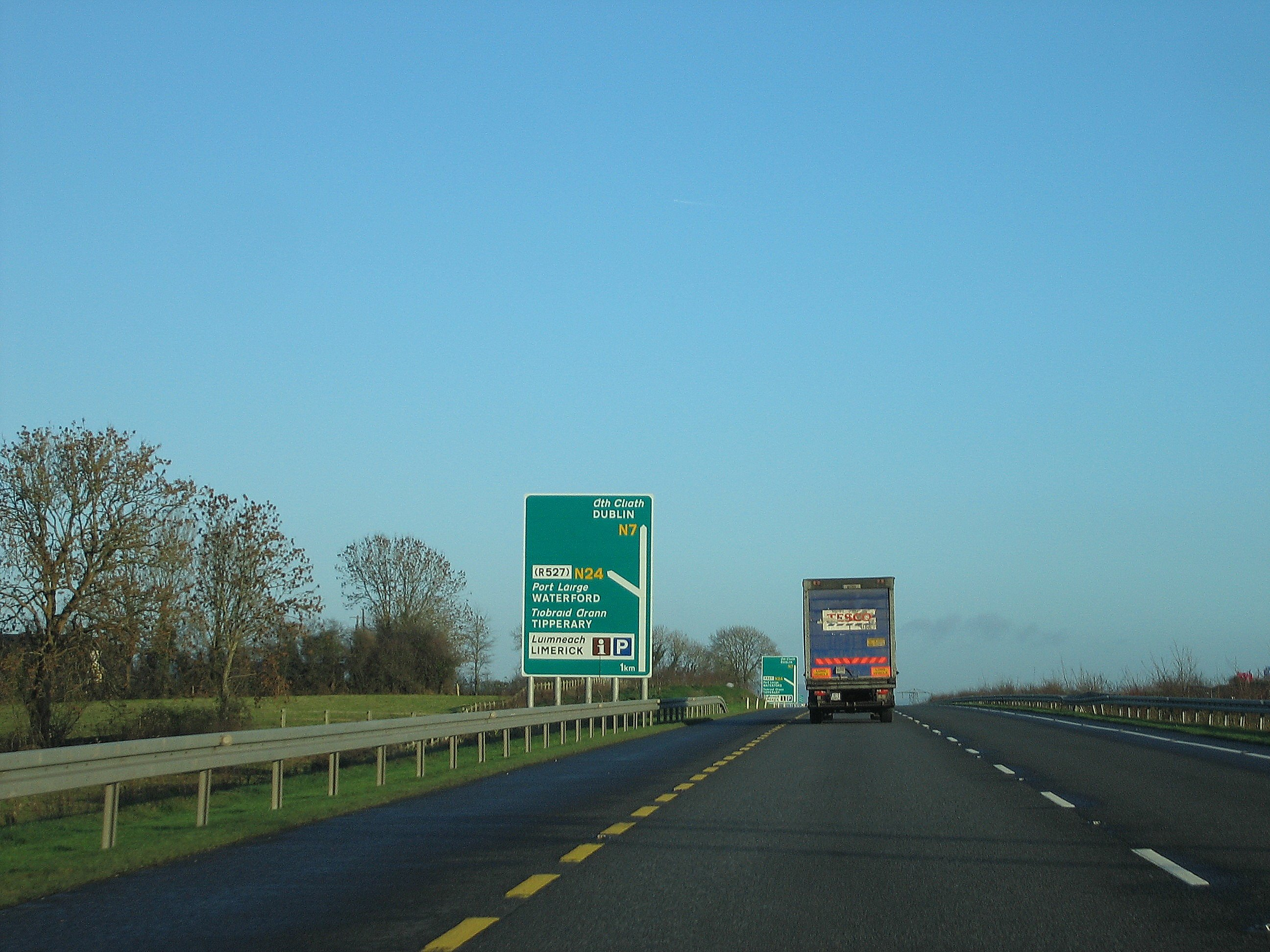
N7 Limerick Southern Ring Phase 1 - J29

From Naas, motorway restrictions are enforced and the route is designated as the M7 motorway. The route continues in a south-west direction bypassing the towns of Naas, Newbridge, Kildare, Monasterevin and Portlaoise. The M9 to Waterford diverges from the route at junction 11. South of Portlaoise the M8 diverges from the M7 to Cork and the south at junction 19 with the M7 continuing south-westwards bypassing the towns of Mountrath, Borris-in-Ossory, Castletown (County Laois), Roscrea, Moneygall, Toomevara, Nenagh and Birdhill. From Birdhill the route continues towards Limerick city where it forms part of the Limerick Southern Ring Road bypassing Annacotty and Castletroy. The route terminates at the Rosbrien Interchange to the south of Limerick City. The road continues as the N18 into county Clare. At the Rosbrien Interchange, access is available to the M20 motorway via a slip road from the M7.

== History ==
Originally the N7 was a single carriage-way route between Dublin and Limerick and passed through the main towns on the route that are now bypassed. The old N7 route was downgraded to regional road status (as soon as sections of the M7 motorway were complete) and is currently designated as the R445 road. The R445 is an alternative route between Limerick and Dublin.

Until 2012, the N7 was the only one of the inter-urban routes out of Dublin which did not commence in Dublin city centre, but rather at the M50. The original N7 route (under the Local Government (Roads and Motorways) Act, 1974 (Declaration of National Roads) Order, 1977) started the route in Dublin city centre, like the other national routes, with the route originally running through Inchicore village before reaching the Naas Road. However, in 1994, following the construction of the Chapelizod bypass which brought the N4 road (now R148) into Dublin city centre as dual carriageway, the N7 inside the M50 was downgraded to regional road status (as the R110 road), with N7 traffic signposted to use the N4 and M50 rather than the original route through Inchicore.

The N7 is noted for two firsts in the history of Irish roads - the first substantial length of dual carriageway in Ireland, running 26 km (16 mi) from Dublin to Naas which was completed in 1968 and also Ireland's first section of motorway, the 8 km (5.0 mi) Naas Bypass, opened in 1983 bypassing the original route through the town.

The old N7 route (now R445/R110) also formed most of the T5 trunk route between Dublin and Limerick. This was an old method of designating routes in Ireland before the current method was introduced.

=== History of upgrades to the N7 and M7 ===
Towards the start of the 21st Century, a substantial effort was made to upgrade all sections of the N7 road to motorway standard, creating a high-quality standard connection between Dublin and Limerick. Prior to the year 2000, only short sections of the N7 were of motorway or dual-carriageway status:

- Widening of the N7 between Dublin and Naas to dual carriageway status - 1960s (the third lane constructed each way completed in 2006)
- M7 Naas Bypass - completed 1983
- M7 Newbridge Bypass - completed 1993
- M7 Portlaoise Bypass - completed 1997

As part of the National Development Plan undertaken by the Irish Government from the mid-2000s onwards; work took place to link existing sections of the M7 and extend it to Limerick:

- M7 Kildare Bypass - completed 2003
- M7 Monasterevin Bypass and Limerick Bypass - completed in 2004
- M7 Nenagh to Limerick, Portlaoise to Castletown and Castletown to Nenagh - all completed in 2010.

== Map of route ==
- Route of N7 overlaid on Google Maps

== Junctions ==
The junctions on the Naas Bypass and Newbridge Bypass sections of the M7 were previously numbered J7-J11 (now renumbered Junctions 9–13), in the expectation that an M7 motorway would be built along a new alignment. Instead, the Naas Road dual-carriageway was upgraded. There remain some private accesses and minor exits prior to J9, the beginning of the M7 motorway.

Junctions 9-30 form part of the motorway section of the N7.

County	km	mi	Junction	Destinations	Notes
County Dublin
County Dublin	0	0	1 Red Cow interchange	M50 – Dublin Airport, Dublin Port, Dún Laoghaire	Continues as R110 towards city centre.
County Dublin	0.5	0.3		L1019 – Clondalkin	Red Cow Luas Park and Ride; LILO junction. Westbound entrance and exit only.
County Dublin	2	1.2	1a	R113 ‒ Tallaght, Clondalkin	
County Dublin	2.5	1.6		L1003 – Boot Road	Eastbound exit only.
County Dublin	4	2.5	2	R136 – Grange Castle, Kingswood	Cheeverstown Luas Park and Ride
County Dublin	5.5	3.4	3	L2011 – Blessington, Citywest	LILO junction. Partially signposted as defunct N82 road.
County Dublin	6	3.7	3a	L2002 – Saggart, Citywest	LILO junction. Westbound entrance and exit only.
County Dublin	6	3.7		L2006 – Baldonnel	Casement Aerodrome; LILO junction. Eastbound entrance and exit only.
County Dublin	7.5	4.7	4	R120 – Saggart, Rathcoole, Newcastle	
County Dublin	9	5.6		L2004 – Rathcoole	LILO junction. Westbound entrance and exit only.
County Dublin	9.5	5.9		L6062 – Tootenhill	LILO junction. Westbound entrance and exit only.
County Dublin	10.5	6.5		L6012 – Colmanstown Lane	LILO junction. Eastbound entrance and exit only.
County Dublin	12	7.5	5	L6010 – Castlewarden L6001 – Athgoe L6020 – Steelstown	LILO junction.
County Kildare
County Kildare	14.5	9	6	Castlewarden, Kilteel	LILO junction.
County Kildare	16.5	10.2	7	L2014 – Kill (North) L2007 – Straffan	
County Kildare	19	11.8	8	L2014 – Johnstown, Kill (westbound); Kill (South) (eastbound)	
County Kildare	21	13	9	R445 – Naas (North) (westbound)	Continues as M7 motorway.
1.000 mi = 1.609 km; 1.000 km = 0.621 mi: Incomplete access; Tolled; Route transition

== See also ==
- Roads in Ireland
- Motorways in Ireland
- National secondary road
- Regional road
