= R810 road (Ireland) =

Road in Ireland

R810 road
- Bóthar R810
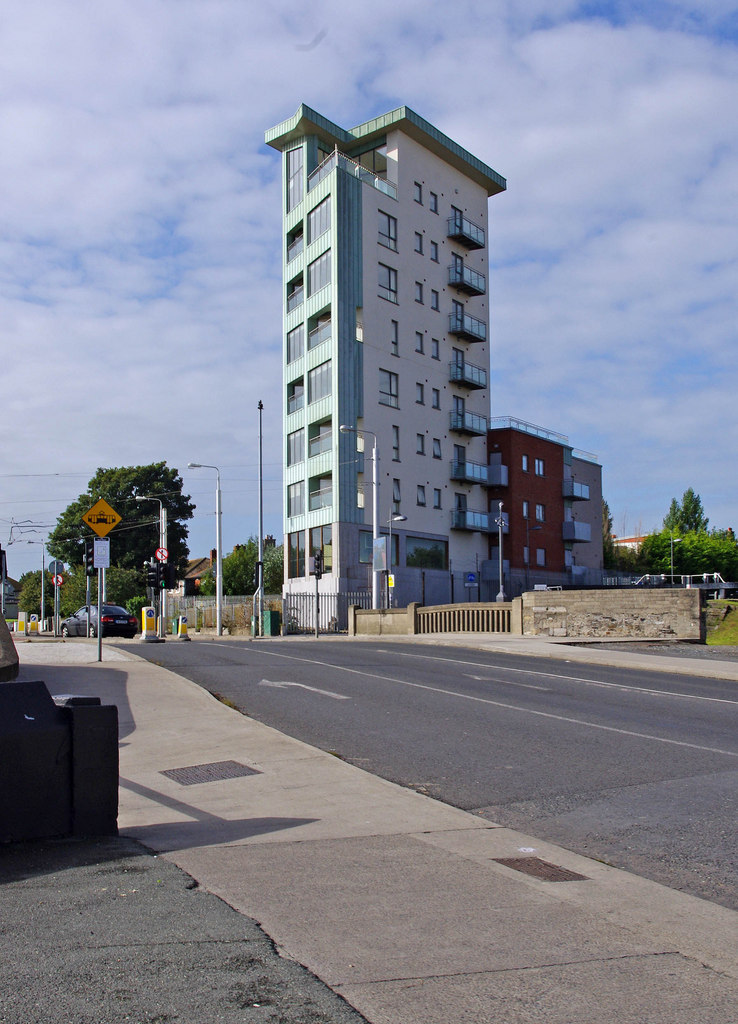
- Tyrconnell Road, Inchicore, on the R810

Route information
- Length: 7.3 km (4.5 mi)

Location
- Country: Ireland
- Primary destinations: Dublin City; Begins at the junction with Bridge Street; St. James's Hospital; South Circular Road (R111); Turns southwest (left); becomes Tyrconnell Road; County Dublin; Crosses Grand Canal at Blackhorse Bridge (becomes Naas Road); Kylemore Road / Walkinstown Avenue (R112); Long Mile Road (R110) / Nangor Road (R134); M50 motorway

Highway system
- Roads in Ireland; Motorways; Primary; Secondary; Regional

The R810 road is a regional road in south Dublin, Ireland connecting Cornmarket to the Naas Road (N7).

It begins near the Coombe and goes west until it becomes Tyrconnell Road, when it turns southwest. Shortly afterwards, when it crosses the Grand Canal, it becomes the Naas Road and continues southwest to the M50 motorway, at the Red Cow interchange, where it becomes the N7.

The official definition of the R810 from the Roads Act 1993 (Classification of Regional Roads) Order 2006 states:

R810: Cornmarket – Inchicore, Dublin

Between its junction with R108 at Bridge Street in the city of Dublin and its junction with R110 at Long Mile Road in the county of South Dublin via Cornmarket, Thomas Street West, James's Street, Mount Brown, Old Kilmainham, Emmett Road, Tyrconnell Road and Naas Road in the city of Dublin; and Naas Road in the county of South Dublin.

The road is 7.3 kilometres (4.5 mi) long.

== See also ==
- Roads in Ireland
- National primary road
- Regional road
