= Mespil =

Mespil can refer to:

- Mespil road in Dublin City, Ireland, part of the R111 road
- The tree Manilkara zapota, also called Sapodilla
- The Snowy Mespil tree, Amelanchier lamarckii
- Mispil

== See also ==
- Mespilus, a genus of trees
