= N82 =

N82 may refer to:

- Burarra language
- HMS Umpire (N82), a submarine of the Royal Navy
- N82 road, in Ireland
- Nokia N82, a smartphone
- Wurtsboro–Sullivan County Airport, in Sullivan County, New York, United States
