= Red Cow interchange =

- Interactive map of Red Cow interchange

Location
- Dublin, Ireland
- Coordinates: 53°19′06.1″N 6°22′05.6″W
- Roads at junction: M50; N7

Construction
- Type: Interchange
- Opened: 1990
- Reconstructed: 2008-2010

The Red Cow interchange is a major road junction in west Dublin, Ireland on the M50, meeting the N7 Naas Road (to Cork and Limerick) at a free-flow grade-separated junction which incorporates a tram line. The N7 route commences at this junction, junction 1 on the N7 and junction 9 on the M50, and the Naas Road from the city centre via Inchicore to the Red Cow interchange comprises part of the R110 and the R810. The junction is the busiest road junction in Ireland. In its original configuration, with traffic signals governing many movements, it frequently had tailbacks several kilometres long on the routes leading to it. Geographically, the Red Cow interchange is situated within the administrative area of South Dublin County Council, located just west of the border with the Dublin City Council administrative area.

== Original configuration ==
Opened in 1990 as part of the M50 Western Parkway project, the junction was originally a grade-separated interchange from the point of view of M50 travellers; however, for N7 motorists it was a signal-controlled roundabout with negotiation of traffic lights required for all movements. From 1994 onwards the roundabout became the terminus of the N7 road following the decision to detrunk the road inside the M50 (becoming the R110 road).

The nickname Mad Cow roundabout was commonly used to refer to the junction, referring to the slang term given to cattle suffering from the brain disease BSE. The actual name of the roundabout referred to the "Red Cow Inn", a landmark pub formerly in the vicinity. The Red Cow Moran hotel stands adjacent to the interchange today.

== Upgrade ==
The junction was upgraded as part of works on the M50 motorway. Congestion was alleviated by providing a third level of grade-separation, allowing Dublin–Cork/Limerick traffic to travel from the M50 to the N7 without having to navigate a roundabout. The junction upgrade was substantially complete by December 2008, with only minor finishing works outstanding. A similar upgrade of the N4/M50 interchange was completed on 20 December 2007. .

The junction is now a rather tight spaghetti-style interchange, a variant of the partially-unrolled cloverleaf design. Following the creation of a grade-separated junction at Newlands Cross in November 2014, the last signal-controlled crossing on the N7/M7 route between the Red Cow interchange and Limerick was eliminated.

== Luas stop and depot ==
Red Cow An Bhó Dhearg
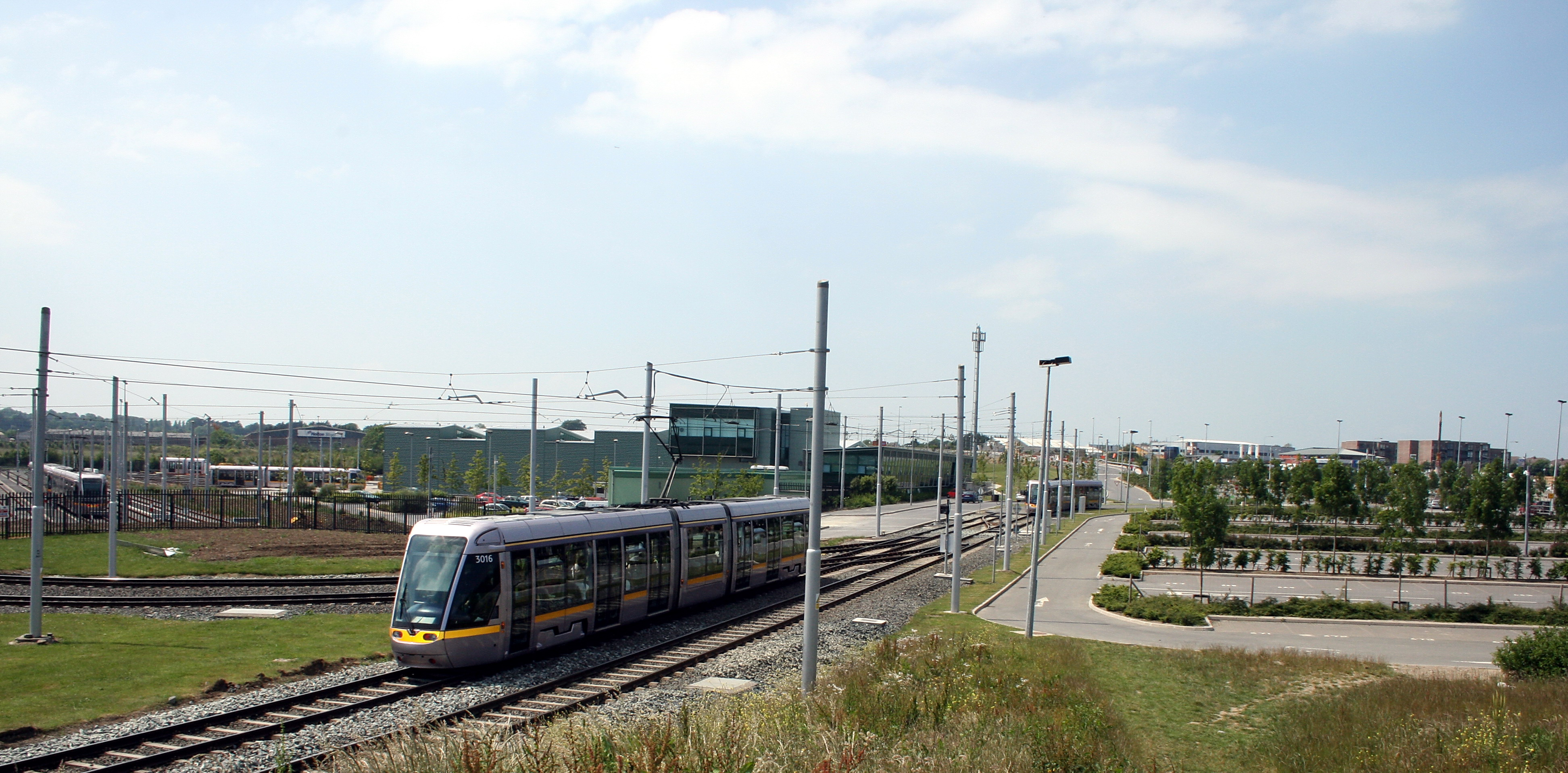
- Luas Red Cow depot and Park and Ride

General information
- Location: Dublin; Ireland
- Owner: Transport Infrastructure Ireland
- Operator: Luas
- Line: Red
- Platforms: 2
- Bus operators: Dublin Bus; Dublin Coach; JJ Kavanagh and Sons
- Connections: 13; 60; 68; 69; 300; 600; 717; 726; 735; 736; 750; G1; GD02; L54

Construction
- Structure type: At-grade

Other information
- Fare zone: Red 3/Red 4

Key dates
- 26 September 2004: Station opened

Services
Preceding station	Luas	Following station
Kingswood towards Saggart or Tallaght	Red Line	Kylemore towards The Point or Connolly
Location

The tram depot for the Luas Red Line, a halt (Red Cow) and a Park and Ride are located at the interchange. The interchange includes a Luas tram stop (Red Cow), the main depot for the Red Line, a Park and Ride facility with 727 spaces, and the control centre for the whole system. The Luas complex added extra traffic to the already-busy junction when it opened in 2004. The tram line crossed the slip roads on the southern side of the junction, as well as crossing half of the road from the city centre before it met the junction (the tram line reaches this point by following the median of the road). When leaving the stop, southbound trams run alongside the motorway until the next junction. The issue of the traffic disruption added by the tram system was seemingly ignored during the original planning of the Luas system. After an outcry over this, government ministers were involved in discussions about the system passing over the junction on "stilts", while the actual construction of the system was underway.

The new interchange keeps trams separated from all other traffic.

== See also ==
- Palmerstown which lists Red Cow as a townland of the civil parish
- Roads in Ireland
- N25: Kinsale Road Roundabout on the Cork southern ring road is another notable junction in Ireland.
