= R812 road (Ireland) =

Road in Ireland

R812 road
- Bóthar R812

Route information
- Length: 1.5 km (0.93 mi)

Location
- Country: Ireland
- Primary destinations: Dublin; R810 (Tyrconnell Road); Davitt Road; R111 at (Dolphin Road)

Highway system
- Roads in Ireland; Motorways; Primary; Secondary; Regional

The R812 road, or Davitt Road, is a regional road in Dublin, Ireland.

The official definition of the R812 from the Roads Act 1993 (Classification of Regional Roads) Order 2006 states:

R812: Davitt Road, Dublin

Between its junction with R810 at Tyrconnell Road and its junction with R111 at Dolphin Road via Davitt Road all in the city of Dublin.

The R812 is 1.5 kilometres (0.93 mi).

== See also ==
- Roads in Ireland
- National primary road
- National secondary road
- Regional road
