= R111 road (Ireland) =

Road in Ireland

R111 road
- Bóthar R111
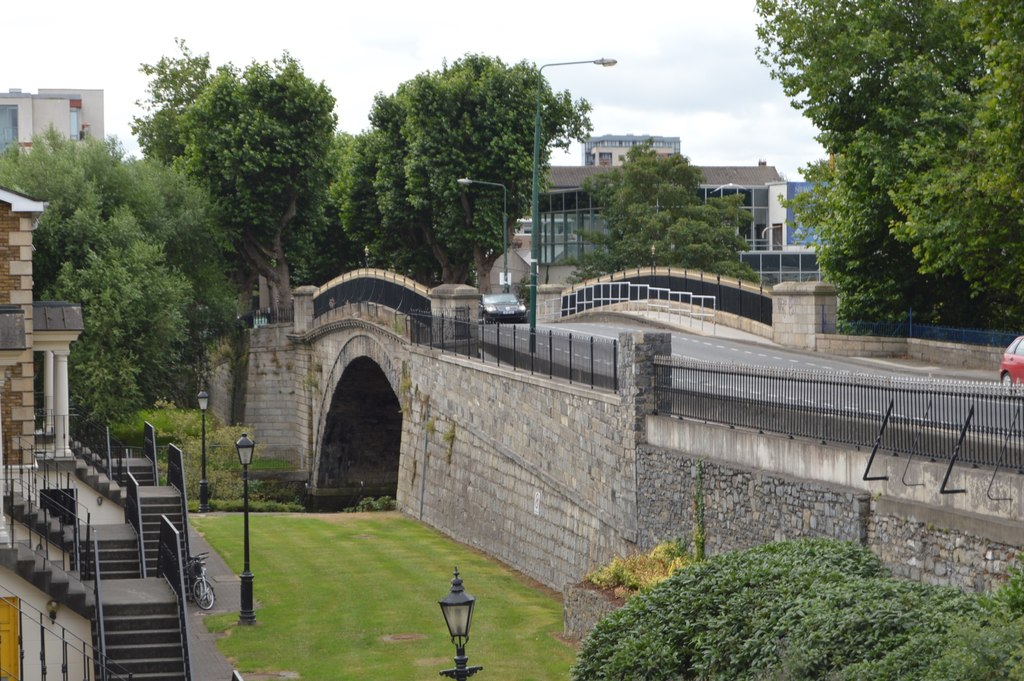
- The R111 crosses Islandbridge (formerly Sarah's Bridge) near Phoenix Park

Location
- Country: Ireland
- Primary destinations: Dublin City; Islandbridge (R109); Crosses the River Liffey; Kilmainham (North) (R839, R148); Crosses the River Camac; Kilmainham (R811, R810); Suir Road (R812, Luas Red Line); Crosses the Grand Canal at Suir Road Bridge; Dolphin's Barn (R110); Harold's Cross (R137); Portobello (R114); Charlemont (R117, Luas Green Line); Leeson Street (R138); Baggot Street (R816); Beggars Bush (R815, R118); Crosses the DART line; Crosses the River Dodder at London Bridge; Irishtown (R802, R131)

Highway system
- Roads in Ireland; Motorways; Primary; Secondary; Regional

The R111 road is a regional road in south Dublin, Ireland, and includes a major element of the Dublin Outer Orbital Route.

The official description of the R111 from the Roads Act 1993 (Classification of Regional Roads) Order 2012 reads:

R111: Conyngham Road – Beach Road, Sandymount, Dublin

Between its junction with R109 at Conyngham Road and its junction with R131 at Beach Road Sandymount via South Circular Road, Suir Road, Dolphin Road, Parnell Road, Grove Road, Canal Road, Grand Parade, Mespil Road, Haddington Road, Bath Avenue, Londonbridge Road and Church Avenue all in the city of Dublin.

== Dublin Outer Orbital Route ==
Along with the R131 the route makes up the southern section of the outer ring of the Dublin Outer Orbital Route (DOOR). This route was designed by Dublin City Council to take traffic away from the city centre. The following junctions are present on the route:

- 64 Conygham Road/Chapelizod Road junction with the South Circular Road (R111).
- 63 Junction with N4.
- 61 Junction with Emmet Road/Old Kilmainham Road (R810) with South Circular Road (R111).
- 60 Junction of Suir Road (R111) and South Circular Road (R811).
- 59 Suir Road/Dolphin Road junction with Davitt Road (R812).
- 58 Junction with Dolphin Road/Parnell Road (R111) and Dolphin's Barn Street/Crumlin Road (R110).
- 57 Junction with Parnell Road/Grove Road and Clanbrassil Street Upper/Harold's Cross Road (N81).
- 56 Portobello junction of Grove Road/Canal Road (R111) and Richmond Street South and Rathmines Road Lower (R114).
- 55 Junction of Canal Road/Grand Parade and Charlemont Street/Ranelagh Road (R117).
- 54 Grand Parade/Mespil Road junction with Leeson Street Upper and Lower (N11).
- 53 Mespil Road/Haddington Road junction with Baggot Upper and Lower (R816).
- 52 Haddington Road (R111) and Northumberland Road (R118) junction.
- 51 Junction of Haddington Road/Bath Avenue and Grand Canal Street Upper and Shelbourne Road (R815). There is also a local road at this junction.
- 81 Church Avenue (R111) junction with Beach Road/Bath Street/Pembroke Street (R802) and Sean Moore Road (R131).

There are a total of 81 junctions on the two orbital routes.

== See also ==
- National primary road
- National secondary road
- Regional road
- Roads in Ireland
