= London Bridge (Dublin) =

Bridge over the River Dodder in Ireland

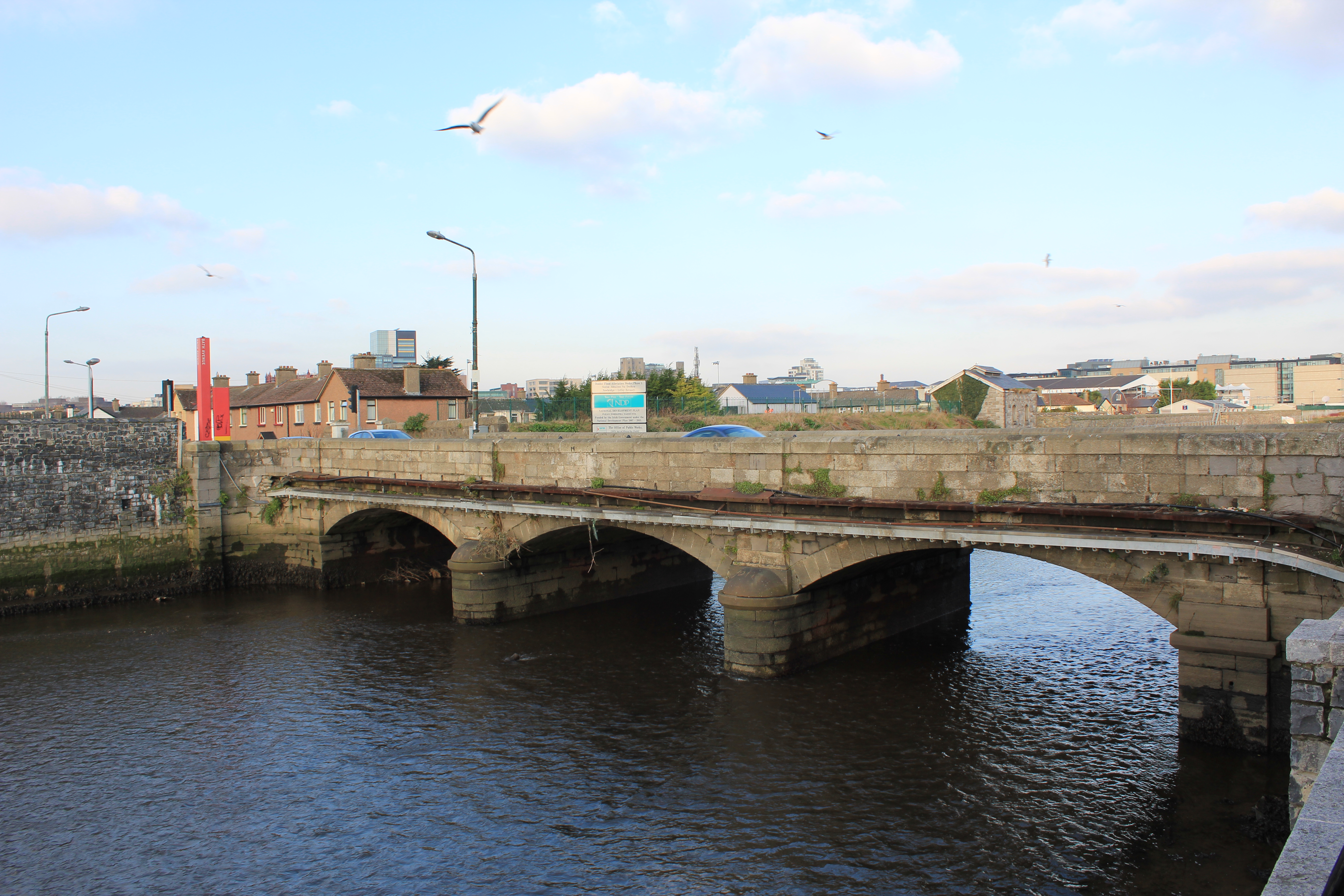
- London Bridge from the eastern bank of the Dodder looking downstream
- Coordinates: 53.337689°N 6.226583°W
- Crosses: River Dodder
- Locale: Dublin, Ireland
- Maintained by: Dublin City Council
- Preceded by: Unknown when first bridge was built but a bridge is shown on an 1837 map of Dublin

Characteristics
- Material: Stone
- No. of spans: 3

History
- Opened: 1857

The London Bridge (Irish: Droichead Londan) is a bridge over the River Dodder in Dublin, Ireland. The current bridge was opened in 1857 with an unknown engineer designing the structure. A previous bridge was built at some point between 1798 and 1837 based on historical maps of Dublin.

The bridge connects Bath Avenue to Londonbridge Road (Irish: Bóthar Dhroichead Londan) on the R111 road. Traffic across the bridge is limited to one lane by traffic lights at each end.
