= R821 road (Ireland) =

Road in Ireland

R821 road
- Bóthar R821

Route information
- Length: 2.1 km (1.3 mi)

Location
- Country: Ireland
- Primary destinations: South Dublin; Rathfarnham (R115); Grange Road (R822); Dún Laoghaire–Rathdown; Nutgrove; Churchtown (R112)

Highway system
- Roads in Ireland; Motorways; Primary; Secondary; Regional

The R821 road is a regional road in south Dublin, Ireland. The road starts at the junction with the R115 (Willbrook Road) in Rathfarnham and passes through Nutgrove before terminating at Churchtown.

== Route ==
- The road starts at the T-junction with the R115 (Willbrook Road) beside the well known The Yellow House pub. The road heads in an easterly direction and is known as Grange Road.
- About 350 metres further the Grange Road turns off in a southerly direction as the R822 while the R821 continues easterly as Nutgrove Avenue.
- The route passes the shopping center and retail park in Nutgrove after a crossroad with local roads.
- The route terminates at a triangle in Churchtown where it connects with the R112 (Upper Churchtown Road) and a local road (Beaumont Avenue).

== Transport ==
A westbound bus lane is present along the entire route while after Nutgrove there is also a bus lane heading east until the end of the route in Churchtown. There are a number of Dublin Bus routes along the R821:

- 16
- 16D
- S6
- 161

There is an off street bike lane on the route though there are a few sections where the lane ends unexpectedly.

== Future plans ==
Currently there are plans to upgrade the junction with the R112 and Beaumont Avenue.

== See also ==
- Roads in Ireland
- National primary road
- National secondary road
