= R822 road (Ireland) =

Road in Ireland

R822 road
- Bóthar R822

Route information
- Length: 1.5 km (0.93 mi)

Location
- Country: Ireland
- Primary destinations: South Dublin; Rathfarnham (R821); Ballyboden (R113)

Highway system
- Roads in Ireland; Motorways; Primary; Secondary; Regional

The R822 road is a regional road in south Dublin, Ireland. The road starts at the junction with the R821 (Nutgrove Avenue) in Rathfarnham before terminating with the junction with Taylor's Lane on the R113. The road is known as Grange Road throughout.

== Transport ==
There road is serviced by the following Dublin Bus routes:

- 16
- 16A

== Points of interest ==
- Saint Enda's
- Loreto Abbey

== See also ==
- Roads in Ireland
- National primary road
- National secondary road
