= Kinnegad =

Town in County Westmeath, Ireland

Kinnegad Irish: Cionn Átha Gad
- Town
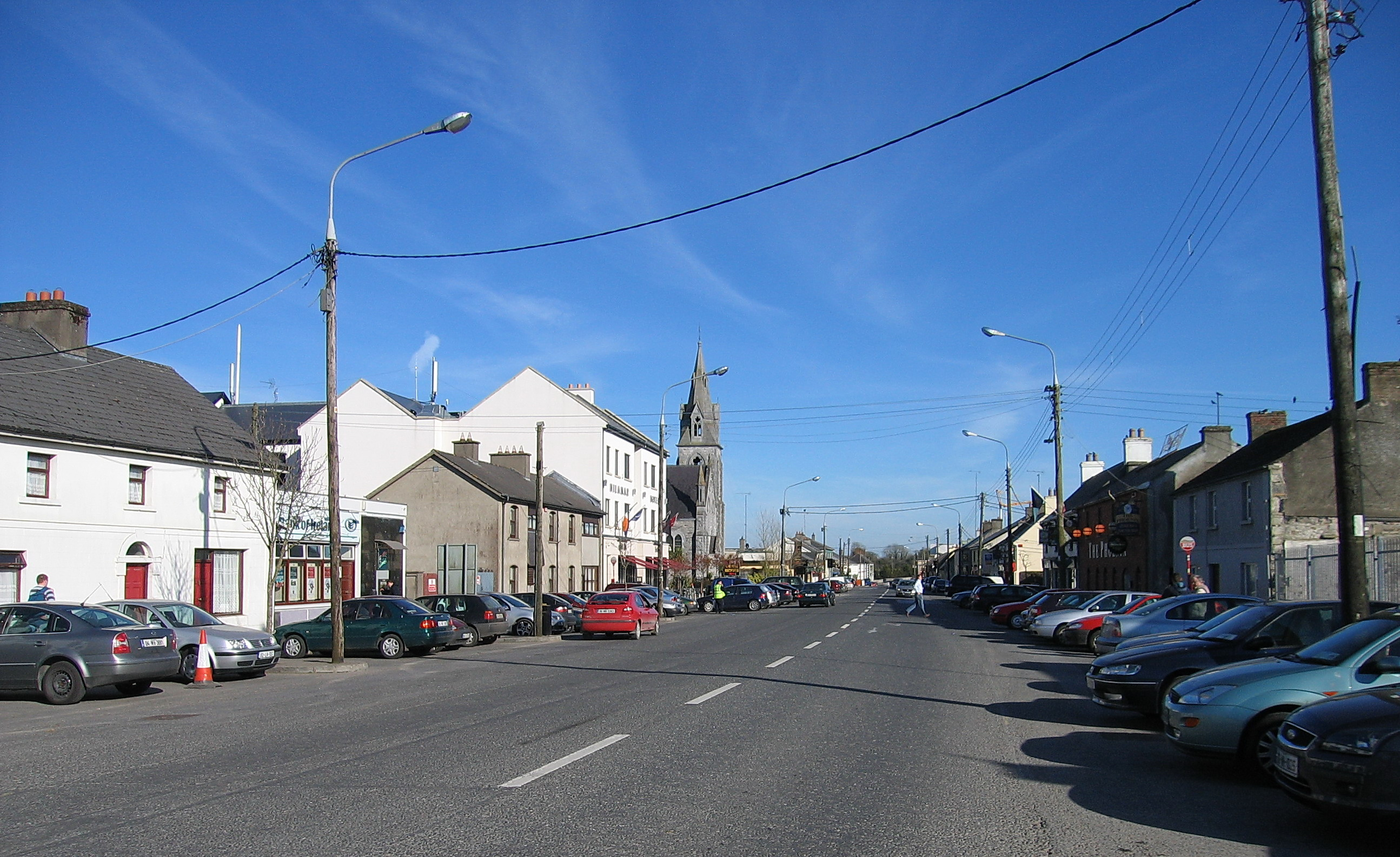
- Kinnegad Main Street, the former N4

- Location in Ireland
- Coordinates: 53.455°N 7.101°W
- Country: Ireland
- Province: Leinster
- County: County Westmeath
- Elevation: 76 m (249 ft)

Population (2022)
  - Total: 3,064
- Irish Grid Reference: N595453

Kinnegad (Irish: Cionn Átha Gad, meaning 'head of the ford of withes') is a town in County Westmeath, Ireland. It is on the border with County Meath, near the junction of the M6 and the M4 motorways - two of Ireland's main east–west roads. It is roughly 60 km from the capital, Dublin.

From 1996 to 2016, there was a considerable increase in Kinnegad's population, from 517 to 2,745 inhabitants. According to the 2016 census, approximately 79% of the town's housing stock (715 out of 907 households) was built between 1991 and 2010.

== Transport ==
Kinnegad is primarily a commuter town, serving Dublin via the N4 and the M4 motorway. Citylink and Bus Éireann both serve Kinnegad towards Dublin, in addition to private company Kearns. There is no railway station in the town; it was served by the station at Hill of Down (which was originally called Kinnegad when it opened in 1847) until its closure in 1947. As of 2019, there were calls for the reopening of the train station at Killucan, to serve both Killucan and Rathwire and Kinnegad, but this is unlikely before extra capacity is available on the Dublin-Sligo railway line.

== Education ==
The town has a large national school, Saint Etchen's Kinnegad N.S. The school consists of two separate buildings, Scoil Etchen Naofa (built-in 1984) and the Cardinal Glennon building (built-in 2008). The renovation was necessary due to an increase in population. It is run by the Catholic Church but non-Catholic children can attend the school.

There was a campaign by the Kinnegad Steering Group during the 2010s in favour of the development of a secondary school in the town, but as of 2019 this had yet to materialise.

== Religious sites ==
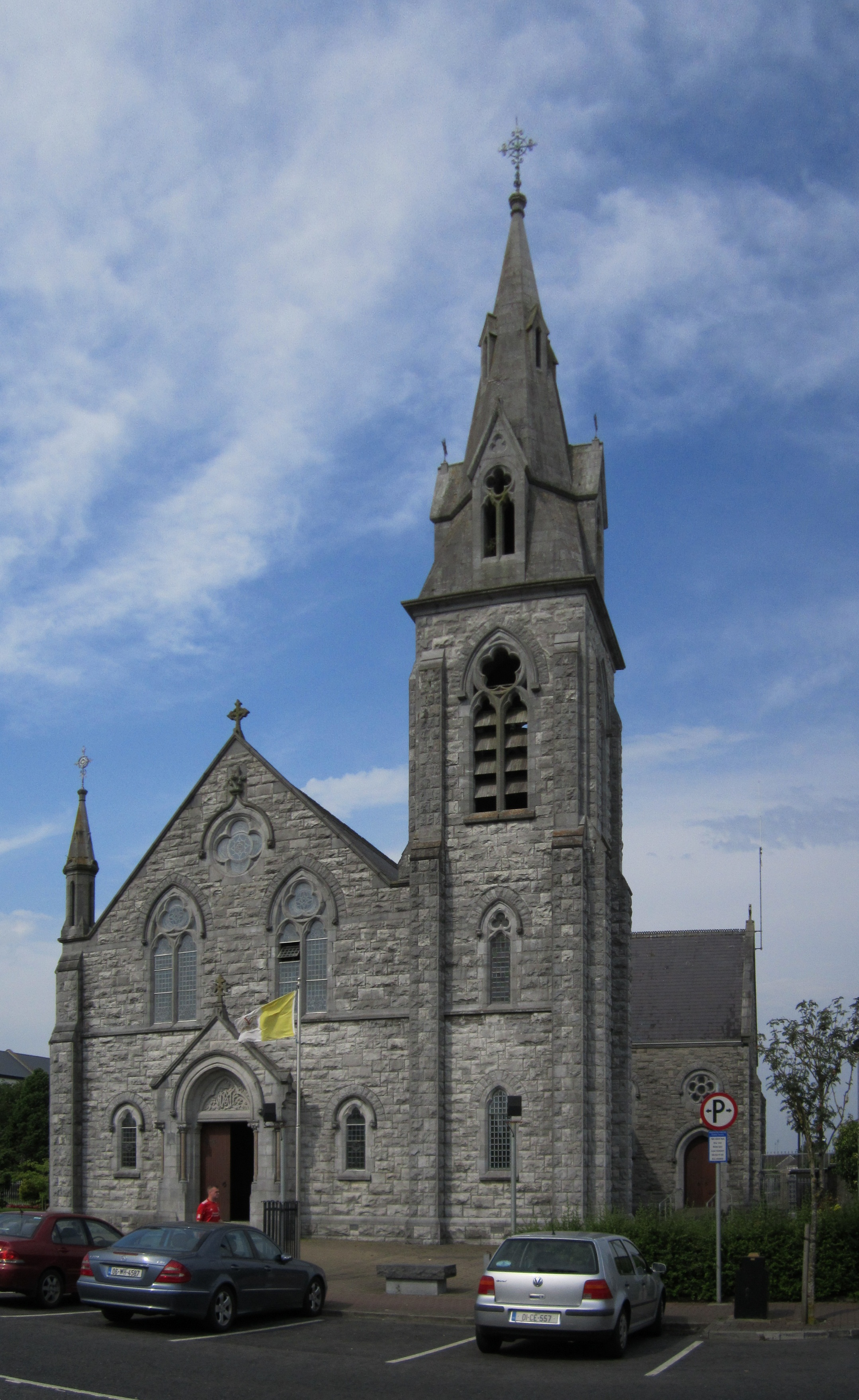
St. Mary's Church of the Assumption, Kinnegad

The Catholic church of St. Mary's Church of the Assumption is in Kinnegad. It is part of the Roman Catholic Diocese of Meath. The then arch-bishop, Seán Brady, visited the church on 7 June 2009, in honour of its 100-year anniversary. There are bullet holes visible in the stations of the cross in the church which were made by the Black and Tans in the 1920s.

== Sport ==
The local Gaelic football team is Coralstown/Kinnegad Gaelic Football Club, which fields teams for both male and female players aged from under eight through to senior level. The club's colours are red shirts and socks, and white shorts. The club has three pitches and a clubhouse with four dressing rooms, toilets, and a gym.

The town also has an association football club, Kinnegad Juniors Athletic Football Club, which was founded in 2005. Kinnegad Juniors play at Lagan Park (now known as Breedon Park) on the Killucan Road, Kinnegad. The club caters to boys and girls from the ages of 6–19 and also has a senior men's and women's team.

== See also ==
- List of towns and villages in Ireland
- Kinnegad River
