= Coralstown =

Coralstown Baile Mhic Cearúill
- Village
- Location in Ireland
- Coordinates: 53°28′52″N 7°09′36″W
- Country: Ireland
- Province: Leinster
- County: County Westmeath
- Time zone: UTC+0 (WET)
  - Summer (DST): UTC-1 (IST (WEST))
- Irish Grid Reference: N503438

Coralstown (Irish: Baile Mhic Cearúill), also Correllstown, is a village in County Westmeath, Ireland. It is located in the south of the county on the N4 road, to the north of Kinnegad.

The village contains a National school, a post office, and a church dedicated to St Agnes.

== See also ==
- List of towns and villages in Ireland
