= Daly's Cross =

Small settlement in County Limerick, Ireland

Daly's Cross Crosaire Uí Dhalaigh
- Village
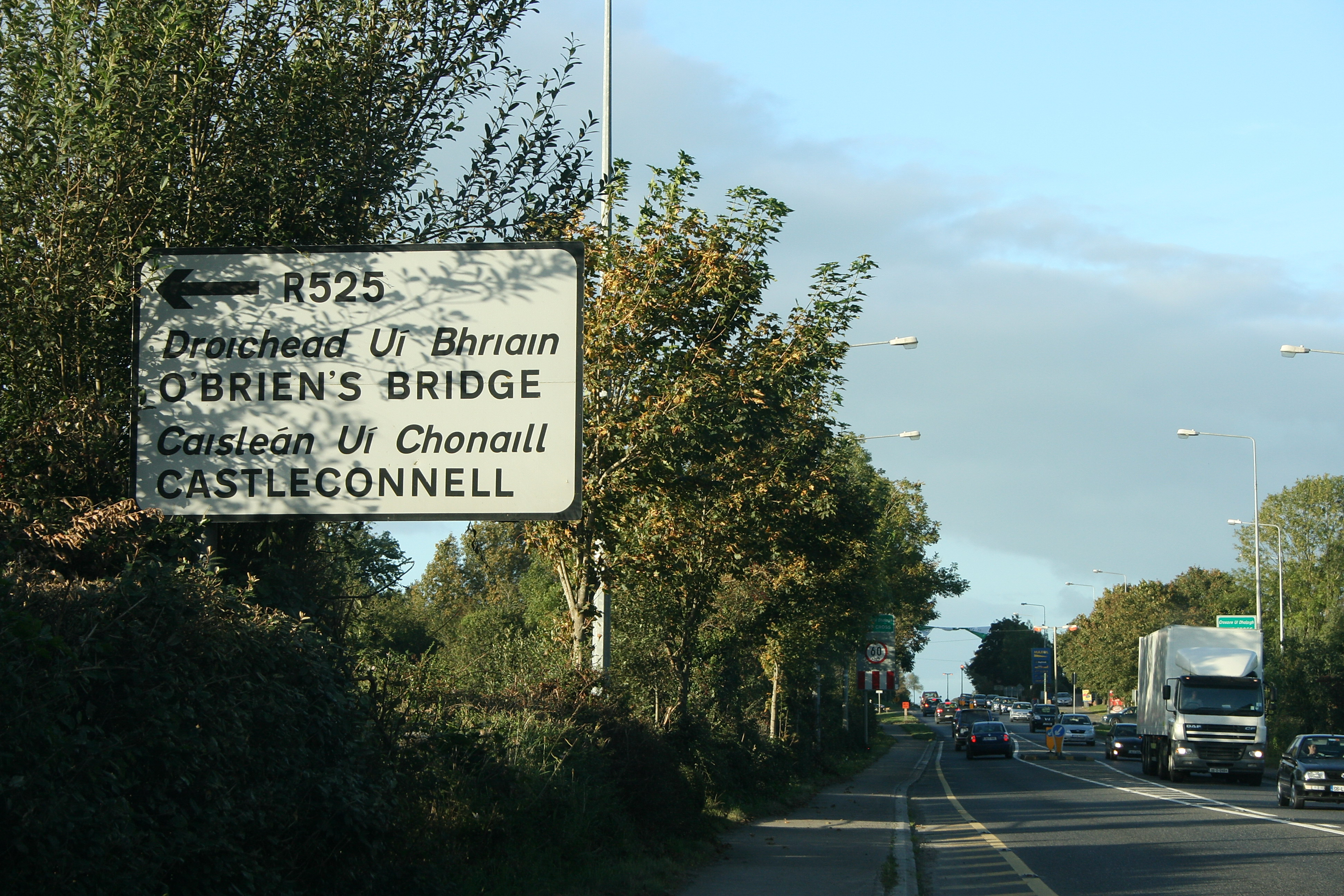
- The village on the then N7 road, now the R445

- Location in Ireland
- Coordinates: 52°42′34″N 8°29′27″W
- Country: Ireland
- Province: Munster
- County: County Limerick
- Time zone: UTC+0 (WET)
  - Summer (DST): UTC-1 (IST (WEST))
- Irish Grid Reference: R660627

Daly's Cross (Irish: Crosaire Uí Dhalaigh) is a small settlement in County Limerick, Ireland, about 12 km (7 mi) east of Limerick city, at the junction of the R445 and R525 roads. The village was bypassed in September 2010 by the M7. Previously, Daly's Cross had been considered a dangerous junction and endured heavy traffic, as the R445 formed part of the old N7 Dublin to Limerick primary route.

== Transport ==
Castleconnell railway station, which first opened to traffic on 8 August 1858, is nearby.

== See also ==
- List of towns and villages in Ireland
