= Johnstown, County Kildare =

Village in County Kildare, Ireland

Johnstown Baile Eoin
- Village
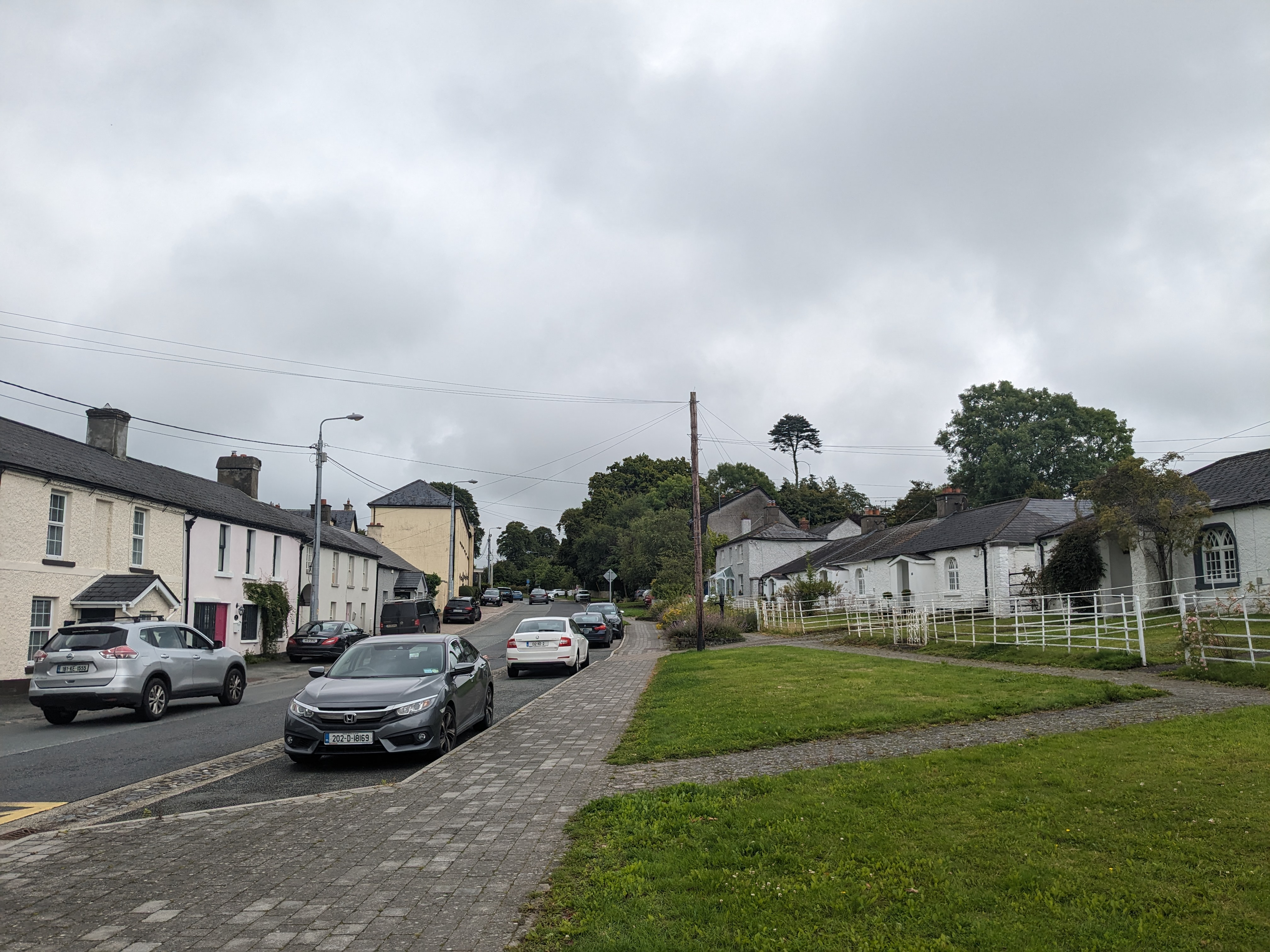
- Main Street, Johnstown

- Location in Ireland
- Coordinates: 53°14′06″N 6°37′21″W
- Country: Ireland
- Province: Leinster
- County: County Kildare

Population (2022)
  - Total: 1,320
- Time zone: UTC+0 (WET)
  - Summer (DST): UTC-1 (IST (WEST))
- Irish Grid Reference: N893196

Johnstown (Irish: Baile Eoin) is a village in County Kildare, Ireland. It is located 2 km (1.2 mi) north of Naas just off the N7 at junction 8. It is approximately 25 km (16 mi) from Dublin city centre, and is a home for commuters working in Dublin and Naas. Most of the housing was built after 1990.

The village was set out as a planned settlement. It is in a civil parish of the same name.

The main street was a part of the old main road southwest from Dublin towards Cork and Limerick. The Johnstown Inn was a busy coaching stop until the 19th century, and outside it the Cork mail coach was stopped and burned at the start of the 1798 rebellion. It had a post office that closed in the 1920s. Its only shop, a Centra, closed in June 2025.

The village still has the ruins of the medieval St John's church that became a ruin after 1500 under the Tudor seizure of church property. The church was a satellite of St. John's (Hospitaller) Priory in Kilmainham, Dublin. The church is famous for the grave of the Earl of Mayo, the viceroy, who was killed in India in 1872.

The main road eventually bypassed Johnstown in 1964 when the Naas dual carriageway was finished. This was enlarged into the 6-lane N7 road from Dublin to Johnstown, after which it reduces to the 4-lane M7 motorway that runs towards Limerick.

== See also ==
- List of towns and villages in Ireland
