= N82 road =

Road in Ireland

N82 road
- Bóthar N82
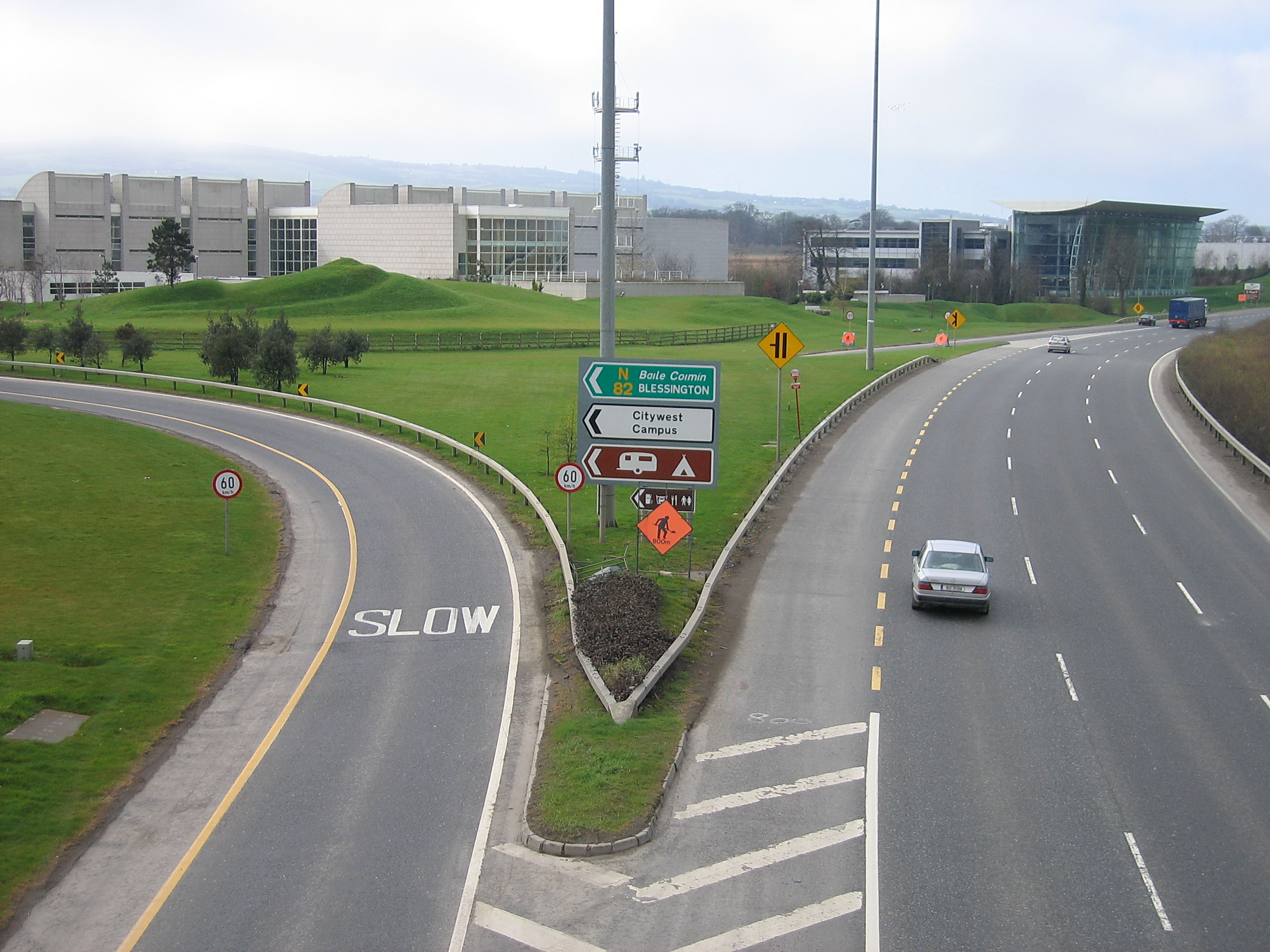
- N82 exit from N7 at Citywest

Location
- Country: Ireland

Highway system
- Roads in Ireland; Motorways; Primary; Secondary; Regional

The N82 road was a national secondary road in Ireland, and was located entirely in Dublin. The route was designated along the Citywest Road, which runs through the Citywest Business Campus between the N81 west of Tallaght and the Citywest Interchange of the N7 (Junction 3).

The nearby Belgard Road also connects the N7 and N81, as does the M50, but these are further in towards Dublin city along the busy and congested N7 road.

== History ==
Prior to 2006, the N82 route was designated as following the Mill Road through Saggart, between the N81 west of Tallaght and the N7 near Rathcoole.

The Citywest Route however was signposted as the N82 prior to the updating of the statutes in 2006 (and was marked on maps as such). Such circumstances are not unusual in Ireland; generally as soon as new road schemes are completed along national roads, the route designation is applied along the new road with new signage. To add to the confusion; in addition to the lack of statute updates (2006 being the first major update since 1994), old signage is often not removed from the original route (e.g. N7 national primary road (white on green) signage along the R445).

The old N82 route was signed as the N82 as well as the former route until late 2007.

The N82 road was redesignated as the L2011 local road in 2012.

=== Trivia ===
The route was urban over its entire length, which, at just over 2 km (1.2 mi) made the N82 by far the shortest national secondary road. Despite being recently built it had no hard shoulders, bus lanes or cycle tracks; it was single carriageway narrow two-lane road and had 6 roundabouts in those 2 kilometres.

The road was constructed in phases by the private developer of Citywest Business Campus to serve the development and handed over on completion of the final link between the N7 and the N81 to South Dublin County Council.

== See also ==
- Roads in Ireland
- Motorways in Ireland
- National primary road
- Regional road
