= Kinnegad River =

River in County Westmeath, Ireland

Physical characteristics
- Source
  - location: Kinnegad, County Westmeath

The Kinnegad River is a river in Kinnegad, County Westmeath, Ireland. The river is a tributary of the River Boyne, meeting it near the town of Clonard, County Meath.
