= R136 road (Ireland) =

Road in Ireland

R136 road
- Bóthar R136
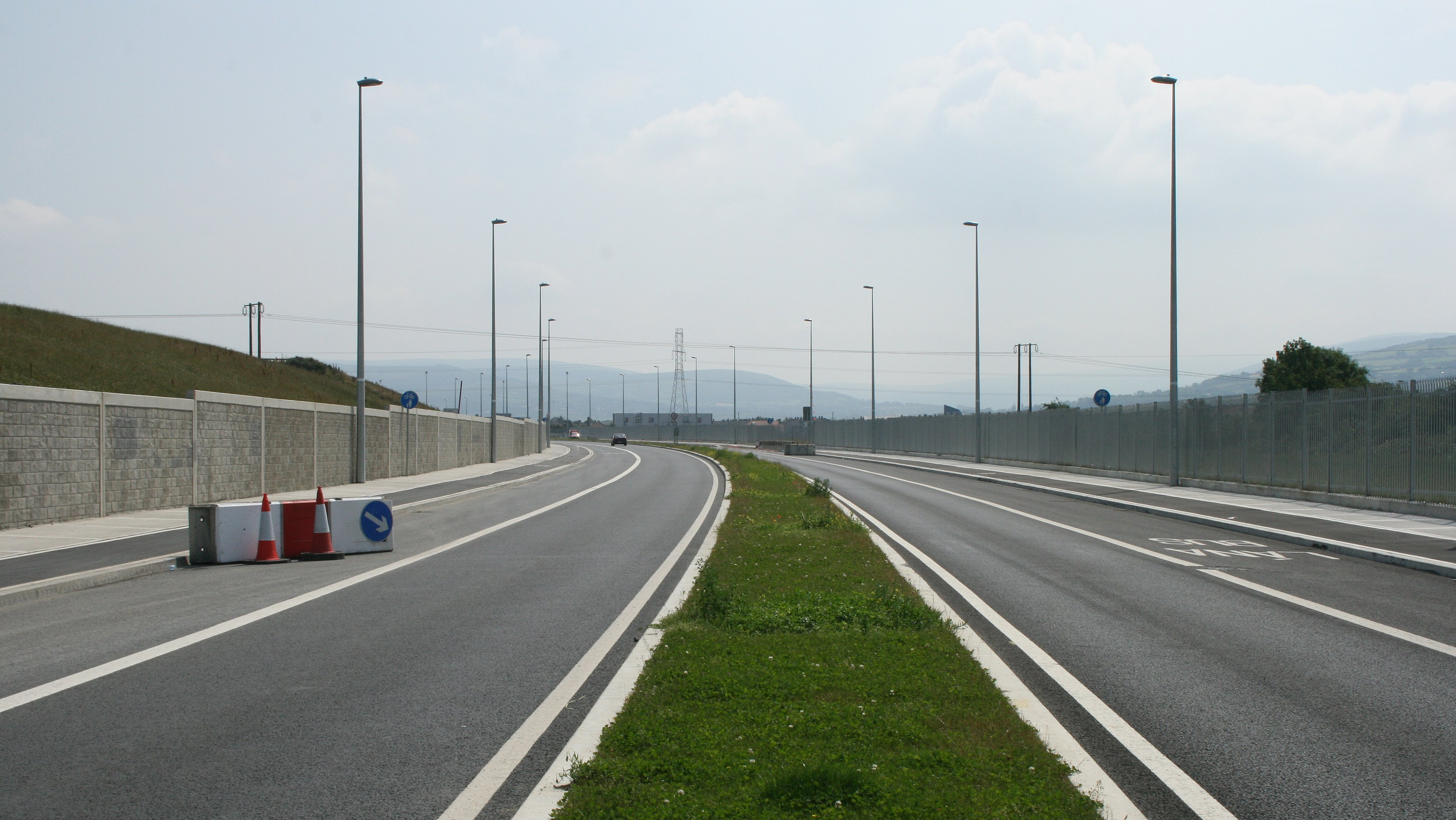
- Newest section of the R136 Outer Ring Road at Kingswood (note the bus lane)

Location
- Country: Ireland
- Primary destinations: Tallaght & Lucan

Highway system
- Roads in Ireland; Motorways; Primary; Secondary; Regional

The R136 road is a regional road in Ireland, located in the southwest of Dublin. Named the Outer Ring Road, the route, which is dual carriageway, runs from the N4 at Lucan to the N81 at Tallaght, bypassing west of Clondalkin (around Grange Castle) and crossing the N7 near Citywest. It was built as part of the planning for the new town of Adamstown.

== Route ==
The route was legislated in 2006 as commencing along the R835 near Lucan (Adamstown), and running south via Ballyowen Distributor Road and Grange Castle Road to Kingswood Interchange on the N7 (Junction 2). This forms "Phase 1" of the planned outer ring road (the M50 motorway being an inner ring road which should not be confused with the Inner Orbital Route, an Inner Ring in the inner City). Phase 2, which opened in December 2006, commences at the N4 road east of Lucan, passing through Ballyowen, with a junction for Adamstown, before linking up with the existing road at Grange Castle.

Almost the entire route is a dual carriageway, apart from the bridge over the N4. From the N4 to Adamstown, there is only one traffic lane and a bus lane in each direction (As the carriageways are separated by a jersey barrier this is still technically a dual carriageway). From Adamstown to Kingswood, the route has two lanes and a bus lane in each direction. However all junctions, other than the N4 junction and N7 flyover, are at-grade, and the median is rather narrow.

The term Outer Ring Road should not be confused with Outer Orbital Route, which refers to an indicative plan to construct a second motorway bypass ring around Dublin (after the M50), further out from the city. Nor should it be confused with the existing Outer Orbital Route which circles the inner city in the Dublin City Council area, outside the Inner Orbital Route.

Phase 3 of the road opened in July 2008, from the Kingswood Interchange (N7 J2) to the N81 Tallaght Bypass in Tallaght. This road was half a new build, half an upgrade of Cheeverstown Road and the junction of Cheeverstown Road and the N81. This section also included a provision for Luas Line A1 to cross it (tracks in the roadway). This facilitated works on the line, which began in February 2009, to proceed without having to make any further alterations to the road.

== Potential upgrades ==
Although provision had been made for the route to head further northwards, crossing the Liffey and joining the R121 road at Porterstown, the future bridge to be built linking these points will be for the proposed Metro West only. Such a road link would have linked with existing relatively high grade sections of the R121 to provide a ring road link from Cherryhound at the M2 in the north west of Dublin's suburbs back to the N81 to the south west.

== Planning dispute ==
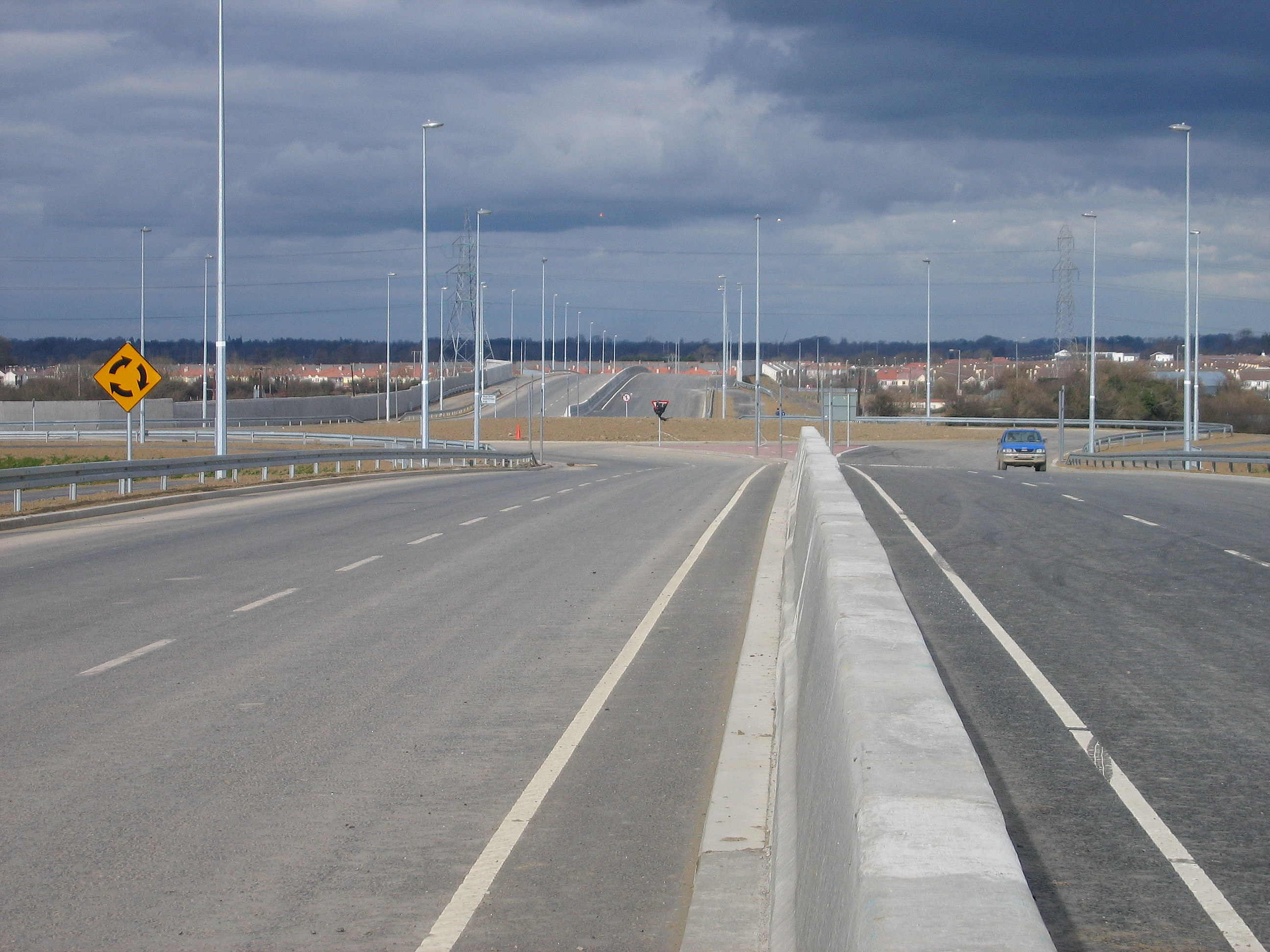
R136 dual carriageway at Grange Castle

When this road was being planned it was opposed by various interests. It was eventually completed with the semi-rural section through Grange Castle built as standard dual carriageway; two traffic lanes plus hard shoulder in each direction. It remained unopened for a time as Dublin City Council insisted that the bus lane run outside the hard shoulder so as to leave only one traffic lane (effectively the bus-lane would run down the centre of either carriageway). The local authority (South Dublin County Council) refused to open the road with such a bizarre arrangement and eventually the City Council relented.

== See also ==
- Roads in Ireland
- National primary road
- National secondary road
