= N4 road (Ireland) =

National primary road from Dublin to Sligo in Ireland

N4 road
- Bóthar N4

Route information
- Length: 198.21 km (123.16 mi)

Location
- Country: Ireland
- Primary destinations: (bypassed routes in italics): County Dublin; Dublin (M50); County Kildare; Leixlip; Maynooth; Kilcock; County Meath; Enfield; Clonard; County Westmeath; Kinnegad (M6 to Galway); Mullingar (N52); Ballinalack; Rathowen; County Longford; Edgeworthstown (N55); Longford Town (N5 to Westport, N63); Newtownforbes; County Leitrim; Roosky; Dromod; Aghamore; Drumsna; Jamestown; Carrick-on-Shannon (R280); County Roscommon; Boyle (N61); County Sligo; Ballinafad; Castlebaldwin; Collooney (N17); Ballysadare (N59); Sligo (N15, N16)

Highway system
- Roads in Ireland; Motorways; Primary; Secondary; Regional

M4 motorway
- Mótarbhealach M4

Route information
- Length: 62 km (39 mi)
- Existed: 1994–present
- History: Completed 1994–2006

Major junctions
- From: Dublin
- J11 → M6 motorway
- To: Kinnegad

Location
- Country: Ireland
- Primary destinations: Leixlip, Kilcock, Enfield

Highway system
- Roads in Ireland; Motorways; Primary; Secondary; Regional

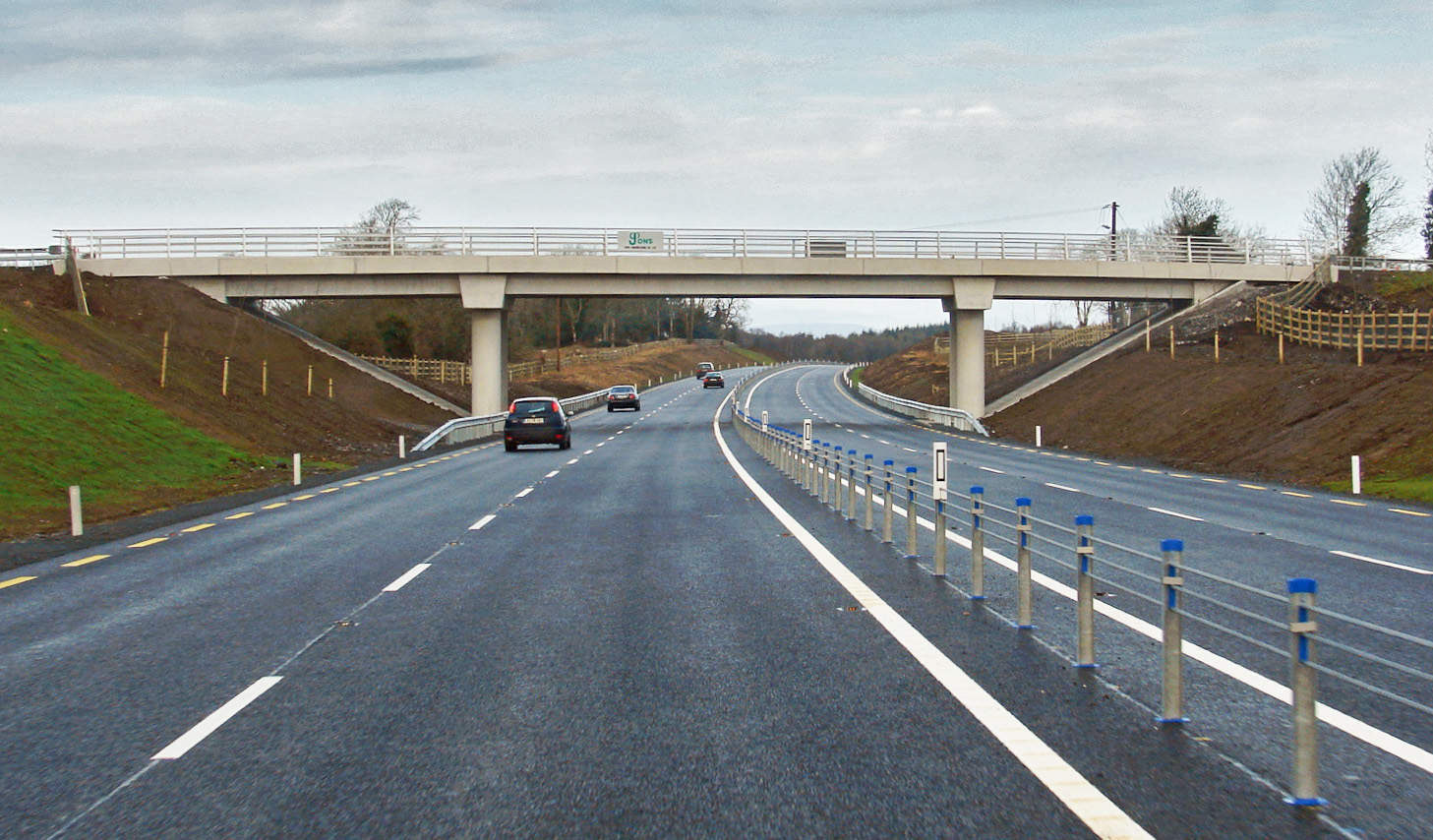
The 2+2 section of the N4.

The N4 road is a national primary road in Ireland, running from Dublin to the northwest of Ireland and Sligo town. The M6 to Galway diverges from this route after Kinnegad, while the N5 to Westport diverges at Longford town. Most sections of the N4 that are motorway-standard are designated the M4 motorway.

== Road standard ==
The N4 originates at an intersection with the M50 motorway at Junction 7. This is also Junction 1 of the N/M4. The Liffey Valley Shopping Centre is located at Junction 2. The road has three lanes and a bus lane in each direction between the M50 and Junction 5 which is also the start of the M4 motorway at Leixlip.

The N4 was the only one of the main inter-urban national routes whose dual-carriageway section continued into the city centre; however, the section inside the M50 was re-classified as the R148 in 2012.

Heading west, the PPP motorway section (see below) ends west of Kinnegad, and the motorway terminates 5 km further west; it continues as HQDC and bypasses Mullingar. From the Mullingar bypass to Edgeworthstown, the road is a wide single-carriageway with hard shoulders. After Longford, the road passes through Newtown Forbes and there is a lower standard single-carriageway road between Newtown Forbes and Roosky. Between Longford and Rooskey single carriageway continues at a higher standard. Dromod and Rooskey were bypassed in late 2007. This section of the road consists of three roundabouts and a Type 2 dual carriageway, i.e.: two lanes in each direction and no hard shoulder. The road resumes as a single carriageway with hard shoulders until it reaches Carrick-on-Shannon, where it becomes a local urban road through five roundabouts, and passes over the River Shannon into County Roscommon. The road becomes a high-quality single carriageway bypass 3 km outside of Boyle town, with periodic alternating overtaking lanes passing Lough Key Forest Park and Ballinafad until it reaches Castlebaldwin. From Castlebaldwin to Collooney the road is a Type 2 dual carriageway. Funding for the expansion of this section was announced in October 2018, and it opened in 2021. The road becomes near-motorway standard dual carriageway again at Collooney, approaching Sligo town.

== M4 motorway ==
The section from Leixlip to the west of Kinnegad is the M4 motorway. The first section of this motorway (Leixlip – Kilcock) was opened on 19 December 1994.

=== Tolled section of the M4 motorway ===
Under the Government announcement of the pilot projects on 1 June 1999 this project was to be assessed by the NRA for its suitability to be advanced as a Public-private partnership (PPP). Subsequently, the project was included as one of the projects approved under Tranche II of the PPP Roads programme as announced by the NRA in June 2000. The project involved the construction of 39 km of motorway from Kinnegad to Kilcock and is an extension of the Kilcock-Maynooth-Leixlip motorway on the N4/N6 Sligo/Galway to Dublin route. The motorway bypasses the towns of Enfield and Kinnegad.

The PPP contract was awarded in March 2003 to the EuroLink Consortium (SIAC Construction Ltd and Cintra - Concesiones de Infraestructuras de Transporte S.A.) and allows for them to collect tolls for 30 years from that date.

This tolled section (from Kilcock to Kinnegad) opened on 12 December 2005, almost a year ahead of schedule. It is the second-most expensive toll road in Ireland (after the Dublin Port Tunnel). A toll of €3.50 (as of 2025) for cars is charged at a toll plaza just west of Kilcock and at smaller toll plazas at on and off-ramps at Enfield. Between Enfield and Kinnegad, no further access to the M4 is possible.

Eurolink operates this tolling scheme, the first in Ireland not operated by NTR plc. From 2005 to 2007, Eurolink started to accept several tags issued by other motorways such as M1, M8, eTrip and Dublin Port Tunnel tags. On 14 June 2007 NTR plc joined the Nationwide Electronic Toll Payment System introducing their popular EazyPass tags on the system and allowing all other toll plazas in the country (different from those owned by NTR plc) to accept them, meaning that each toll company's electronic tag will work on all toll roads in the State.

In the 1 July 2006 edition of the Meath Chronicle it was claimed that up to 10% of the €420 million road project had "to be ripped up and replaced" shortly after it opened due to rushed construction, however this cost would have had to be carried by the toll operators, not the state, as per the contract.

The bypassed former N4 road has been reclassified as the R148.

=== Motorway reclassification ===
On 28 August 2009, the Department of Transport implemented the second round of proposed reclassifications of dual carriageways as motorways under the Roads Act 2007. A short section of the N4 between Kinnegad (J12) and McNead's Bridge (J13) was affected by this. This extended the M4 westward by 6.8 km.

== Junctions ==
The route begins as a dual carriageway at junction 7 of the M50, becoming a motorway after junction 5. It then becomes a dual carriageway after junction 13. After Mullingar, it becomes a regular national road.

County	km	mi	Junction	Destinations	Notes
County Dublin
County Dublin	0.5	0.3	1	M50 – Dublin Airport, Dublin Port, Dún Laoghaire	Continues as R148 towards Dublin city centre and Palmerstown.
County Dublin	1.5	0.9	2	R113 ‒ Fonthill, Liffey Valley	
County Dublin	2.5	1.6	2a	Ballyowen Lane	Westbound exit only. Exit lane runs parallel to mainline, ending at slip road at junction 3.
County Dublin	3.5	2.2	3	R136 – Ballyowen, Lucan	
County Dublin	5.5	3.4	4	R120 – Lucan, Adamstown	
County Dublin	6	3.7	4a	L1018 – Dodsboro, Kew Park	Only Dodsboro is signposted on eastbound approach. Exit lane runs parallel to mainline, ending at slip road at junction 5.
County Dublin	7	4.3	5	R148 – Celbridge, Leixlip (westbound)	Heading eastbound, both destinations are followed by the (East) cardinal direction. Continues as M4 motorway.
County Kildare
County Kildare	11	6.8	6	R449 ‒ Celbridge (West), Leixlip (West)	Dunboyne
County Kildare	15	9.3	7	R406 ‒ Maynooth, Naas	Straffan
County Kildare	23	14.3	8	R148 ‒ Kilcock R407 – Clane	Enfield, Trim
County Kildare	26.5	16.5	M4 Toll		
County Meath	34	21.1	9	R402 ‒ Edenderry, Enfield	Toll at westbound entrance and eastbound exit slip roads.
County Kildare	36	22.4	Enfield Service Area		
County Meath	51	31.7	10	R401 ‒ Kinnegad	Eastbound entrance and westbound exit only.
County Westmeath	52	32.3	11	M6 ‒ Galway, Athlone	Tullamore (N52)
County Westmeath	53.5	33.2	12	R148 ‒ Kinnegad, Galway (M6)	Westbound entrance and eastbound exit only.
County Westmeath	60.5	37.6	13	L1025 ‒ Coralstown	LILO junction. Continues as N4 dual carriageway.
County Westmeath	62.5	38.8	14	R156 ‒ Killucan, The Downs	
County Westmeath	64.5	40.1		L5720	LILO junction. Eastbound entrance and exit only.
County Westmeath	68	42.2	15	N52 ‒ Tullamore, Mullingar (East)	
County Westmeath	69.5	43.2	16	N52 ‒ Dundalk, Mullingar (Centre)	
County Westmeath	71.5	44.4	17	R394 ‒ Castlepollard, Mullingar (West)	Mullingar Hospital; Continues as N4 regular national road.
1.000 mi = 1.609 km; 1.000 km = 0.621 mi: Incomplete access; Tolled; Route transition

== Bypasses ==
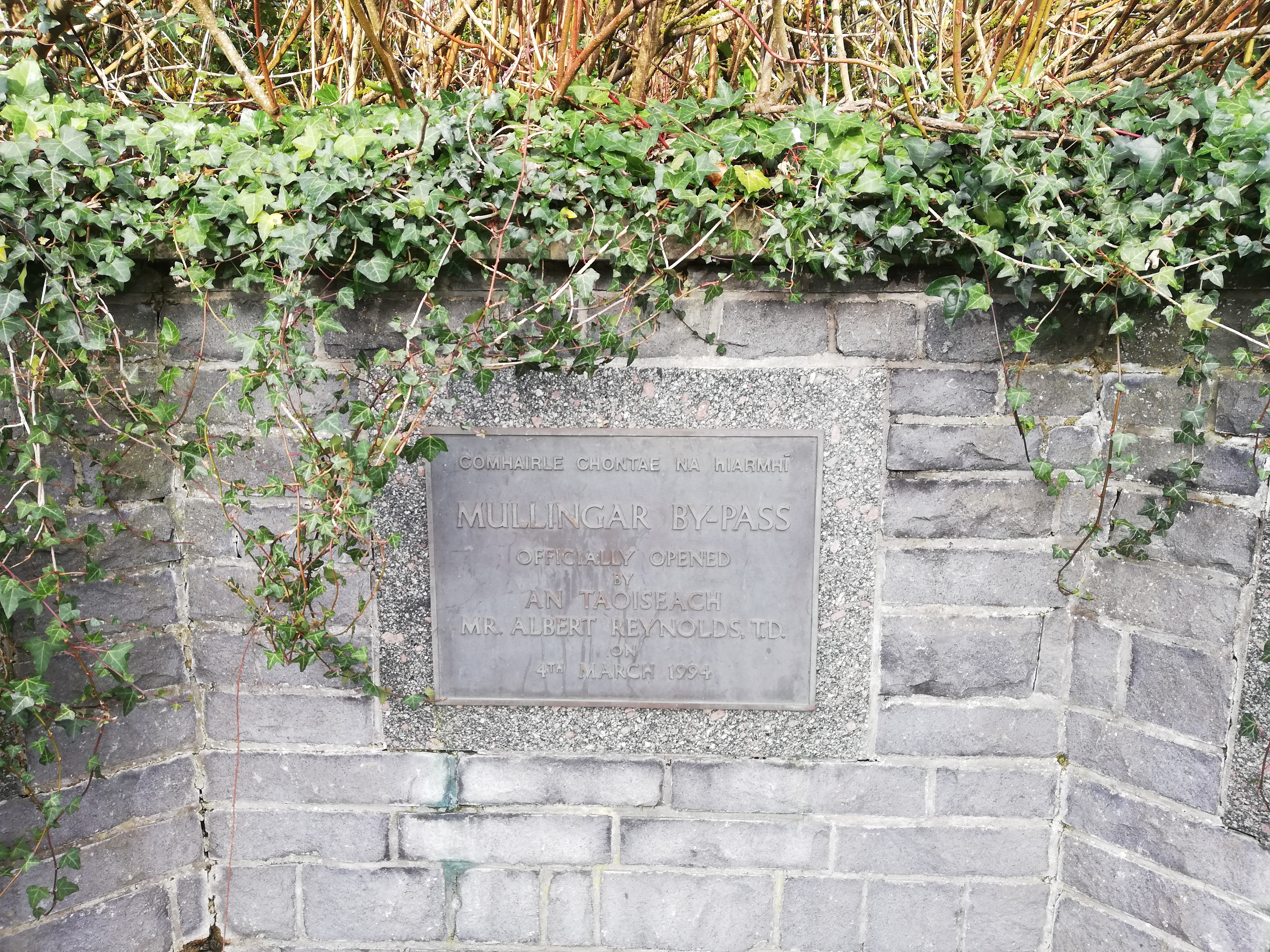
Sign in Mullingar marking the opening of the bypass by Taoiseach (and TD for Longford–Westmeath) Albert Reynolds

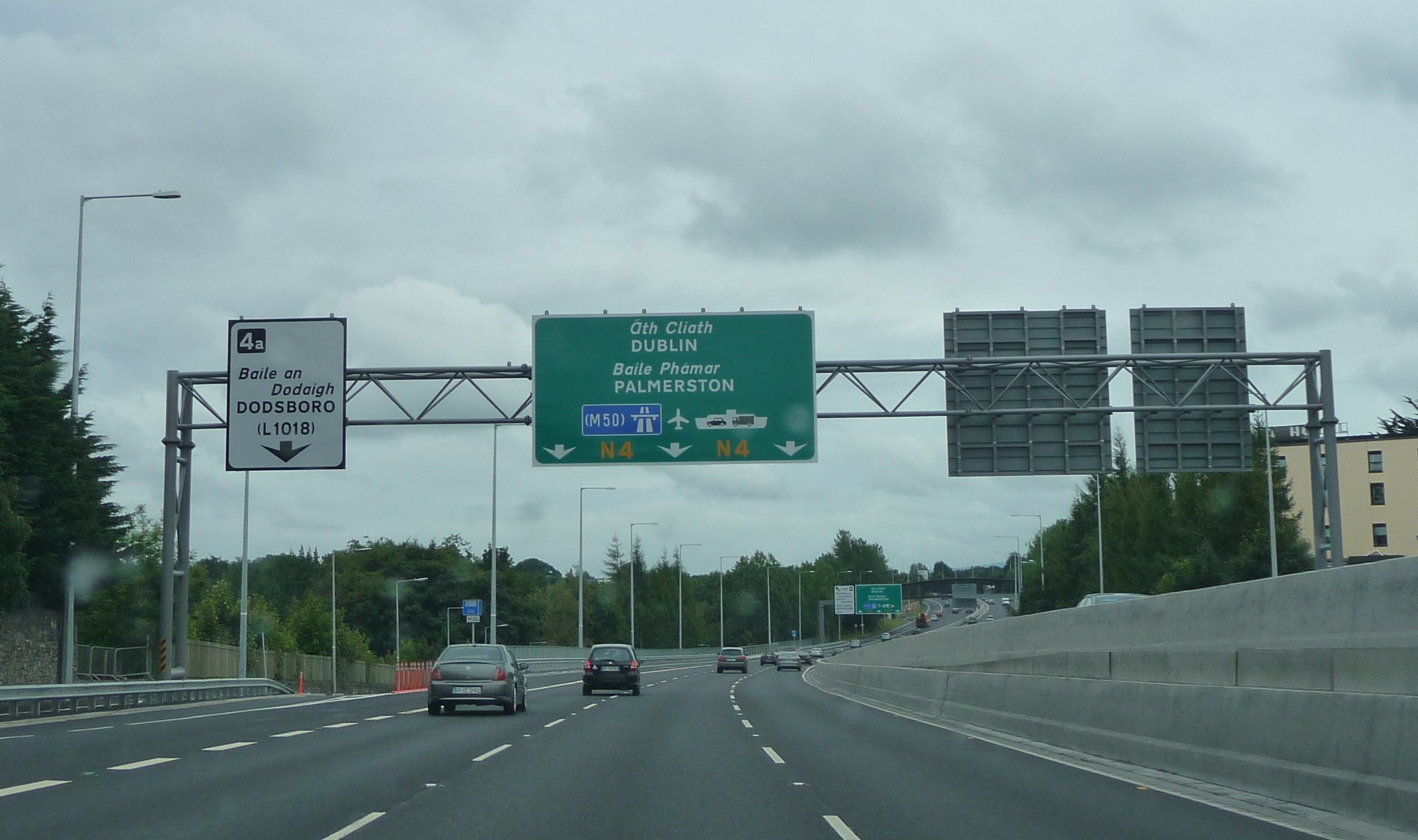
Travelling East along the upgraded Lucan Bypass in west Dublin

- Palmerstown – 1984
- Lucan – 1988
- Leixlip, Maynooth, Kilcock – 1994
- Mullingar – 1994
- Longford – 1995
- Drumsna, Jamestown – 1997
- Collooney, Ballisodare – January 1998
- Boyle, Ballinafad – 1998–1999
- Sligo (partial) – September 2005
- Enfield, Kinnegad – December 2005
- Edgeworthstown – June 2006
- Dromod, Roosky – December 2007
- Castlebaldwin – August 2021

== Upgrades ==
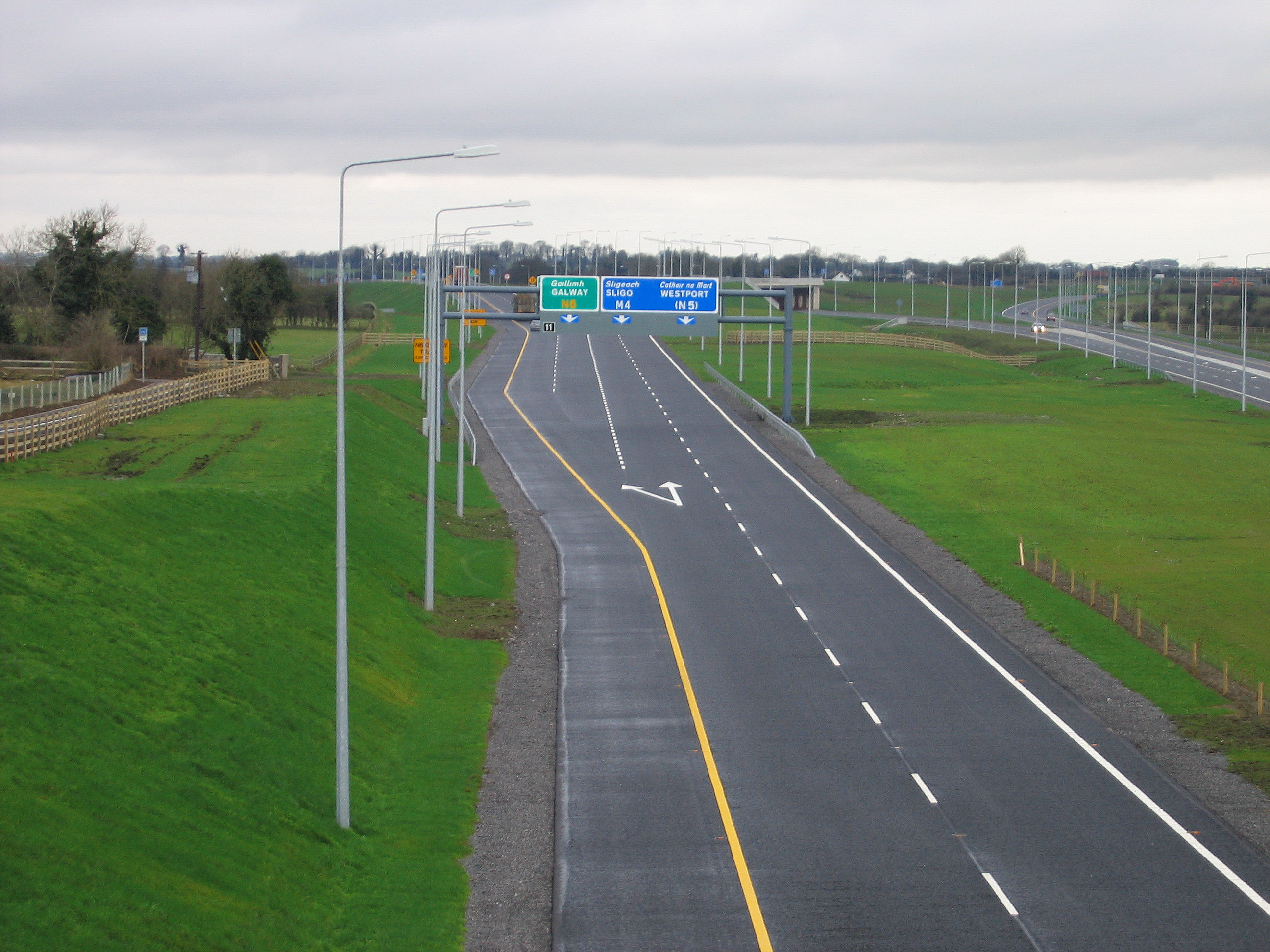
J11; M6/M4 junction (prior to redesignation of the N6 → M6).

In July 2009, an upgrade of the section between the M50 junction and the Leixlip interchange was completed. In this section the road is three lanes in each direction, the median crossings were removed and the junction with the R120 is a fully grade-separated junction. Private accesses and some left turns remain which prevents the section from being designated a motorway. The speed limit is 80 km/h. There are currently no signal-controlled junctions on the N/M4 between the M50 motorway and the Sligo through-pass.

In 2013, a 5 km stretch of dual carriageway with at-grade crossover junctions between the M4 and the Mullingar bypass was upgraded to HQDC.

Construction of a 2+2 road at the 15 km stretch between Collooney and Castlebaldwin began in 2019 to improve road safety. The road was opened on 18 October 2021.

=== Planned improvements to the route ===
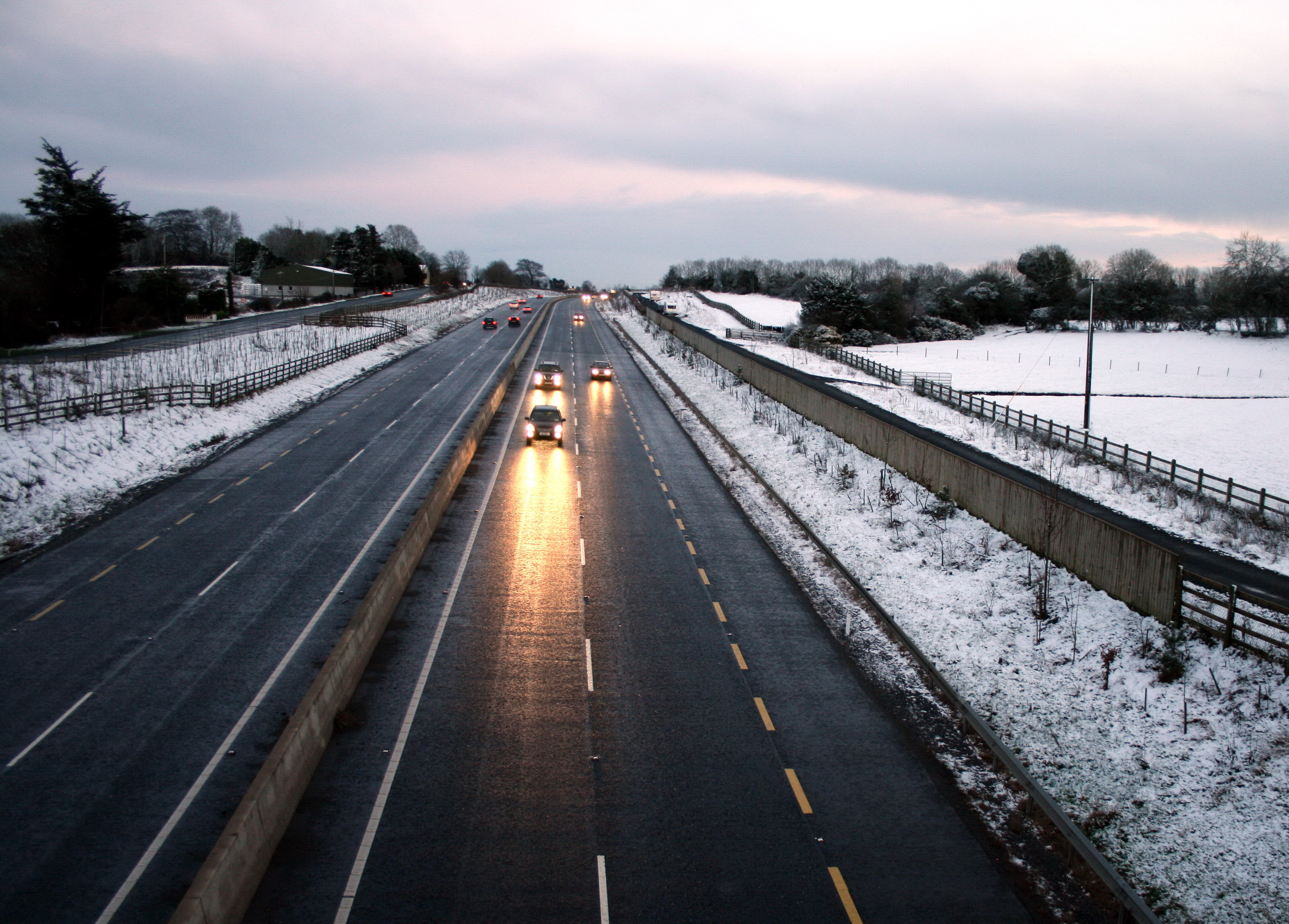
N4 between Kinnegad and Mullingar; former N4 (now R148) in left of the picture. (This section was redesignated as a motorway in August 2009)

- Mullingar to Longford; 40 km dual carriageway, including bypass of Longford Town. As of June 2026, Phase 3: Design and Environmental Evaluation, is in progress. This comprises continued development of the emerging design of the route corridor, carrying out engineering and environmental surveys, and direct engagement with impacted landowners along the route.
- The section between Dromod and Carrick-on-Shannon was originally set for bypass and realignment in the "N4 Carrick-on-Shannon to Dromod Project", but as of September 2025, the project was renamed the "N4 Carrick-on-Shannon Bypass & Traffic Management Project" to better describe the route constraints, as the village of Aghamore will no longer be bypassed.

== See also ==
- Roads in Ireland
- Motorways in Ireland
- National secondary road
- Regional road
