= Newlands Cross =

Junction and residential area in South County Dublin, Ireland

Coordinates: 53.313°N 6.391°W

Newlands Cross is a junction and residential area in the south-west of County Dublin in Ireland. The name Newlands has been recorded in the area since at least the year 1313.

It is located at the point where the N7 national route to the South West and Mid West crosses an orbital local route, the R113.

== Newlands House ==
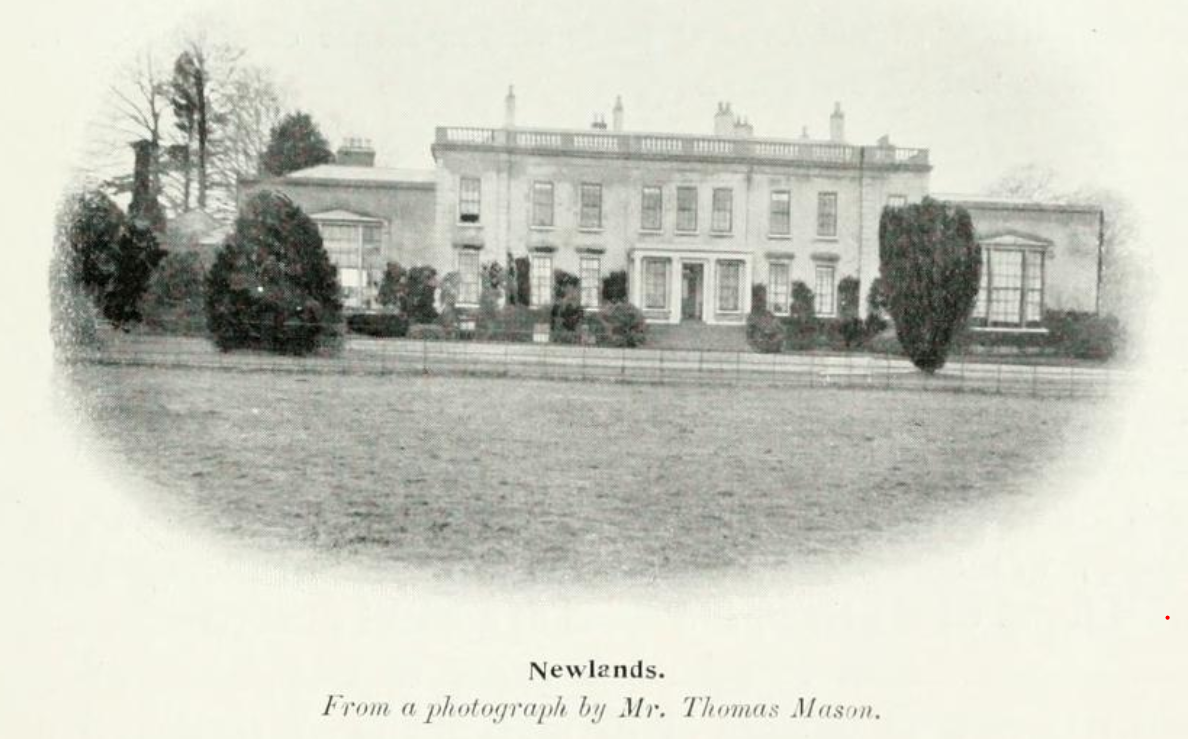
Newlands House, Dublin

Newlands House and estate was located in the area and gave the junction its name. The estate was owned from 1776 by Arthur Wolfe, 1st Viscount Kilwarden who had his city townhouse at 5 Leinster Street. On the 23 July 1803 he left the house in his carriage with his daughter and nephew to go to the relevant safety of the city to escape the rebels who were supporters of Robert Emmet. Kilwarden and his nephew were later pulled from his carriage and assassinated by stabbing on Thomas Street by a group of insurgents.

Later the house and estate were used by a Quaker group led by a Joshua Jacob from around 1845-51.

The house later became the clubhouse of Newlands Golf Club but was demolished in 1981.

== Road junction ==
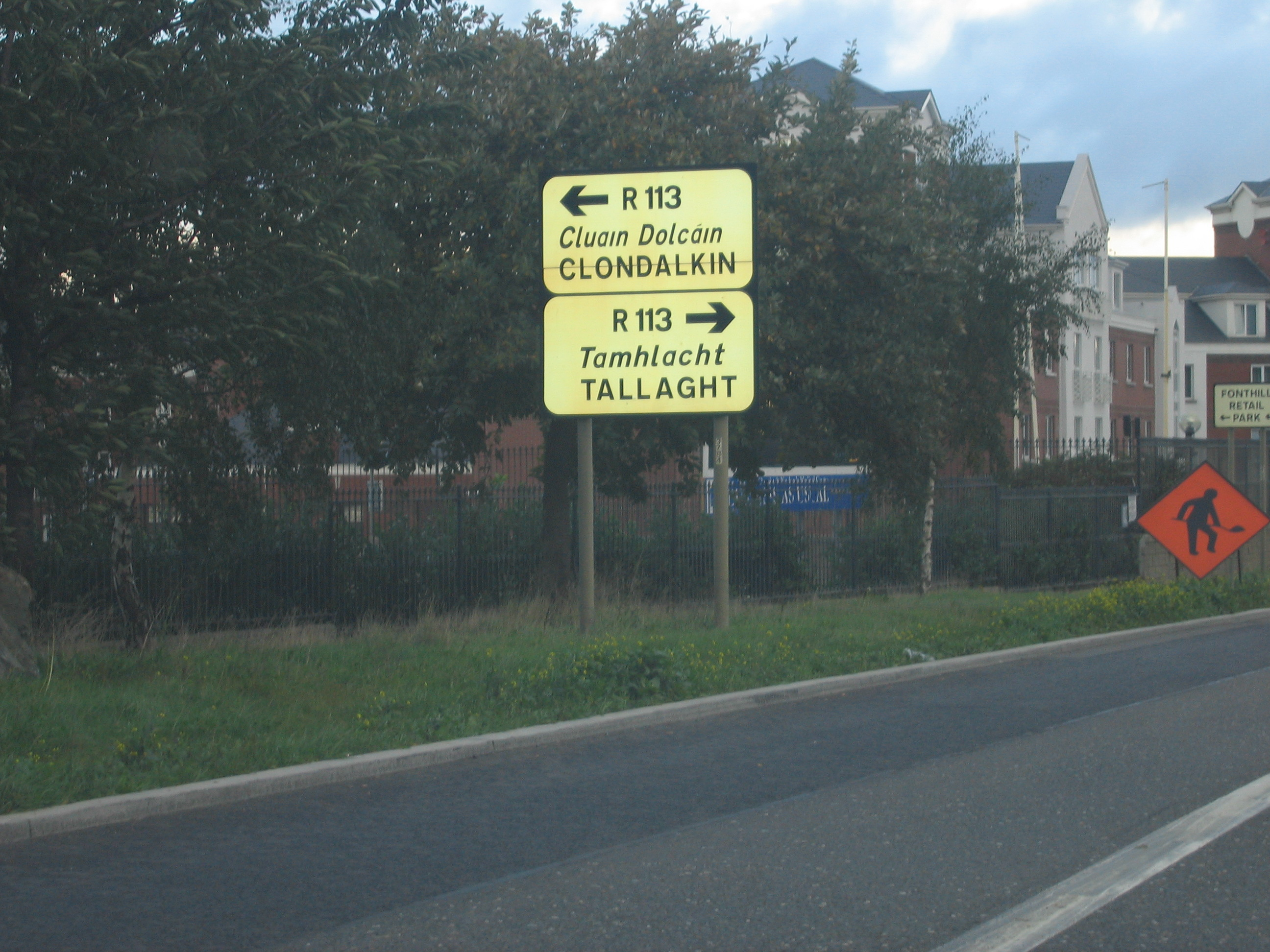
Newland's Cross on the N7, approaching from the West before its upgrade

The R113 (in the form of the Belgard Road dual-carriageway) joins Newlands to Tallaght in the South and to the Fonthill Road in Clondalkin village to the North; the cross itself is located at the southern end of Clondalkin.

By 2007, the signal-controlled junction was suffering serious traffic congestion and the upgrade to a grade-separated interchange was planned. The upgraded N7 would pass over the R113. Construction went to tender in August 2008 and preparatory work started in September 2008. Following delays, construction proper started in June 2013 and was expected to be completed in May 2015. The new flyover opened to traffic ahead of schedule on 20 November 2014 and eliminated the last signal-controlled crossing on the N7/M7 route between the M50 and Limerick. Prior to the flyover the junction was also notable as the only set of traffic lights on the cross-country route between Cork and Northern Ireland. Further works continued on the slip roads alongside the flyover until March 2015.

=== Murder of Veronica Guerin ===
Crime journalist Veronica Guerin was shot and killed in 1996 while queuing in traffic at nearby Boot Road junction (now closed). A memorial to her is located at the site of the incident, the "Boot Road" slip approximately 300 metres west of the junction.
