= R113 road (Ireland) =

Road in Ireland

R113 road
- Bóthar R113
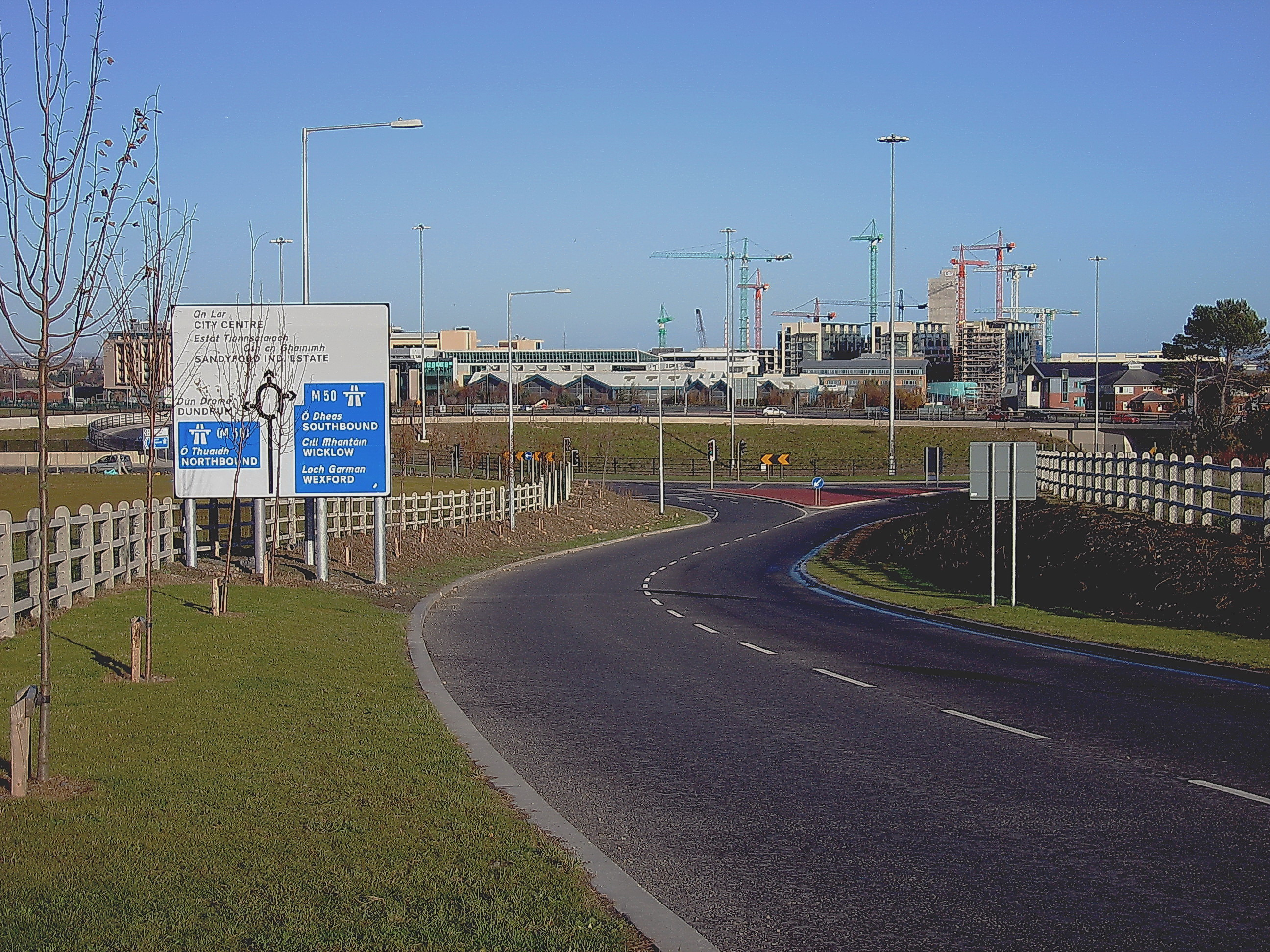
- R113 at Sandyford

Route information
- Length: 23.9 km (14.9 mi)

Location
- Country: Ireland
- Primary destinations: Dún Laoghaire–Rathdown; Blackrock (N31, R119, R827); Leopardstown (N11); Sandyford (N31, M50 J13E, R133), (Luas Green Line); Ballinteer (M50 J13W, R133, R826); Marlay Park (R822); South Dublin; Ballyboden (R115), R116); Crosses the Owendoher River; Knocklyon (M50 J12); Firhouse (R114); Crosses the River Dodder at Old Bawn Bridge; Tallaght (N81); Belgard (R838, (Luas Red Line); Newlands Cross (N7 J1a); Clondalkin (R134); Crosses the Grand Canal; Clondalkin & Fonthill railway station; Liffey Valley (R833, N4 J2)

Highway system
- Roads in Ireland; Motorways; Primary; Secondary; Regional

The R113 road is a regional road in Ireland. Located in Dublin, it forms a semi-orbital route around the south of the city. As of 2007, clockwise, it starts at the N31 at Temple Hill in Blackrock and ends at a junction with the N4 at Palmerstown.

The road is one of the busiest Regional Roads in Ireland. The Liffey Valley Shopping Centre, and The Square, Tallaght, two of the busiest shopping centres in Ireland, are both located just off the route. Both the Fonthill Road (in Lucan/Clondalkin) and Belgard Road (in Tallaght) sections also have a number of large retail outlets. The Belgard Road section, running between the N7 at Newlands Cross and the N81 at Tallaght, is a standard dual carriageway and the main thoroughfare in the Tallaght area.

== Route ==
The official description of the R113 from the Roads Act 1993 (Classification of Regional Roads) Order 2012 reads:

R113: Fonthill - Blackrock, County Dublin

Between its junction with N4 at Fonthill and its junction with N7 at Newland's Cross via Fonthill Road North, Nangor Road and Fonthill Road South all in the county of South Dublin

and

between its junction with N7 at Newland's Cross and its junction with N81 at Tallaght Bypass via Belgard Road and Belgard Road Extension all in the county of South Dublin

and

between its junction with N81 at Tallaght Bypass in the county of South Dublin and its junction with N31 at Leopardstown Road in the county of DunLaoghaire - Rathdown via Old Bawn Road, Killininney Road, Saint Colmcille's Way, Scholarstown Road, Ballyboden Way, Taylor's Lane and Grange Road in the county of South Dublin: Grange Road, Brohenfield Road, Motorway Service Roads and Murphystown in the county of Dún Laoghaire–Rathdown

and

between its junction with N31 at Brewery Road and its junction with N31 at Temple Road Blackrock via Leopardstown Road, Newtownpark Avenue, Stradbrook Road and Temple Hill all in the county of Dún Laoghaire–Rathdown

As of April 2018 based and based on the Ordnance Survey map of Dublin (Sixth Edition, updated Sept 2005) and the 2006 legislation defining a new route, the former R113 route was changed to:

- Start at Temple Hill in Blackrock at its junction with the N31.
- Top of Temple Hill fork to Stradbrook Road.
- Turn right up into Newtownpark Avenue.
- Up Newtownpark Avenue
- Cross the N11 at White's Cross and proceed along Leopardstown Road to the junction at Brewery Road (N31)/Sandyford Industrial Estate.
- Pass under the Luas green line and follow dual-carriageway (on the N31/Leopardstown Road) to J14 of the M50.
- Cross the M50 and follow the western end of the Leopardstown Road to a new junction at Hillcrest/Kilgobbin Rd.
- Goes sharp right at Hillcrest down the new Kilgobbin Road Extension (in the thumbnail), to a rotary junction over the M50 (J13 East).
- Follows two parallel roads either side of the M50 (two-lane one-way roads, in effect a dual carriageway with the M50 in the median) to a dumbbell junction under the M50 (J13 West).
- From here it goes west along Brehon Fields Road (part of the Green Route) and then follows Grange Road past Marlay Park; on to Taylor's Lane as far as Ballyboden roundabout, where it intersects the R115
- Continues west along Ballyboden Way; Templeroan; Scholarstown Road to cross the M50 again at Junction 12 (Knocklyon).
- Continues west along St. Collumkilles Rd; Scholarstown Link Rd to a junction with the R114 (Firhouse/Bohernabreena Roads).
- Veers north along the Old Bawn Road and joins the N81 in Tallaght Town centre.
- After following the N81 west for 0.5 km it branches north along the Belgard Road dual-carriageway as far as Newlands Cross.
- It passes under the N7, and follows the Fonthill Rd north west bypassing central Clondalkin. Clondalkin/Fonthill railway station is located on R113 at this point.
- It crosses the R134 at a double roundabout junction and follows the Fonthill Road North for 5 km (3.1 mi) before terminating at a grade separated junction (junction 2) with the N4 at Quarryvale/Liffey Valley Shopping Centre.
- Plans to carry the road north, across the River Liffey, have been abandoned.

== See also ==
- Roads in Ireland
- National primary road
- National secondary road
- Regional road
