= R110 road (Ireland) =

Road in Ireland

R110 road
- Bóthar R110
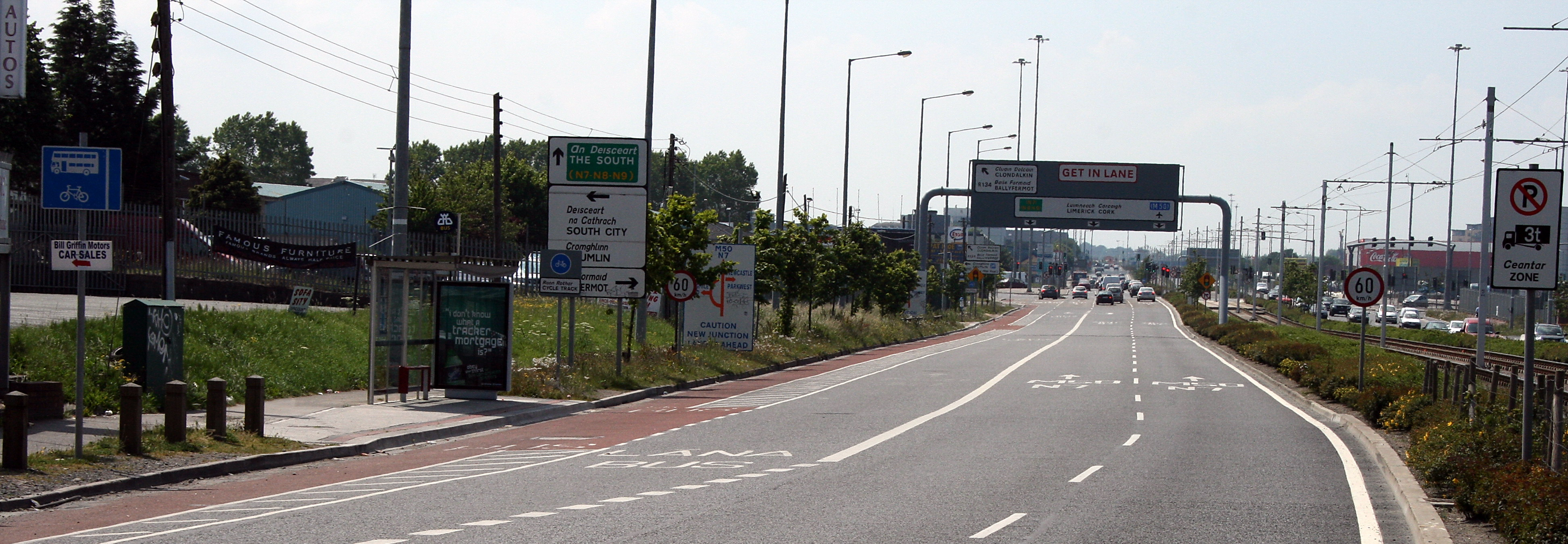
- The Naas Road; ahead past the junction it becomes the R110, section in foreground is the R810, a six-lane dual-carriageway

Location
- Country: Ireland

Highway system
- Roads in Ireland; Motorways; Primary; Secondary; Regional

The R110 road is a regional road in Ireland which goes from St Stephen's Green to Red Cow, Dublin. Its route is completely within the Dublin urban area.

Some of the route is the original route of the N7 road prior to the construction of the Chapelizod bypass on the N4, at which point N7 traffic was redirected to use the M50 motorway and N4 road instead to travel between Dublin city centre and the Red Cow roundabout. It is therefore the alternative route for motorway prohibited traffic for this section of the N7.

== Route ==
(NE – SW) Between its junction with R138 at Saint Stephens Green East in the city of Dublin and its junction with M50 at Red Cow in the county of South Dublin via Saint Stephens Green South, Cuffe Street, Kevin Street Lower, Kevin Street Upper, Dean Street, The Coombe, Cork Street Extension, Cork Street, Dolphins Barn Street, Dolphins Barn, Dolphins Barn Bridge, Crumlin Road, Drimnagh Road and Long Mile Road in the city of Dublin: Long Mile Road and Naas Road in the county of South Dublin.

== See also ==
- Roads in Ireland
- National primary road
- National secondary road
- Regional road
