= Citywest =

Suburban development of Dublin, Ireland

Citywest Iarthair na Cathrach (Irish)
- Suburban development
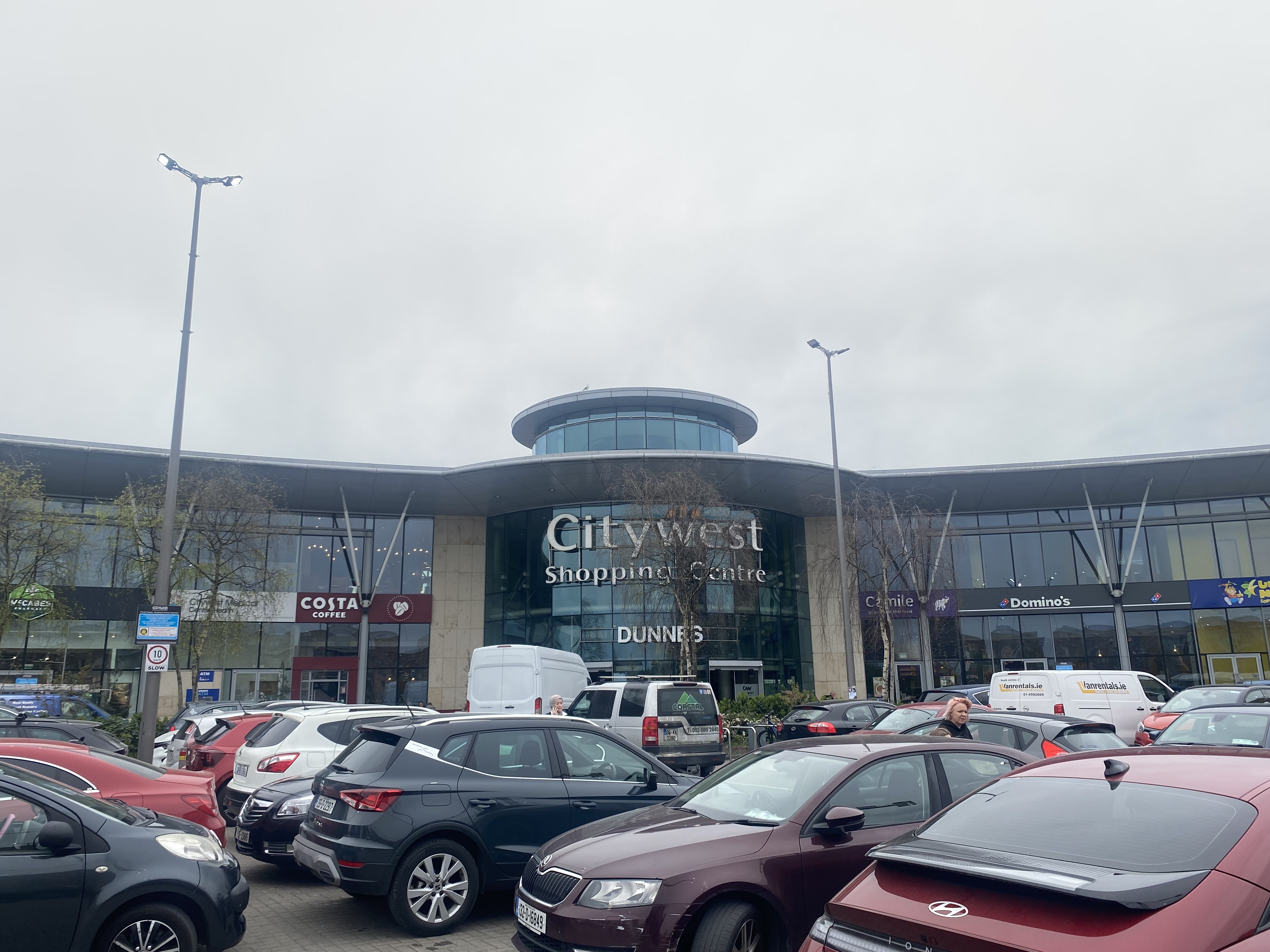
- Citywest Shopping Centre

- Map showing Citywest's location in County Dublin
- Coordinates: 53°17′16″N 6°25′51″W
- Country: Ireland
- Province: Leinster
- County: County Dublin
- Local authority: South Dublin County Council
- Established: circa 1990

Government
  - Dáil constituency: Dublin Mid-West

Population (2016)
  - Total: 8,390
- Time zone: UTC+0 (WET)
  - Summer (DST): UTC-1 (IST (WEST))
- Eircode routing key: D22, D24

Citywest (Irish: Iarthar na Cathrach) is a suburban development near Dublin, Ireland, originally developed as a "business campus." It contains a large hotel and convention centre, now in use for international protection applicant accommodation, a small shopping centre and a small but expanding residential element. Citywest is in the southwest of the traditional County Dublin, within the jurisdiction of South Dublin County Council; the nearest major suburban centre is Tallaght, while the village of Saggart is adjacent.

== History ==
Citywest was launched as a project by Davy Hickey Properties, comprising developer Brendan Hickey and clients of Davy Stockbrokers around 1990, working with entrepreneur and landowner Jim Mansfield. The promoters secured land in the rural Kingswood and Brownsbarn areas near the N7 national road and targeted a mixed development, initially comprising a business park and a hotel and golf course complex, which eventually included some on-course accommodation. The concept was later extended, working with Harcourt Developments and Mansfield's HSS venture. Harcourt and HSS provided 55% of the 150 million euro funding for the Luas light line extension to pass through the site. As of 2011, Davy Hickey Properties had secured permission for 150 residential units, along with two shops and more offices, and while HSS had gone into receivership, development of the site continued.

Major companies based at Citywest have included Pfizer, SAP, Unilever, Independent News and Media (the former main printing plant is visible from the N7), and Eir, who moved their headquarters to the campus.

After the hotel and conference centre complex went into receivership, they were subject to various negotiations before being acquired by Tetrarch Capital in 2017. The two golf courses were modified a number of times, but by 2017 were described in a report of Ireland's Competition and Consumer Protection Commission as disused.

== Geography ==
The River Camac flows north of the business campus, and two of its tributaries pass through it.

== Access and transport ==
Following the opening of the original business park, the N82 National road joining the N81 to the Naas dual carriageway was re-routed through the site, having previously passed through the village of Saggart.

Dublin Bus routes 65b, 69, 69x, 77a, 77x, and the S8 and the W6 by Go-Ahead Ireland, as well as feeder services to Tallaght, and a private commuter bus operated by the business campus management, serve the campus.

=== Luas ===
The Luas Line A1 Citywest extension, from Belgard to Saggart, was officially opened at Citywest Drive on 2 July 2011 by the Minister for Transport Leo Varadkar. The following stops were constructed on the line - Fettercairn, Cheeverstown, Citywest Campus, Fortunestown (also serving Citywest Shopping Centre) and Saggart (also serving the Citywest Hotel and its golf course and convention centre). Citywest Campus is the main stop for the business campus, but parts are also served by Cheeverstown and Fortunestown stops. A park-and-ride facility was constructed at the Cheeverstown stop.

== Amenities ==
Citywest Shopping Centre, anchored by Dunnes Stores, also holds a pharmacy, cafes, and other shops. Other retail facilities in the area include a service station.

== Sport ==
A golf complex, previously the Citywest and Hibernian Golf Club, and now simply Citywest Golf Resort, was laid out; the Citywest Hotel, the largest in Ireland, with over 764 rooms, was built adjacent. A 4,000 seat convention centre was also constructed. The hotel, golf resort and related developments were placed in receivership in mid-2010 but remained open. There were two 18-hole courses in the golf resort - both designed by Christy O'Connor Jnr - and it hosted the Irish Masters in 1994 and the Irish Ladies Masters in 1996. Though described as disused in 2017, the resort hosted a golf club in 2019, the licence of which was terminated by notice in 2020, taking effect in March 2021. In October 2020 the owners described both courses as not being financially viable.

The hotel also hosted the World Grand Prix darts tournament from 2000 until 2020, when the hotel was repurposed as an isolation unit during the COVID-19 pandemic.

== Education ==
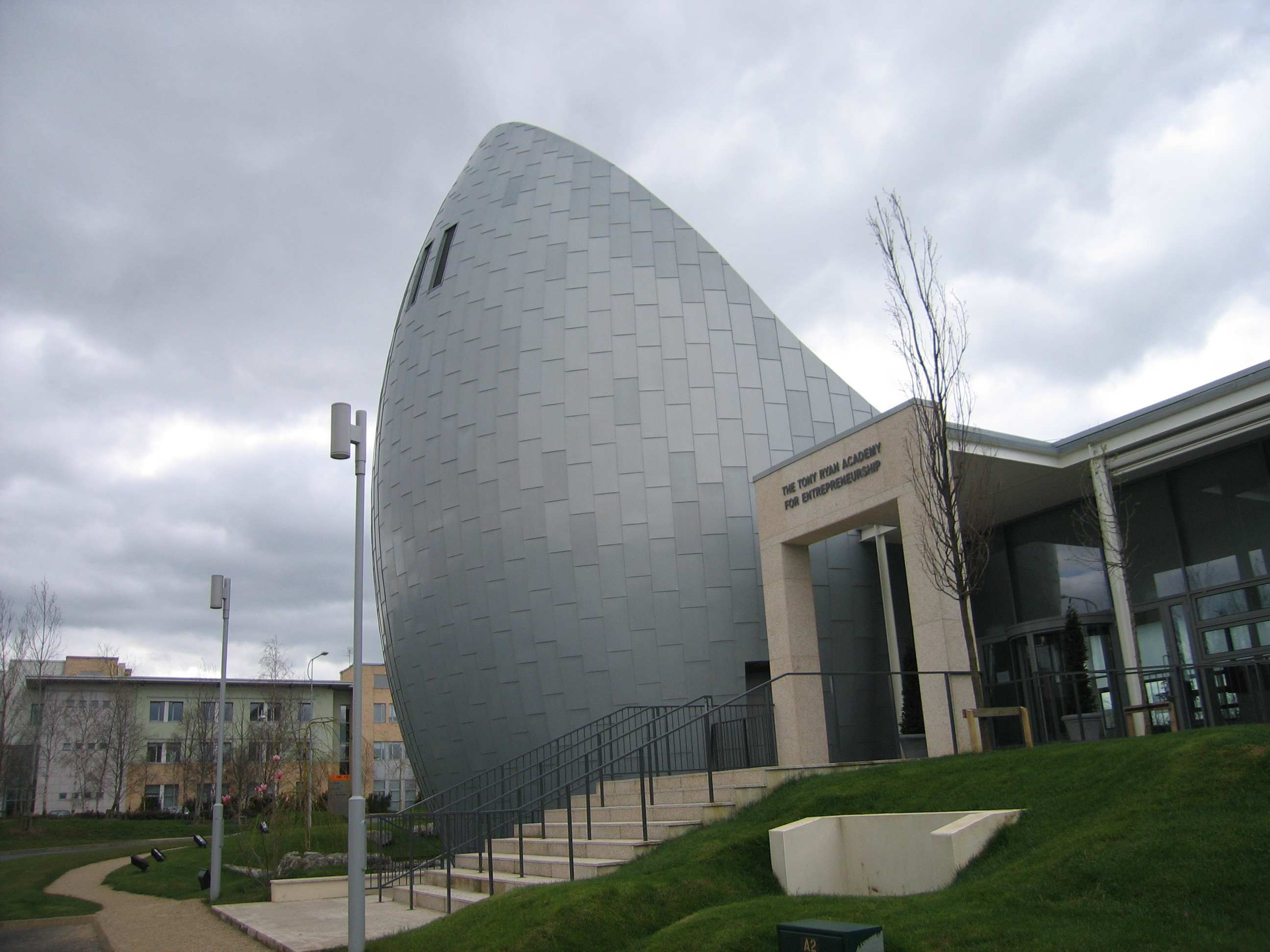
Ryan Academy

Citywest hosts a Dublin City University branch facility, the DCU Ryan Academy (previously part of a larger concept, the Eeolas Institute, which closed after major losses).

Three National Schools, one under the patronage of Educate Together and another under the patronage of the Dublin and Dun Laoghaire Education and Training Board, opened their doors in 2012–2014. As of 2014, Citywest Educate Together National School and Citywest & Saggart Community National School, were established at a temporary location in a building next to the Saggart Red Line Luas stop (Heritage Village Citywest), and in 2014 Scoil Aoife Community National School opened on Citywest Drive.

== Governance ==
Citywest lies within the jurisdiction of South Dublin County Council, near the borders with County Kildare and County Wicklow.
