= R120 road (Ireland) =

Road in Ireland

R120 road
- Bóthar R120

Location
- Country: Ireland

Highway system
- Roads in Ireland; Motorways; Primary; Secondary; Regional

The R120 road is a regional road in south County Dublin, Ireland. It runs from Lucan, Dublin to Rathcoole.

The official description of the R120 from the Roads Act 1993 (Classification of Regional Roads) Order 2012: reads:

R120: Lucan - Rathcoole - Corbally, County Dublin

Between its junction with R835 at Lucan Road in the town of Lucan and its junction with N7 at Rathcoole via Fitzmaurice Road, Adamstown Road and Lock Road in the town of Lucan; Twelfth Lock, Milltown; Peamount Cross, Newcastle; Rathcreedan, College Lane and Fitzmaurice Road all in the county of South Dublin.

== See also ==
- Roads in Ireland
- National primary road
- National secondary road
- Regional road
