= Dartry =

Small suburb of Dublin, Ireland

Dartry Irish: Datraí
- Suburb
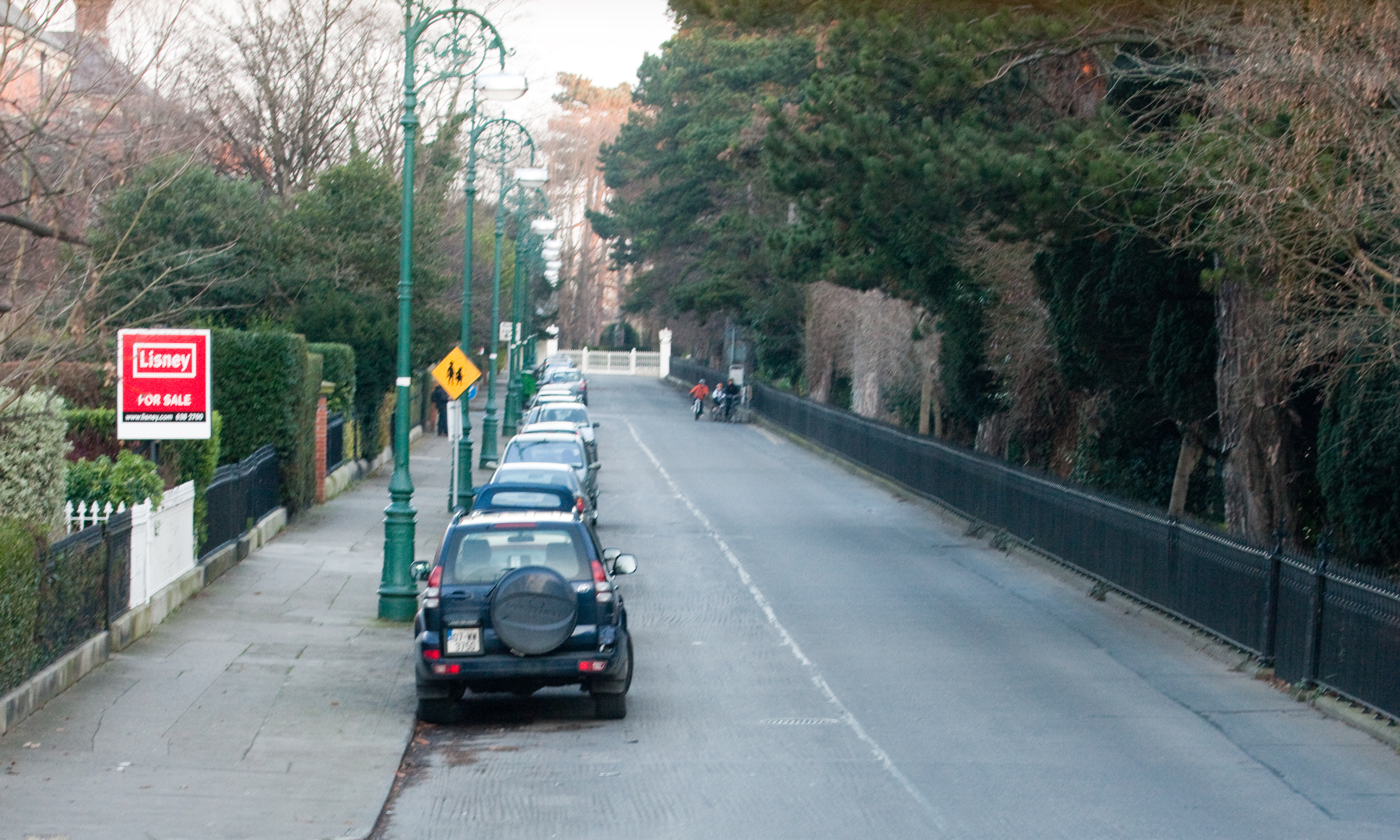
- Palmerston Park, Dartry.

- Location in Ireland
- Coordinates: 53.312°N 6.26°W
- Country: Ireland
- Province: Leinster
- County: County Dublin
- Local authority: Dublin City Council
- Eircode routing key: D06

Dartry (Irish: Dartraí) is a small suburb of Dublin, Ireland, often referred to as a corridor between Rathmines area and Milltown. Among the locations in Dartry are Dartry Road, Temple Road, Orwell Park and Palmerston Park.

== Boundaries ==
Part of Dartry Road is the boundary between the Dáil constituencies of Dublin Bay South and Dublin Rathdown constituencies. This is also the city/county boundary (between the local government areas of the city of Dublin and the county of Dún Laoghaire–Rathdown) and is physically marked by the River Dodder.

== Transport ==
Darty holds the terminus for the 140 bus (beside Palmerston Park).

Dartry was also the terminus for the 12 and 14 Dublin tramways routes. The former terminated outside Palmerston Park and the latter on Dartry Road around Orwell Park. The routes of the old tramways were closed throughout the 1930s to 50s and today the nearest rail link is the Luas stop at Milltown, which is built on the site of the original railway station from the Harcourt Street line. Cowper is also located nearby.

== Locales ==
=== Dartry Road ===
In the part of Dartry Road between Palmerston Park and Temple Road is located Trinity Hall, one of the student residences of Trinity College Dublin. The side gate opening on Dartry Road is the main pedestrian entrance to the Trinity Hall grounds.

Also on the Trinity College grounds at Dartry is the latest (since 1967) home of the centuries-old Trinity College Botanic Garden.

The Dropping Well pub at the riverside is built on the site of a mortuary established to deal with dead bodies carried down the river to the pool underneath the nearby waterfall. It was later a well-known destination for "bona fide" travellers who had to have gone more than 3 miles to be served a drink during the holy hour when Dublin pubs used to shut between 2.30 and 3.30 in the afternoon.

Dartry Road is known as the scene of the killing of IRA member Timothy Coughlin by police informer Sean Harling on the evening of 28 January 1928. It happened opposite Woodpark Lodge, where Harling lived at the time.

Máirtín Ó Cadhain, the Irish author of Cré na Cille, lived at 3 Sunbury Gardens.

== Dartry House ==
Dartry House is a two-storey mansion built about 1810 with several additions made later such as a turret which was incorporated in the building about 1900.

Its original owner was Obadiah Williams, a wealthy merchant of Huguenot origin. Among later owners was William Martin Murphy, who owned The Irish Independent, was involved with the Dublin United Tramways Company (DUTC) and was a central figure in the dispute known as the Dublin lock-out of 1913 where the union side was led by Jim Larkin. The DUTC constructed the tram line from the centre of Dublin to Dartry and Dartry House was built at the original place where the line ended. The terminus of the line and the associated sheds now house an engineering firm.

== Scouting ==
Dartry is home to Dartry Scouts, who have had their den on Sunbury Gardens since the 1970s. The group is the oldest former CBSI scout troop in Ireland and was founded by Father Ernest Farrell in 1927. The group is now secular and mixed.

== Sport ==
The area contains two soccer clubs – the Senior Orwell Dartry and the Junior Dartry Celtic – as well as Brookfield Tennis Club, and Dartry Health Club.

== Notable people ==
- Eddie Jordan, racing driver, motorsport executive, founder and team principal of Jordan in Formula One from 1991 to 2005, broadcaster and businessman, raised in Dartry.
- Stephen Hogan, the actor, was born and raised in Darty.
