= Milltown Luas stop =

Tram stop in Dublin, Ireland

Milltown Baile an Mhuilinn
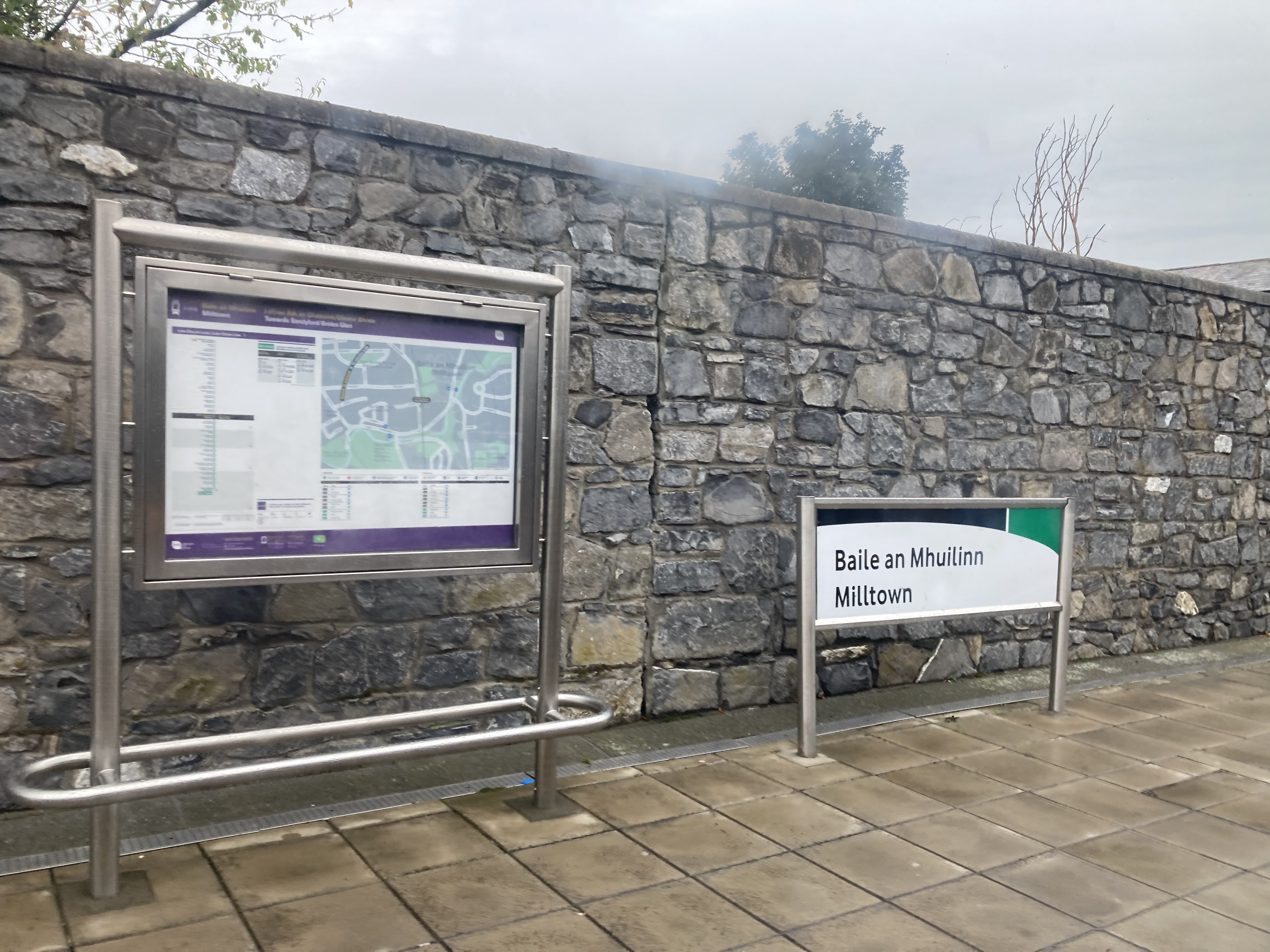
- The sign and map at Milltown

General information
- Location: Richmond Avenue; Milltown, County Dublin; Ireland
- Coordinates: 53°18′35″N 6°15′06″W
- Owner: Transport Infrastructure Ireland
- Operator: Transdev (as Luas)
- Line: Green
- Platforms: 2
- Bus routes: 1
- Bus operators: Go-Ahead Ireland
- Connections: S4

Construction
- Structure type: At-grade

Other information
- Fare zone: Green 2

Key dates
- 1 May 1860: Station opened
- 31 December 1958: Station closed
- 30 June 2004: Luas stop opened
- 2018: Platforms extended
Location
- Location within Dublin

Milltown (Irish: Baile an Mhuilinn) is a stop on the Luas light rail tram system in Dublin, Ireland which serves Milltown, Dublin and southern parts of Dartry, including Trinity Hall. It opened in 2004 as a stop on the Green Line, which re-uses the alignment of the Harcourt Street railway line which closed in 1958. Milltown Luas stop is located a few yards north of the site of the former rail station of the same name.

== History ==
=== Railway station (1860-1958) ===
The Harcourt Street railway line was built by the Dublin, Wicklow and Wexford Railway and opened in 1854, running from a temporary terminus at Harcourt Road near the city centre to Bray. Milltown was added as an infill station in 1860. The station was located on an embankment to the north of Milltown Road. The main station building was located on the up (Dublin-bound) platform. A footbridge allowed passengers to cross the tracks. A signal cabin existed on the down side, but this was closed in 1923 and demolished soon afterwards.

To the south of the station, trains crossed the River Dodder on the Nine Arches Bridge, a stone viaduct built for the line.

=== Closure (1959-2004) ===
The Harcourt Street line had declined in use throughout the early 20th century and was closed by CIÉ at the end of 1958, despite local opposition. The tracks were lifted soon after and all stations on the route were auctioned off. In the years that followed, the buildings and platforms at Milltown were demolished.

=== Luas (2004-present) ===
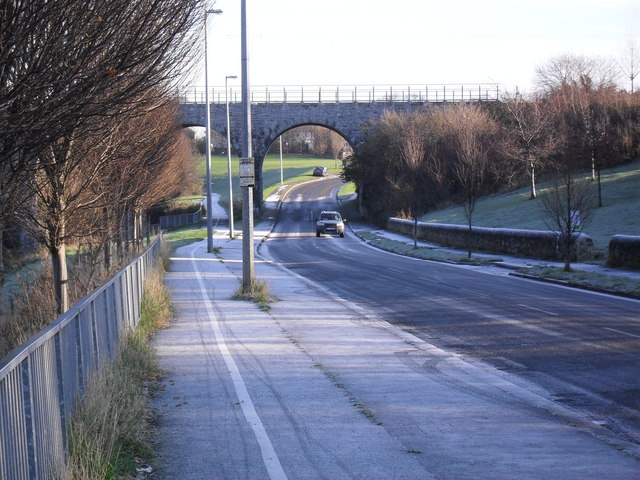
Nine Arches Viaduct, overlooking the village

Construction of the first phase of the Luas system commenced in 2001 and concluded in 2004. The route chosen for the Green Line re-used the old Harcourt Street alignment between Charlemont and Stillorgan. By this stage, little of the old Milltown station remained, but a Luas stop of the same name was built in the same place; The retaining wall at the edge of the southbound platform is the only feature retained from the original station. However, the adjacent viaduct was in good enough condition to be re-used. The viaduct was renovated, hand new track laid on it, and was fitted with parapets and poles to support the catenary wires.

Milltown Luas stop has simple edge platforms with signage, ticket machines, displays and shelters. Directly to the north is a level crossing which provides access to a nearby college. The old station had a level crossing in much the same place.

In 2018, the platforms were lengthened from 45 to 55 metres. This was to accommodate the new longer trams introduced to boost capacity.

=== Service ===
Trams run every 5–10 minutes and terminate at either Parnell or Broombridge in the north, and Sandyford or Brides Glen in the south.

== Onward transport ==
Go-Ahead Ireland operate route S4, which connects the stop with areas such as Rathgar, Terenure, Clonskeagh and Belfield.

Preceding station	Luas	Following station
Cowper towards Parnell or Broombridge	Green Line	Windy Arbour towards Sandyford or Brides Glen
Disused railways
Rathmines & Ranelagh; Line and station closed	Dublin and South Eastern Railway; Harcourt Street line	Dundrum; Line and station closed
