= Palmerston Park, Dublin =

Public park and residential area in Dublin, Ireland

Coordinates: 53°18′47.05″N 6°15′34.33″W

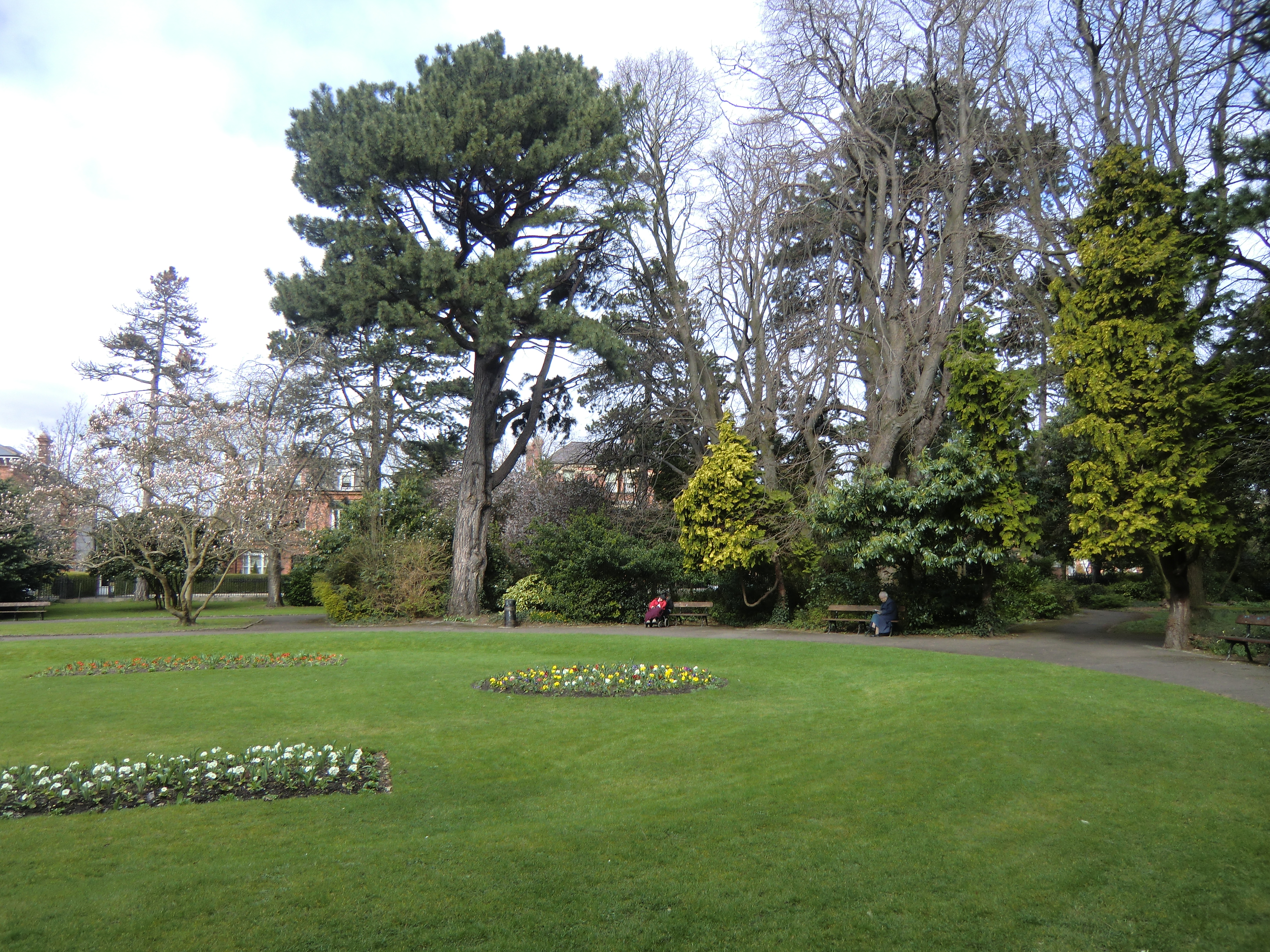
Palmerston Park

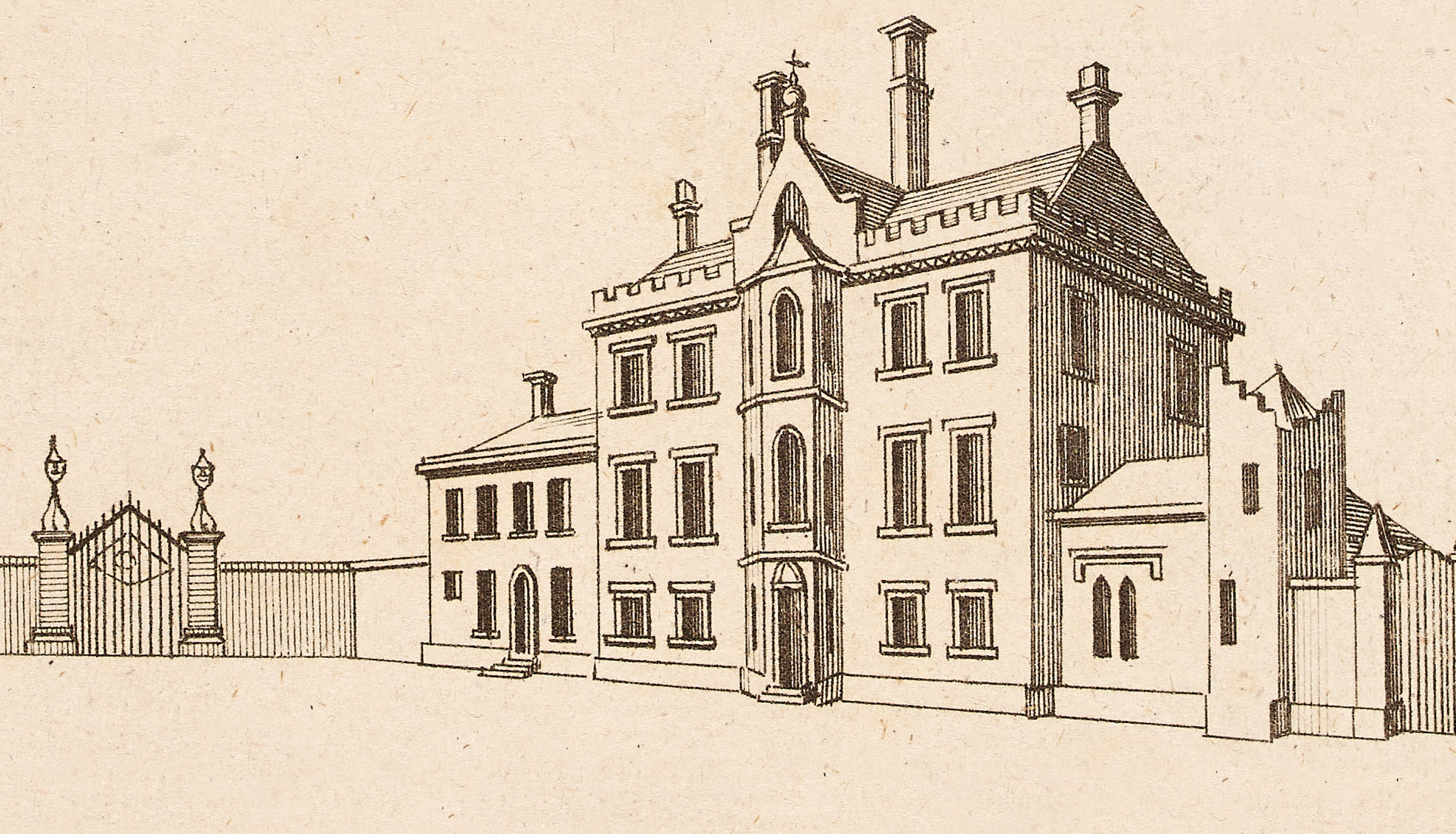
Old Rathmines Castle, Dublin from a 1789 illustration. It was situated adjacent to what today is the site of Palmerston Park.

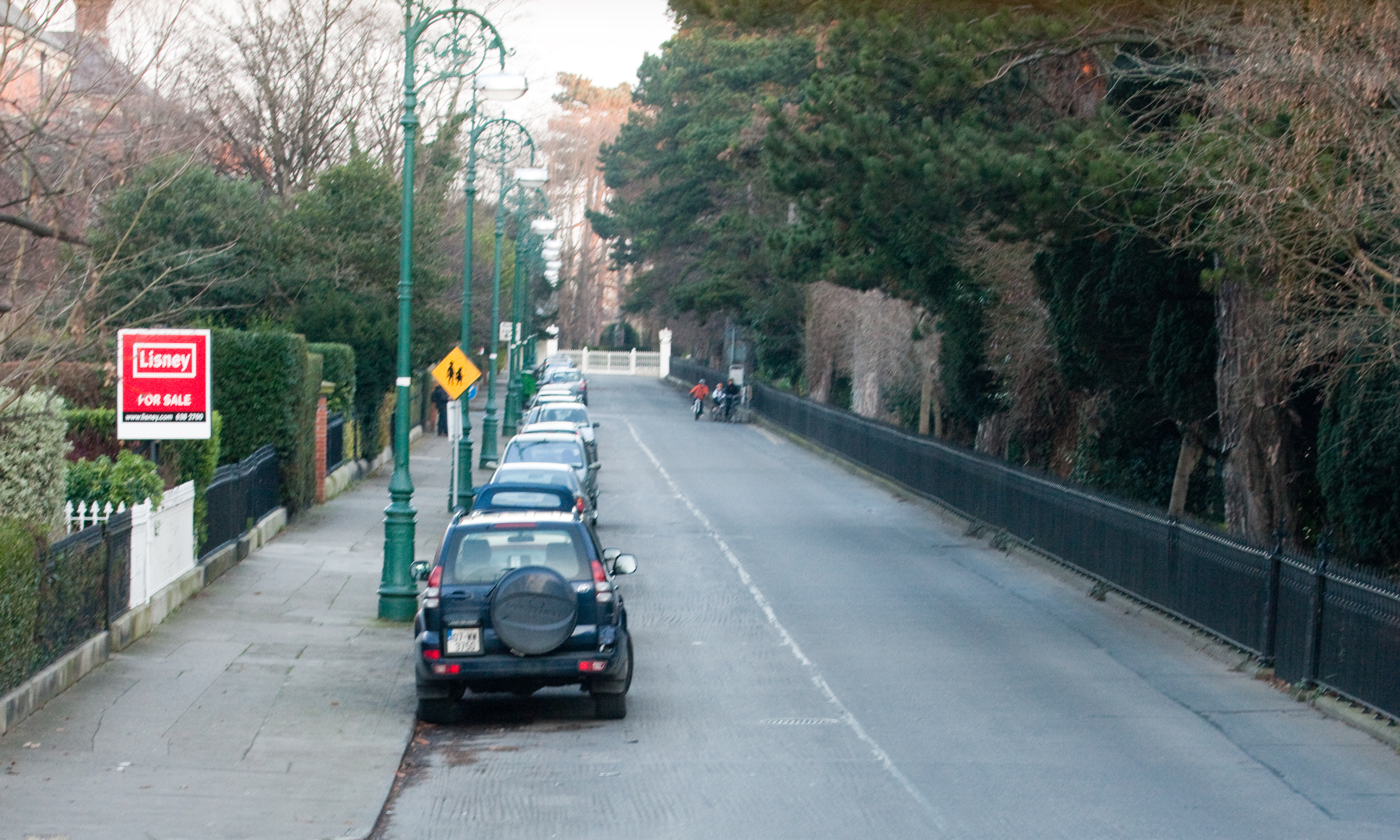
View of street called Palmerston Park

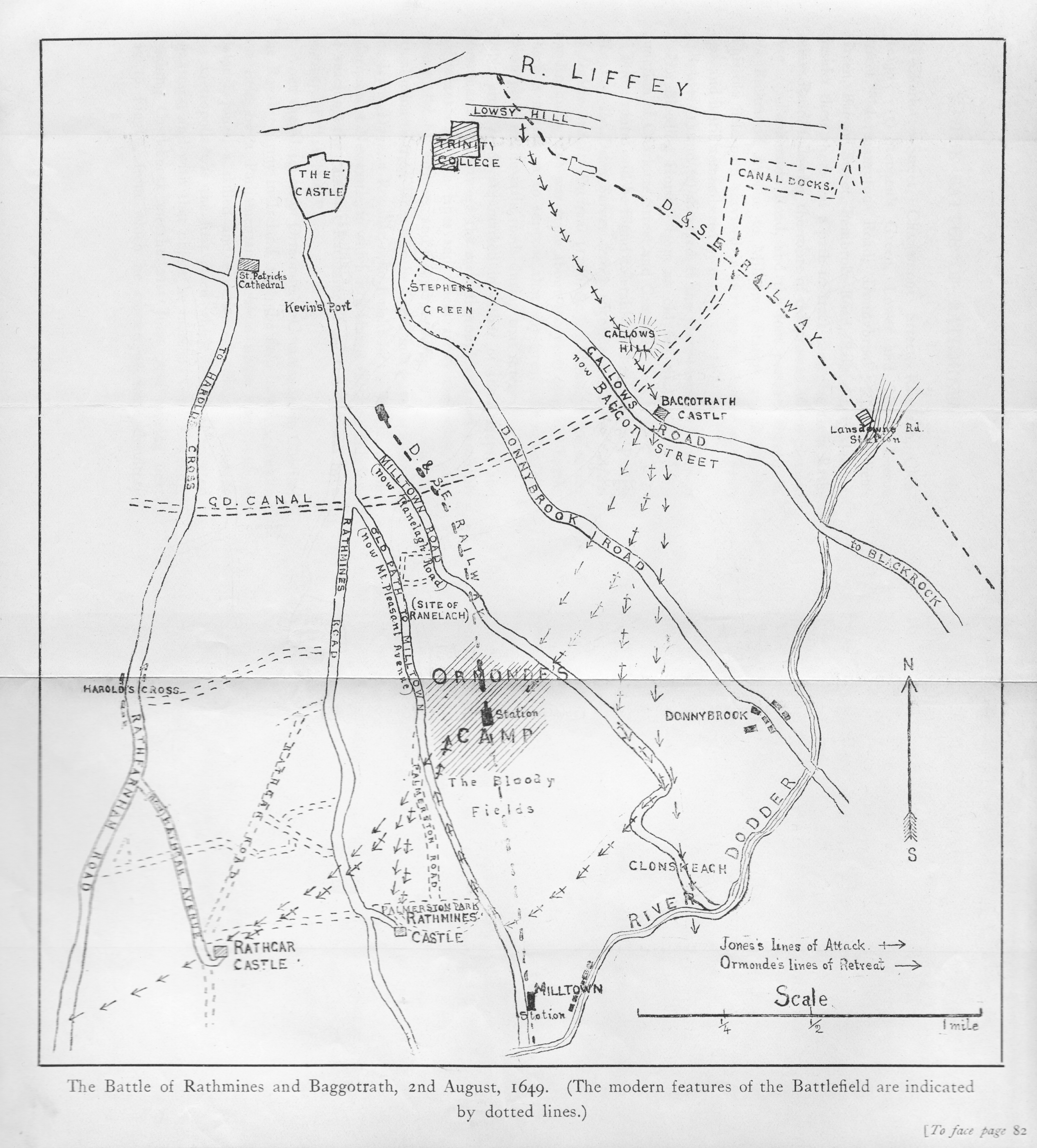
Battle of Rathmines

Palmerston Park (Irish: Páirc Bhaile Phámar) is a public park and residential area in Dartry, a suburb of Dublin, Ireland.

The park is situated at the top of Palmerston Road. It is split into two sections, the east section consisting of open grass areas with a path around leading to a playground, the west section being more enclosed with a pond, flower beds and numerous routes to walk.

The park has opening and closing times that vary throughout the year. These times are displayed on the gates to the park.

== History ==
The park is situated to the North of what was Rathmines Castle which was constructed around 1636 on the site of an earlier tower house at the top of a hill facing the River Dodder. It is likely this was also close to the original Rath which contributed to the Rathmines name.

The castle appears to have been restored by George Radcliffe after it was badly damaged during the Battle of Rathmines and was later occupied by Captain William Shore until his death in 1668.

In 1746, the castle was leased to Sir William Yorke, 1st Baronet by Henry Temple, 1st Viscount Palmerston. The path to Milltown was hence called Yorke's path on some maps from this date.

It housed a boys school by 1789 ran by Reverend Charles Barry and was later demolished around 1840 and replaced with Palmerston Park. A nearby successor school was the later Rathmines School.

A new Rathmines Castle was later built around 1820 at a different location. This castellated house was itself demolished in the mid 1960s to make way for a new Church of Ireland College of Education in Rathmines.
