= River Slang =

Tributary of the Dodder, Dublin, Ireland, also Dundrum River

River Slang (Dundrum River, Dundrum Slang)
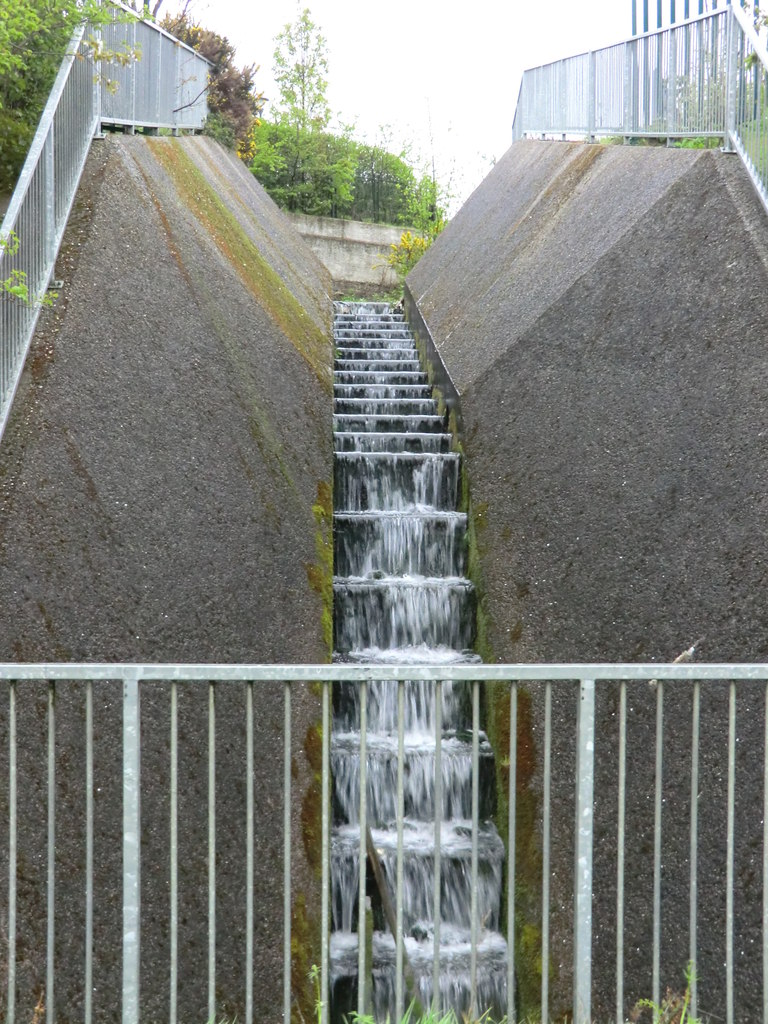
- River Slang approaching the M50

Location
- Country: Ireland
- County: County Dublin

Physical characteristics
- Source
  - location: Three Rock Mountain, near Ticknock
- Mouth
  - location: Confluence with Dodder near Milltown (ultimately Dublin Bay (River Liffey)

Basin features
- River system: River Liffey via River Dodder system
- Tributaries
  - left: Wyckham Stream

The River Slang (Irish: Abhainn na Stéille), also known as the Dundrum Slang or the Dundrum River, a tributary of the River Dodder, is a stream which rises on Three Rock Mountain, County Dublin. It is in the local government area of Dún Laoghaire–Rathdown.

== Course ==
From Three Rock Woods on the northern slopes of Three Rock Mountain, the Slang flows down through Ticknock, eventually cascading down an artificial structure of stone "steps" to an M50 motorway junction. It passes Ballinteer, running north to Dundrum, where it (sometimes known this far as "Ticknock Stream") receives the Wyckham Stream, and then loops east, north, and, with a streamlet joining, west. It comes to the Dundrum Town Centre retail complex, where its main channel runs along one side, while an old millrace feeds a former mill pond now a feature within the shopping facility. The Slang then runs north via Windy Arbour and after a couple of culverted sections, joins the River Dodder at Milltown, near the Nine Arches viaduct, now used by the Luas.

The small Wyckham Stream, joining from the west, is a natural tributary, visible on early maps, but was later connected to the Little Dargle River, further west, to take some of the flow of that river into the Slang, to increase the supply for powering of mills.

== History ==
The Slang was a small stream in a grassy glen behind Dundrum's main street, near the old Dundrum Castle, and children used to play there until late in the 1960s, from when it was confined more and more by modern developments. Its name is from the archaic English term slang, meaning "long, narrow piece of land." Its Irish name is abhainn na Stéille, "river of the strip [of land]".

== Leisure ==
Today there is a walk made by the County Council from south Dundrum to Marlay Park, along part of the Slang, the Wyckham Stream, and part of the Little Dargle.

=== Flooding ===
According to the local authorities and the Office of Public Works, the Slang has a notable record of flooding. In one study, there were more locations of flooding on this small river than on the Dodder or any other of its tributaries. On October 24 2011, after torrential rain on "the Three Rock", the Slang burst its banks at the mill pond below the old castle, flooding the "Town Centre" shopping mall to a depth of at least 15 cm - a 'once in a century' occurrence according to reports, featuring in video reports on YouTube and similar sites and causing extensive damage in multiple shops and food outlets.
