= Trinity Hall, Dublin =

Extramural residence for Trinity College Dublin, Ireland

Trinity Hall
- Halla na Tríonóide
- University of Dublin, Trinity College
- A courtyard of Trinity Hall

- Arms of Trinity College Dublin
- Location: Dartry, Dublin, Ireland
- Coordinates: 53°18′43″N 6°15′41″W
- Nickname: "Halls"
- Established: 16 May 1908
- Named for: The Holy Trinity
- Former names: Glen-na-Smoil
- Architect: Murray Ó Laoire Architects
- Status: Hall of residence
- Gender: Coeducational since 1972
- College: Trinity College Dublin
- University: University of Dublin
- Warden: Dr. Farbod Akhlaghi
- Provost: Linda Doyle
- Residents: >1,000
- Website: www.tcd.ie/accommodation/
- JCR: https://www.trinityhalljcr.com/

Location of Trinity Hall in Dublin City
- Location within Dublin Location within Ireland

Trinity Hall (Irish: Halla na Tríonóide) is the main extramural hall of residence for students of Trinity College in Dublin, Ireland. It is located on Dartry Road in the Dartry neighbourhood, part of the affluent suburb of Rathmines and about 4 kilometres (2.5 mi) south of the College's main campus. Trinity's Botanic Gardens share the site. Trinity Hall is linked to the city centre campus by direct Dublin Bus route and the Luas light rail system via the Milltown Luas stop.

== History ==
=== The first Trinity Hall ===
The first extramural hall established by Trinity College under the name Trinity Hall was located near Hoggen Green (now College Green), on land which had originally been intended for use as a 'bridewell' or house of correction for vagrants. The land, located to the west of Trinity, was sold to the college by Dublin Corporation for the sum of £30 on condition that it be converted for educational use. A Master was appointed, buildings were constructed, and the site was used for teaching and residence by students from 1617 onwards.

However, during the course of the 1641 Rebellion, the site was occupied by poor people from the city. The hall having fallen into decay (which the college at the time could not afford to repair), Trinity discontinued its teaching there, causing the corporation to seek that the site revert to their ownership on the grounds that the agreements for its use were not being upheld. The situation was resolved by John Stearne, a medical doctor and senior fellow at Trinity, who arranged to have the hall repaired without further expense to the college in return for himself being made its president and for the site being redesignated for the sole use of physicians. The daughter college thus founded in 1654 eventually received a royal charter as the Royal College of Physicians of Ireland in 1667, and in the years following Stearne's death it gained virtual independence from Trinity.

=== The modern Trinity Hall ===
The grounds comprising the current Trinity Hall first came under the college's ownership in 1908 when a house named 'Glen-na-Smoil' was purchased in Dartry as a move towards establishing a hall of residence for women. At the time of Trinity Hall's establishment, women had to leave the College campus before 6pm, had to wear 'cap and gown' and could not visit private rooms unless accompanied by a chaperone. Much of the funding came from donations by the Chancellor, Lord Iveagh, and Frederick Purser, a senior fellow, as well as almost all of the fees paid by female Oxford and Cambridge students (the so-called steamboat ladies) for conferral of University of Dublin degrees under the system of ad eundem gradum recognition that exists between the three universities (Oxford and Cambridge not permitting female students to receive degrees for their study at the time). The site was extended in 1910 with the donation of the adjacent Palmerston House and its grounds by John Griffith, who renamed it Purser House in memory of the then-deceased Sarah Purser, a relative of his.

In its early years, under the leadership of the first distinguished warden, Miss E. M. Cunningham, it was run as a strictly female institution providing a sheltered environment for young women students. The hall continued as a residence for females until 1972, when the first men were admitted.

A further five acres were acquired in 1966 when the Dublin University Botanic Garden was transferred to part of the grounds of Trinity Hall.

By the 21st century, there was a focus on housing first year undergraduates, with a smaller number of places set aside for second year students and postgraduates. In 2004 a €95 million project to hugely increase the number of bedspaces at Trinity Hall opened to students. This allowed Trinity Hall to accommodate over 1,000 students, rather than the 180 it had up until then.

As of 2024, the College has received permission from An Bord Pleanála for a major new development which is scheduled to add over 300 new spaces for students amidst Ireland's ongoing housing crisis.

== Facilities and Grounds ==
=== Residential Areas ===
The modern residence comprises 12 separate houses (numbered 80 – 91, continuing the numbering system used on the Trinity College campus), in three blocks, each house featuring 10 to 20 apartments. These units are arranged in a combination of twin, single, and staff rooms, with disabled accessible rooms distributed throughout the site. Most accommodate five to seven people, with some single apartments for staff. Each apartment contains common living, dining and kitchen areas.

The apartments are grouped into independent, contained houses, gathered to form open-ended courtyards and landscaped parks.

The older house, Cunningham House (House 79), is no longer in use; it contained older single study bedrooms, where each apartment accommodated 14 people. Built in the 1970s, it is scheduled for demolition in order to build additional modern units.

Support facilities necessary to the basic maintenance and operation of the institution include a laundrette, linen stores, workshops, reception areas, associated stores, offices and a student shop. They are centrally located and operate specifically to serve the on-site community.

=== Amenities & Recreational Facilities ===
Three older Georgian houses located on site, Oldham House, Greenane House, and Purser House, are protected structures, which are preserved for their historic and cultural significance. Oldham House may be used by students as a social space, and also contains a library, a computer rooms, as well as the Warden's Office.

A 24 hour reception and security facilities are available in the site. The sports facilities on site are located in the McConnell Sports Hall which includes a squash court, table tennis, badminton, indoor football, games area for pool and snooker, on-site shop, and games consoles. The new buildings also house a canteen capable of seating 400 diners with associated kitchens and an atrium to rear.

Entertainment facilities include a TV room and a sound proof music room. All bedrooms have wireless internet connections and the kitchens have a cable TV connection.

== Management and Operations ==
=== Warden of Trinity Hall ===
The Warden of Trinity Hall is an academic appointed by the Provost to oversee the complex on behalf of Trinity College. The Warden carries out two main functions on behalf of College. The Warden is primarily responsible for enquiring into any alleged breach of discipline by a student in Trinity Hall and for taking further action in accordance with the College Statutes. For minor offences, this may result in a fine being imposed upon a student. The second function is to allocate residential rooms in Hall to students. The power to allocate rooms resides with the Provost but for Trinity Hall, this is delegated to the Warden. Applications for rooms are normally invited in the spring and the application form is available on the web.

The Warden typically lives, with their family, in Purser House on the Trinity Hall site. As of September 2026, the office of Warden is currently held by Dr. Farbod Akhlaghi.

==== List of Wardens of Trinity Hall ====
The following people have occupied the role of Warden.

- 1908 – 1940: E. Margaret Cunningham
- 1940 – 1947: Dorothea Waller
- 1947 – 1949: Joyce Power-Steele
- 1949 – 1957: Clarissa Pilkington (née Crawford)
- 1957 – 1965: Anne Denard (née Brambell)
- 1965 – 1974: Lelia McCutcheon
- 1974 – 1989: Fred Aalen
- 1989 – 1996: Petros Serghiou Florides
- 1996 – 2000: Paddy Nixon
- 2000 – 2005: Carmel O'Sullivan
- 2005 – 2017: Brendan Tangney
- 2017 – 2023: Roja Fazaeli
- 2023 – 2026: Nigel Stevenson
- 2026 – present: Farbod Akhlaghi

==== Senior Common Room ====
The Senior Common Room (SCR) of Trinity Hall consists of the Warden, Deputy Warden, and Assistant Wardens. Assistant Wardens act as first point of contact for residents who need advice on any aspect of living in Trinity Hall or adjusting to life in Trinity. Assistant Wardens are available to discuss any problems that may arise, be they personal or academic. Assistant Wardens are responsible for the maintenance of good order within Trinity Hall, and for ensuring that the behaviour of students is in accordance with the ethos of Trinity Hall. When requested to do so, residents must follow instructions of Assistant Wardens, provide identification if requested, and desist from anti-social behaviour if asked to do so.

=== Accommodation Office ===
The Accommodation Office is tasked with day-to-day operation of the complex. The administrative offices are housed above the main reception area in the red bricked building with a large glass atrium in front of House 81. This are also houses the Residential Services Attendants/Security Desk which is staffed 24 hours per day. Staff of the Accommodation Office are responsible for all matters relating to occupancy of a room and licence to reside, resident’s accounts, early departures as well as the physical property itself and maintenance.

=== Allocation of Rooms ===
Trinity Hall is the designated hall of residence for new Trinity College students entering their first year of their undergraduate studies. A small number of undergraduates in all years and visiting students will also be considered for accommodation at Trinity Hall. Recipients of the Foundation Scholarship are also housed in Trinity Hall during their first year. Provisional room allocations to EU students are made in advance of CAO offers and are confirmed after a student is admitted to the University. Admission to Trinity Hall is at the discretion of the Warden, and is typically awarded via lottery.

Priority is granted to children of Fellows of Trinity College coming to Trinity for undergraduate studies, who also receive discounted housing.

==== Irish Language Residency Scheme (Scéim Cónaithe) ====
Speakers of the Irish language may apply for accommodation in a scheme operated by the College's Irish Language Office which seeks to promote the Irish language in university life by offering Irish language accommodation to student speakers. The Residency Scheme is open to students from across Ireland and abroad who are fluent in Irish and wish to speak the language on a daily basis. Successful candidates also receive a grant of €1,000 from the College over the course of the academic year.

== JCR ==
Trinity Hall is home to a Junior Common Room (JCR), an elected body of second-year students who organise social events, pursue the interests of the students, and care for student welfare.

== See also ==
- Buildings and structures of Trinity College Dublin
- Dartry
- Isabel Marion Weir Johnston, the first woman to enter Trinity.
- List of Trinity College Dublin student organisations
- Steamboat ladies
- Trinity College Dublin
- Women's college
