= Windy Arbour =

Small suburban area within Dundrum, Dublin, Ireland

Windy Arbour Na Glasáin (Irish)
- Suburb
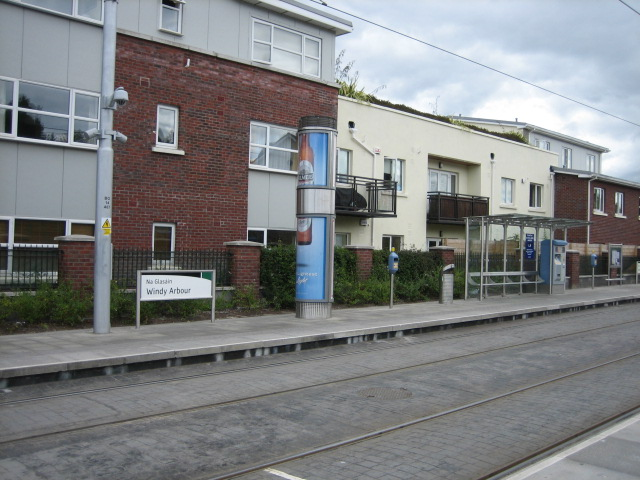
- Windy Arbour Luas stop

- Location in Dublin Windy Arbour (Ireland)
- Coordinates: 53°18′N 6°15′W
- Country: Ireland
- Province: Leinster
- County: County Dublin
- Time zone: UTC±0 (WET)
  - Summer (DST): UTC+1 (IST)
- Eircode routing key: D14
- Telephone area code: +353(0)1

Windy Arbour (Irish: Na Glasáin), historically called Glassons, is a small suburban village in the Dundrum area of Dublin, Ireland. Situated between Dundrum and Milltown, along the banks of the Slang River (also Dundrum or Slann River).

== History ==
The name of the area was originally Irish Na Glasáin, "the green land"; this was anglicised as 'Glassons'. The name Windy Harbour or Sandy Arbour was later applied, referring to a landing-point on the River Slang. A starch mill was formerly located there. "Arbour" once had the meaning "grass plot, lawn, garden"; it is possible that the name was intended as a direct translation of glasáin.

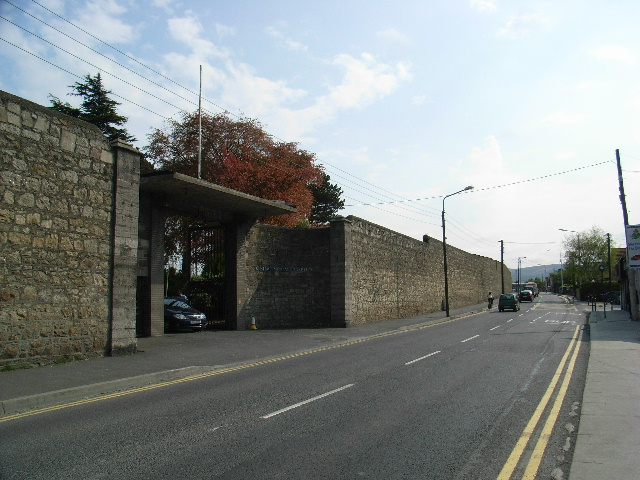
Entrance to the Central Mental Hospital in Windy Arbour (built c.1850)

Perhaps the most famous person to live in Windy Arbour was Irish patriot Robert Emmet, who grew up in The Casino, a manor house that is now known as Emmet House, where the Secretariat of Secondary schools in Ireland is currently housed. It is located next to the Church of the Miraculous Medal on Bird Avenue and was formerly known as Carton House.

The Central Mental Hospital is located beside the village and was built c.1850. The hospital provides treatment in high, low, and medium-security conditions. Patients are referred by the courts, the prisons and local hospitals for both assessment and residential treatment.

== Amenities ==
Windy Arbour has a number of shops, a supermarket, post office, pharmacy and a bakery. It is also home to several takeaways and restaurants. There is a primary school in Columbanus Estate known as Our Lady's National School, Clonskeagh. The area is served by Windy Arbour Luas stop and by the number 17, 44 and 61 bus routes.

== Housing ==
Windy Arbour is surrounded by several housing estates, including Columbanus. At the centre of Windy Arbour is the smaller and much older townland of Farranboley, which appears on maps dating from the 18th century.

== Political geography ==
Windy Arbour is in the Dáil constituency of Dublin Rathdown. It is in the county of Dún Laoghaire–Rathdown and is in the local electoral area of Dundrum for elections to Dún Laoghaire–Rathdown County Council.

== See also ==
- List of towns and villages in Ireland
