= Nine Arches Bridge =

Bridge over the River Dodder in Ireland

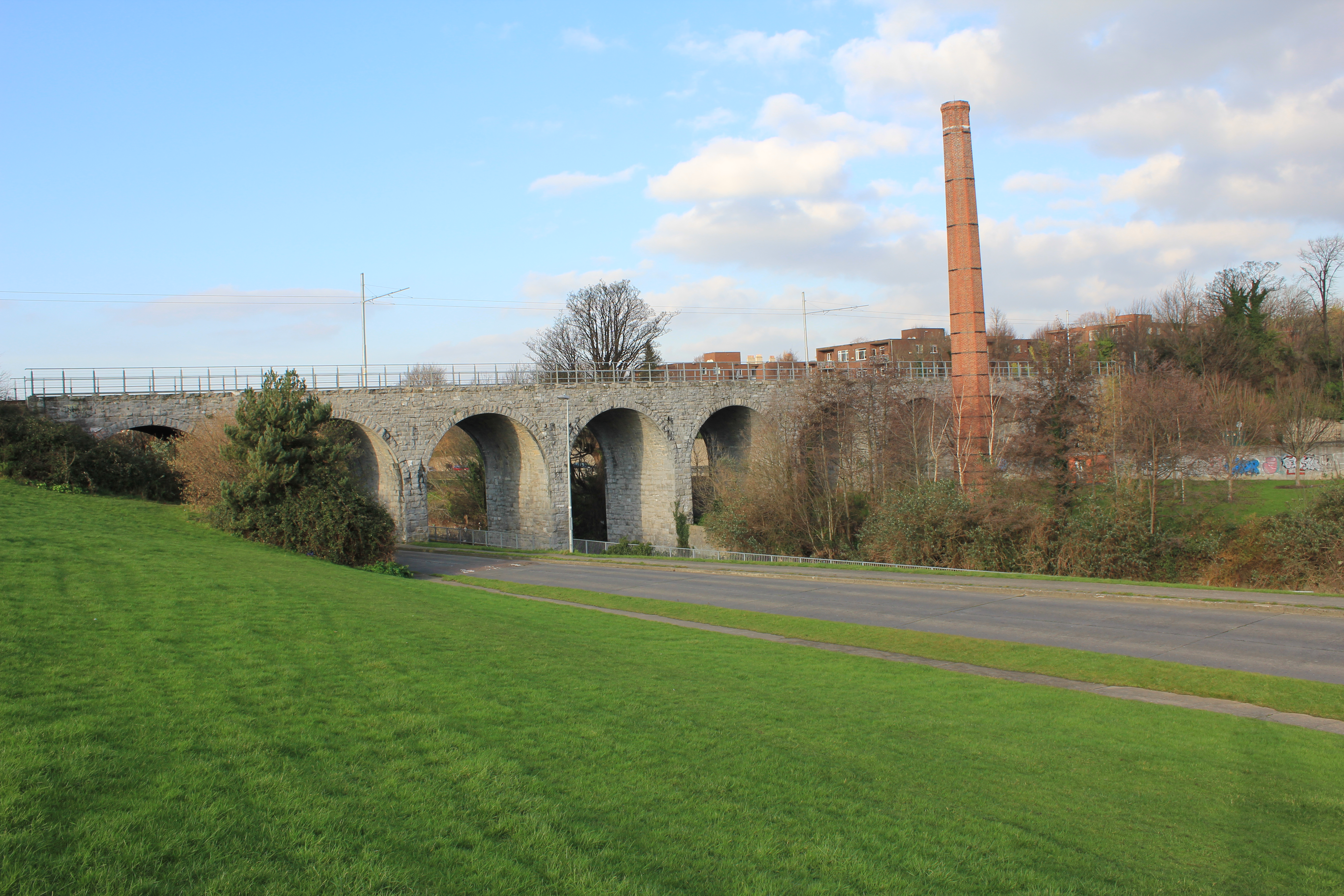
- Nine Arches Bridge in March 2015
- Coordinates: 53.308099°N 6.251221°W
- Carries: Luas Green Line
- Crosses: River Dodder
- Locale: Milltown, Ireland
- Official name: Milltown Viaduct
- Maintained by: Transport Infrastructure Ireland

Characteristics
- Material: Granite
- No. of spans: 9

Rail characteristics
- No. of tracks: Double track
- Track gauge: 1,435mm

History
- Construction end: 1854 (Closed in 1958 and reopened in 2004)
- Opened: 10 July 1854

Location
- Interactive map of Nine Arches Bridge

The Nine Arches Bridge is a viaduct over the River Dodder in Milltown, Dublin, Ireland. The Luas tram Green Line crosses the bridge. There is no access for pedestrians. The bridge is included on the Record of Protected Structures maintained by Dublin City Council.

== History ==
The bridge was completed in 1854 for the Harcourt Street railway line. The line was closed on 31 December 1958 and the bridge was left derelict for over 40 years until construction began on Luas tram line. Handrails were fitted to the side of the bridge and overhead power lines were added for the trams. The bridge was first used in testing in February 2004 and officially reopened on 30 June 2004.

== Gallery ==
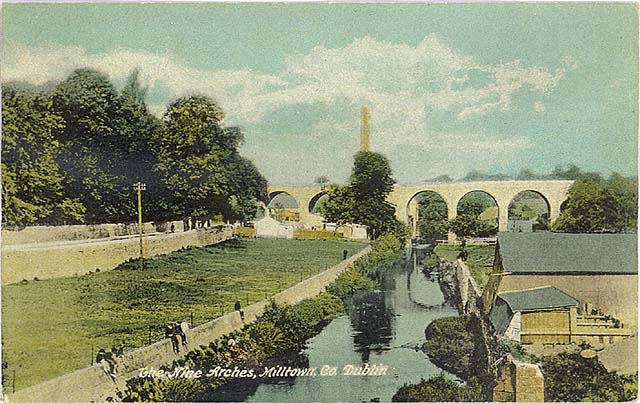
Photo taken in 1909, in postcard format.

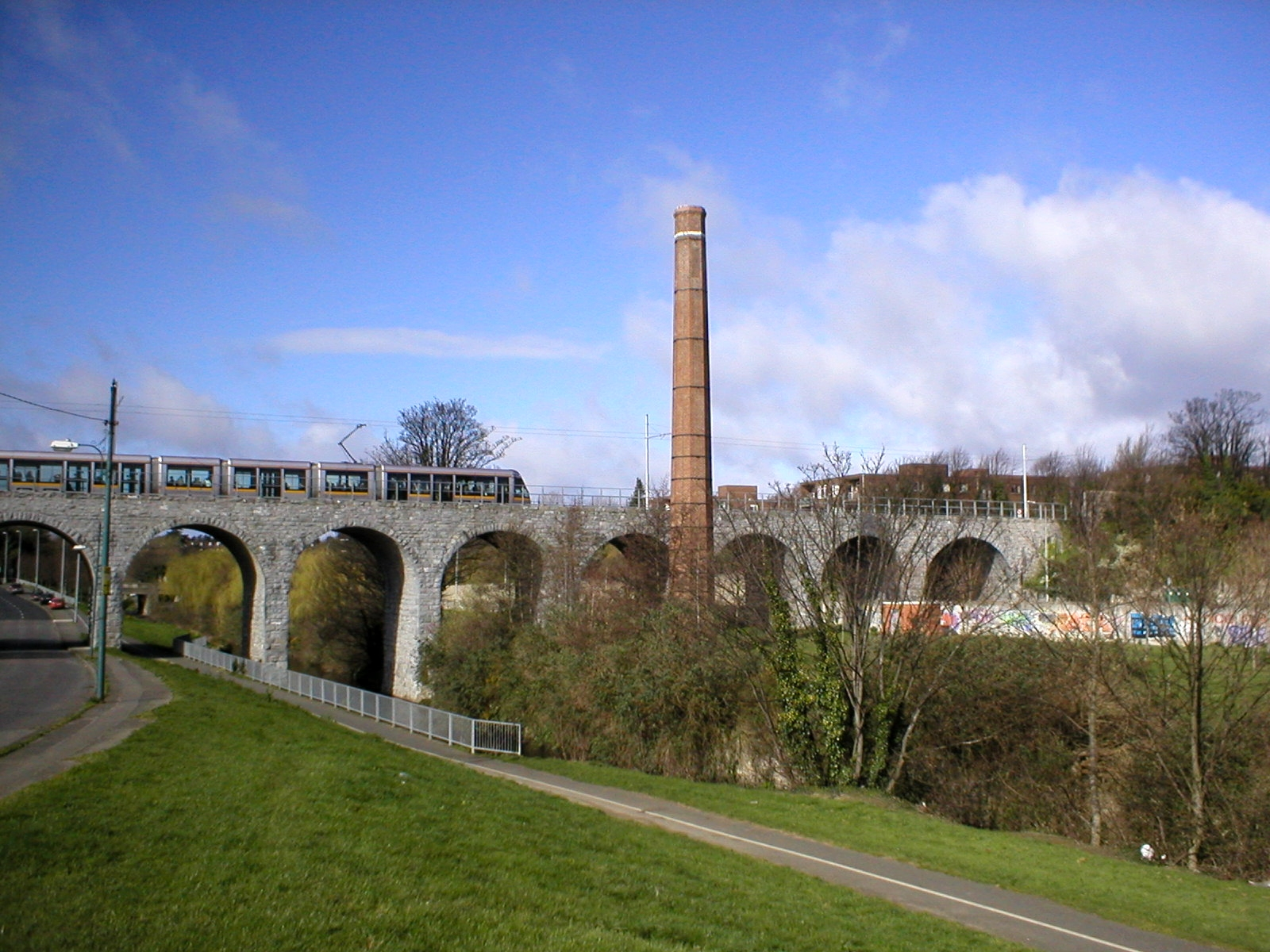
Tram crossing
