= Beechwood Luas stop =

Tram/light rail stop in Dublin, Ireland

Beechwood Coill na Feá
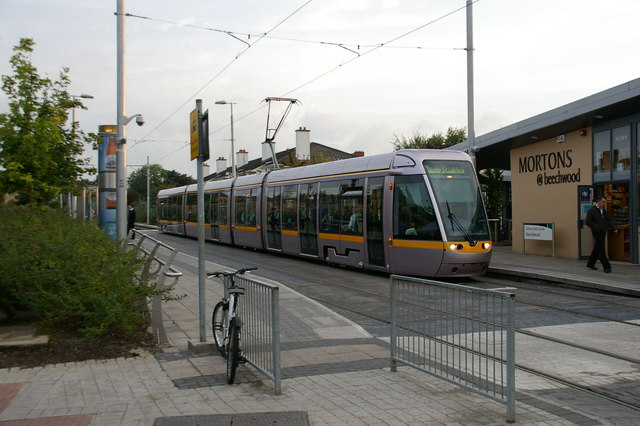
- A tram at Beechwood

General information
- Other names: Ranelagh (as a railway station)
- Location: Dunville Avenue/Beechwood Road; Ranelagh/Rathmines, Dublin; Ireland
- Coordinates: 53°19′15″N 6°15′17″W
- Owner: Transport Infrastructure Ireland
- Operator: Transdev (as Luas)
- Line: Green
- Platforms: 2

Construction
- Structure type: Elevated (railway station); At-grade (tram stop)

Other information
- Fare zone: Green 2

History
- Original company: Dublin, Wicklow and Wexford Railway
- Pre-grouping: Dublin and South Eastern Railway
- Post-grouping: Great Southern Railways

Key dates
- 16 July 1896: Station opened (as Rathmines and Ranelagh)
- 31 December 1958: Station closed
- 30 June 2004: Luas stop opened (as Beechwood)
- 2018: Platforms extended
Location
- Location within Dublin

Beechwood (Irish: Coill na Feá) is a stop on the Luas light rail tram system in Dublin, Ireland which serves the southern parts of Ranelagh and Rathmines. It opened in 2004 as a stop on the Green Line, which re-uses the alignment of the Harcourt Street railway line which closed in 1958. Beechwood Luas stop is located on the same site as a station on the old line called Rathmines and Ranelagh, although it is lower than the original station.

== History ==
=== Railway station (1896-1958) ===
The Harcourt Street railway line was built by the Dublin, Wicklow and Wexford Railway and opened in 1854, running from a temporary terminus at Harcourt Road near the city centre to Bray. Rathmines and Ranelagh was added as an infill station in 1896 due to the rising growth of the Dublin tramways in the area. The station was located on an embankment to the south of Dunville Avenue. There were station buildings on both platforms, which were accessed via a subway under the tracks with white tiles lining the walls, similar to the one at Lansdowne Road.

The station's official name was Rathmines & Ranelagh, although it was always referred to as simply Ranelagh by the public and staff.

The station originally had had all timber platforms, but they were replaced with concrete in 1943.

=== Closure (1959-2004) ===
The Harcourt Street line had declined in use throughout the early 20th century and was closed by CIÉ at the end of 1958, despite local opposition. The tracks were lifted soon after and all stations on the route were auctioned off. In the years that followed, the buildings and platforms at Ranelagh were demolished.

=== Luas (2004-present) ===
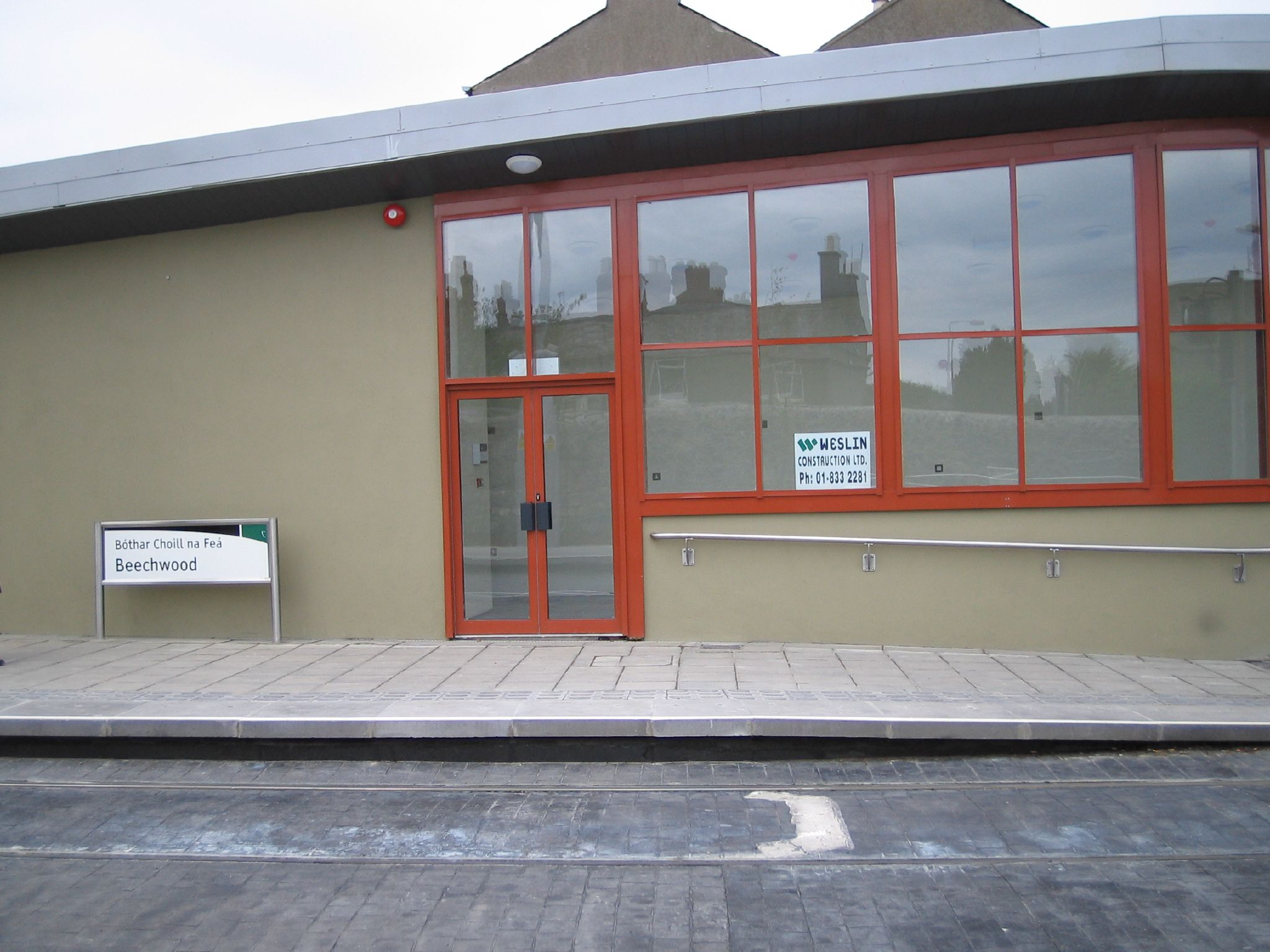
The northbound platform in 2004, before the retail unit had been let

Construction of the first phase of the Luas system commenced in 2001 and concluded in 2004. The route chosen for the Green Line re-used the old Harcourt Street alignment between Charlemont and Stillorgan. The stop which was built on the site of the old Ranelagh station is called Beechwood (a separate stop for Ranelagh was built around 500m up the line). During the construction of the Luas line, the level of the track bed was lowered by several metres and the remains of the subway were demolished. The Luas line now crosses Dunville Avenue at-grade.

The stop was built with two side platforms, which have the furniture common to all Luas stops. The only entrance is from Dunville Avenue. In the place of a former ticket office, a small building was built and used as a retail unit. Currently used as a coffee shop, it opens directly onto the northbound platform and most of its trade comes from passengers awaiting their tram.

In 2018, the platforms were lengthened from 45 to 55 metres. This was to accommodate the new longer trams introduced to boost capacity.

== Future ==
When plans for the MetroLink were published, it was envisaged that the new line would subsume the existing Green Line from Charlemont to Sandyford. Transport Infrastructure Ireland planned to close all level crossings on the line. To this end, the plan was to close road access across Dunville Avenue and replace it with a footbridge. The plan met with opposition from local businesses including the owner of the coffee shop, who argued that road closure would stifle local communication and economy. Plans to upgrade the Green Line to Metro standards have since been postponed.

== Service ==
Trams run every 5–10 minutes and terminate at either Parnell or Broombridge in the north, and Sandyford or Brides Glen in the south. The stop is also close to the following routes operated by Dublin Bus 11, 44, and S2. The 61 also formerly operated nearby until 26 November 2023 when the S2 replaced it as part of BusConnects.

Preceding station	Luas	Following station
Ranelagh towards Parnell or Broombridge	Green Line	Cowper towards Sandyford or Brides Glen
Disused railways
Harcourt Street; Line and station closed	Dublin and South Eastern Railway; Harcourt Street line	Milltown; Line and station closed
