= Christopher Moriarty =

Irish naturalist and author (1936–2024)

- Born: 1936; Dublin, Ireland
- Died: 13 January 2024 (aged 87–88); Dublin, Ireland
- Occupations: Naturalist, non-fiction writer
- Known for: Studies of eels
- Board member of: Clerk of the Meeting, Dublin Quakers
- Spouse: Sue Goldie-Moriarty
- Children: 2

Academic background
- Education: St Columba's College
- Alma mater: Trinity College Dublin
- Thesis: The growth and nutrition of fish in Ireland with particular reference to the eel Anguilla Anguilla (L.) (1972)

Academic work
- Discipline: Natural history
- Sub-discipline: Ichthyology, eels
- Institutions: Department of Fisheries, Marine Institute (Ireland)
- Main interests: Fisheries, fish farms, eels, Rivers Liffey and Dodder

Christopher Moriarty (1936 – 13 January 2024) was an Irish naturalist and author. An ichthyologist working in the areas of inland fisheries and river management, he became an authority on the European eel. He was the author of papers and books on eels, and books on Irish nature in general, and rivers, as well as travel within Ireland.

== Early life and education ==
Christopher Moriarty was born in Dublin in 1936; his father, from Omagh, was the son of a Church of Ireland rector. He grew up in Rathfarnham, attending a private primary school, Castle Park, and then boarding at St Columba's College. His family moved to Ballyboden when he was 19. He pursued undergraduate studies in Natural Science at Trinity College Dublin, with lecturers including David Webb and Frank Mitchell.

== Career ==
Moriarty began a career in freelance writing while still at college. He was preparing to take a regular job at a school in England when he found an opportunity in Ireland's Department of Agriculture and Fisheries, in a studentship to observe the fish in the newly-formed Poulaphouca Reservoir near Blessington. He subsequently secured a permanent post, and worked in the public sector for over 40 years. While attached to the Fisheries Service (modern-day Inland Fisheries Ireland), he was awarded an MSc at Trinity College Dublin, with a dissertation entitled "The Ecology of Irish Fresh Waters, Being a Study of Biology of Brown Trout (Salmo trutta) and Perch (Perca fluviatilis) in the Poulaphouca reservoir, Ireland." In 1972, he received a Ph.D from Trinity College, with a thesis entitled "The Growth and Nutrition of Fish in Ireland with Particular Reference to the Eel Anguilla Anguilla (L.)". He gave the Went Memorial Lecture at the Royal Dublin Society in 1987, on The Eel in Ireland.

== Writing ==
Moriarty published a range of articles in newspapers including the Evening Press and later the Irish Times. His first book, A Guide to Irish Birds, was released in 1967, followed by A Natural History of Ireland in 1971. Eels: A Natural and Unnatural History was published in 1978. Two books of cycling routes followed in 1980, with a collection of driving route articles from Ireland of the Welcomes in 1994. He was the main author of text of The Book of the Liffey in 1988, and author of Down the Dodder, described as the most detailed guide to the main River Dodder line, in 1998, and also published a book on Dublin's parks and waterways. In 2018, he published an illustrated volume, The River Liffey: History and Heritage.

== International and Irish voluntary roles ==
Moriarty served as chairperson of the European Inland Fisheries Advisory Commission for three years. He was a member of the scientific committee of the Royal Dublin Society for many years.

== Personal life and death ==
Moriarty married Sue Goldie, a medical historian specialising in studies of Florence Nightingale; they had two boys. Sue Goldie-Moriarty died in 2012. Moriarty died at Blackrock Clinic on 13 January 2024, and was buried in the Quaker cemetery in Blackrock.

=== Society of Friends ===
Moriarty moved from the Church of Ireland to the Society of Friends in the 1970s. He served a three-year term as Clerk of the Dublin Meeting, including representing the Quakers at the funeral of Jack Lynch, and was for many years the clerk of the historical committee of the Quakers in Ireland and curator of the Quaker Historical Library in Ireland.

== Publications ==
Some of Moriarty's publications include the below, along with several volumes in the Folens "Irish Environment" series for schools and young people:

- A Guide to Irish Birds, Christopher Moriarty, 1967
- A Natural History of Ireland, Christopher Moriarty, 1971, SBN 85342 231 1
- Irish Wheel Guides 1: Dublin & North Wicklow, Christopher Moriarty, 1980, SBN 7171 1027 3
- Irish Wheel Guides 2: Ireland North West, Christopher Moriarty, 1980, ISBN 071711032-X
- The Book of the Liffey from Source to the Sea, Elizabeth Healy (ed.); Christopher Moriarty and Gerard O'Flaherty (chapter authors), 1988, ISBN 086327167-7
- By-ways Rather Than Highways, Christopher Moriarty, 1994, ISBN 086327373-4
- Down the Dodder, Christopher Moriarty, 1998, ISBN 086327286-X
- Exploring Dublin: Wildlife, Parks, Waterways, Christopher Moriarty, 1998, ISBN 086327590-7
- The River Liffey: History and Heritage, Christopher Moriarty, 2018, ISBN 184889354-X

Aside from his dissertation and thesis, papers authored and / or edited include:

Ichthyology - peer-reviewed academic papers:

- Is there a role of ocean environment in American and European eel decline? in Fisheries Oceanography, vol. 3, issue 3, Sept. 1994
- European catches of elver of 1928-1988 in Internationale Revue der gesamten Hydrobiologie und Hydrographie, vol. 75, issue 6
- Age determination and growth rate of eels, Anguilla anguilla in Journal of Fish Biology, vol. 23, issue 3, Sept. 1983
- Observations on the Silver Eel Migrations of the Burrishoole River System, Ireland, 1959 to 1988 in Observations on the Silver Eel Migrations of the Burrishoole River System, Ireland, 1959 to 1988, vol. 75, issue 6, January 1990

Ichthyology - other professional papers:

- Management of the European Eel, Moriarty and Dekker (eds), (Second report of EC Concerted Action AIR A94-1939 - Enhancement of the European eel fishery and conservation of the species), Dublin, 1997; 110 pp.

Quaker history - peer-reviewed:

- John Watson and the Quaker Meeting House at Kilconner, County Carlow, Ireland.
