= Milltown, Dublin =

Suburb of Dublin, Ireland

Milltown Baile an Mhuilinn (Irish)
- Suburb
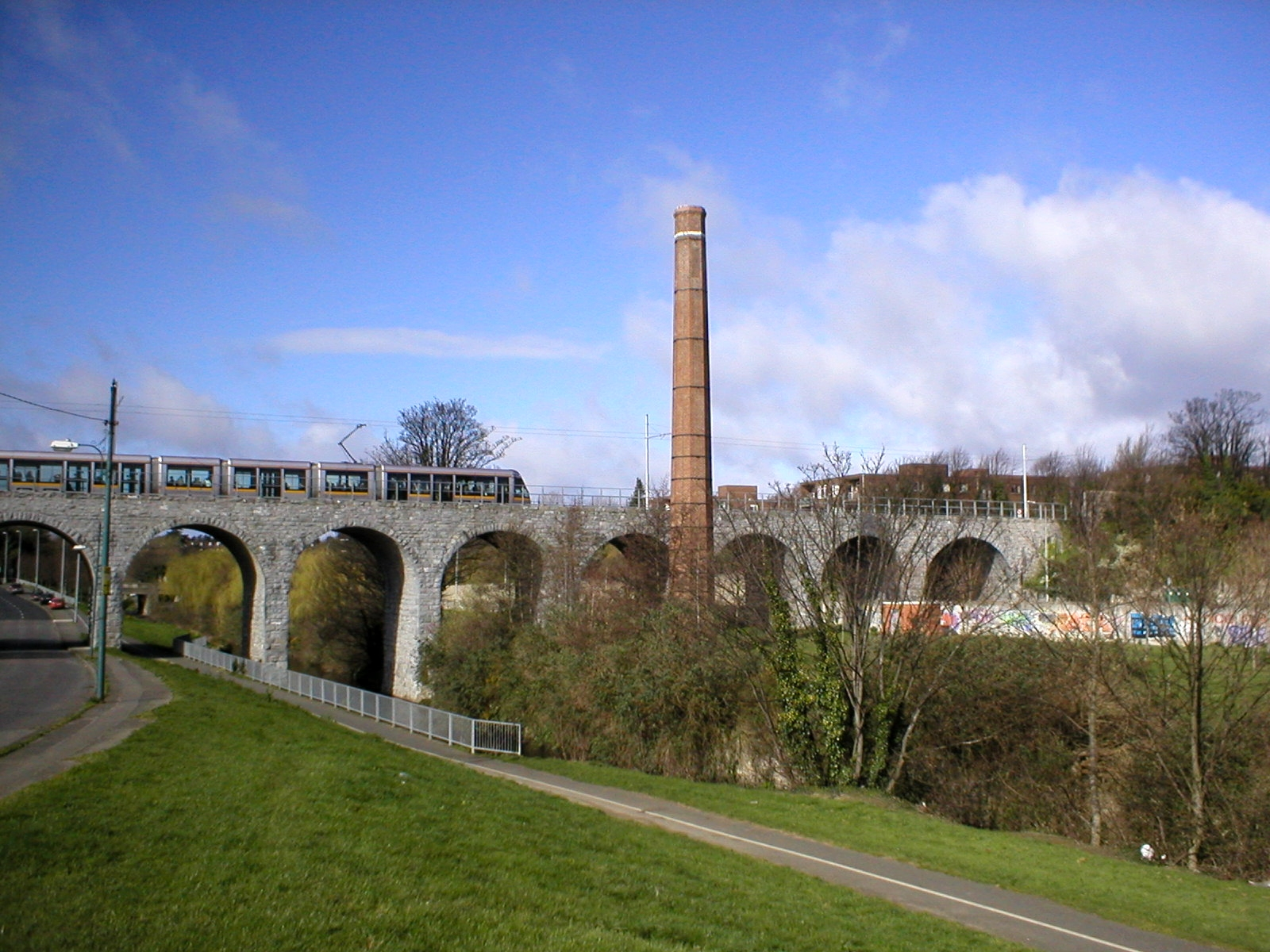
- The Nine Arches Viaduct over the River Dodder

- Location in Ireland
- Coordinates: 53.311°N 6.248°W
- Country: Ireland
- Province: Leinster
- County: Dublin
- Local government area: Dublin City Council

Population (2011)
  - Urban: 1,973
- Eircode routing key: D06
- Irish grid reference: O168302

Milltown (Irish: Baile an Mhuilinn) is a suburb and townland on the southside of Dublin, Ireland. Milltown was the site of several working mills on the River Dodder and is also the location of the meeting of the River Slang with the Dodder. It is located adjacent to other suburban areas such as Dundrum, Windy Arbour, Ranelagh, Rathmines, Dartry, Clonskeagh, and Donnybrook.

== History ==
The townland of Milltown, also known as Milton, was so named from at least the 14th century. Both Milltown and Clonskeagh were liberties of Dublin following the 13th-century Anglo-Norman invasion of Ireland.

In his 1903 work, A History of the County Dublin, the historian Francis Elrington Ball describes Milltown as being the "scene of industrial enterprise" from a "very early period" and that as "early as the fourteenth century the existence of a mill is mentioned". Ball also states that "mediaeval quarrying operations carried on at Milltown" provided stone for repairs to Dublin's Christ Church Cathedral.

By the 18th century, the area was home to several mills - including two corn mills, an iron mill and paper mill. A former mill race was taken from just above the weir located 100m downstream from the Nine Arches Viaduct. It ran towards a mill which was located in what is now Dodder Park. The remnants of this mill can still be seen.

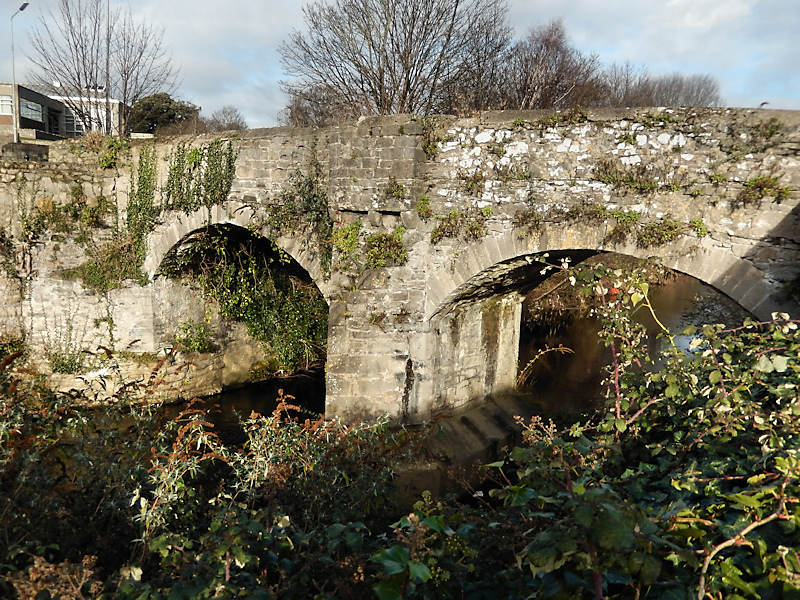
Old Milltown Bridge, also known as Packhorse Bridge, reportedly dates to the 1600s

Historically used as a fording point on the River Dodder, a bridge was built at Milltown in the 17th century. This bridge, known as "(Old) Milltown Bridge" or "Packhorse Bridge", is recorded in the Record of Monuments and Places and classified as a protected structure. A newer bridge was later built at Milltown, and by the early 20th century the older structure was used only for pedestrian traffic. The newer Milltown Bridge was built on the site of the former ford, which was in use up until at least the late 18th century.

== Transport ==
Milltown is marked by a landmark 19th-century railway bridge across the river, which was part of the Harcourt Street railway line which ran from Harcourt Street to Bray. This bridge, and sometimes the area immediately surrounding it, became known as the 'Nine Arches'. Milltown railway station opened on 1 May 1860 and finally closed on 31 December 1958. On 30 June 2004, the bridge was re-opened for the Luas light rail system which runs from Broombridge to Bride's Glen. There is also a Luas stop a few yards north of the former station.

Milltown is also served by Dublin Bus route 44 which runs from Dublin City University (DCU) to Enniskerry.

== Sport ==
The area is still associated with Shamrock Rovers football club, who played there at Glenmalure Park on land leased from the Jesuits, from 1926 until 1987 when it was controversially sold to developers. Milltown Golf Club celebrated its centenary in 2007.

== Administrative area ==
Milltown is located along the River Dodder, which in this area, marks the boundary between the two council areas of Dublin City Council and Dún Laoghaire–Rathdown County Council. Milltown lies in both, with the village falling within Dublin City.

== Education ==
Alexandra College, a Church of Ireland girls' school, is located in Milltown, as is the Ahlul Bayt Islamic Centre, the only Shia mosque in Ireland.

The Jesuits have a long presence at Milltown with a secondary school for boys, Gonzaga College on its lands at Milltown Park. The Jesuit Training College evolved into the Milltown Institute of Theology and Philosophy a recognised college of the National University of Ireland. The National College of Industrial Relations was also founded by Jesuits on its lands in Milltown, which eventually moved to the IFSC becoming the National College of Ireland.

The Franciscan Brothers of the Third Order Regular, noted for their having secretly taught the boys of the Catholic population for decades in underground schools, had formed a monastery and school here, after the relaxation of the Penal Laws which had forbidden Catholic education. In 1818 they transferred their monastery to Mountbellew in County Galway.

Mount St. Mary's was formerly the seminary of the Marist Fathers, students for the priesthood would study theology with the Jesuits in Milltown Park, and also study for degrees in Arts or Science in UCD, while based in Mount St. Marys.

== See also ==
- List of towns and villages in Ireland
- Old Moore's Almanac, an almanac which has been published since 1764 by Theophilus Moore, who ran a classical academy at Milltown
