= Obadiah Williams =

Obadiah Williams was a 19th-century wealthy Irish merchant of Huguenot origin. About 1810 he built and resided in the Dartry House, an imposing two-storey mansion in the Dublin suburban area of the same name.

In 1891, he was a co-founder of the Penygraig Industrial Co-Operative Society.
