= Cowper Luas stop =

Tram stop in Dublin, Ireland

Cowper
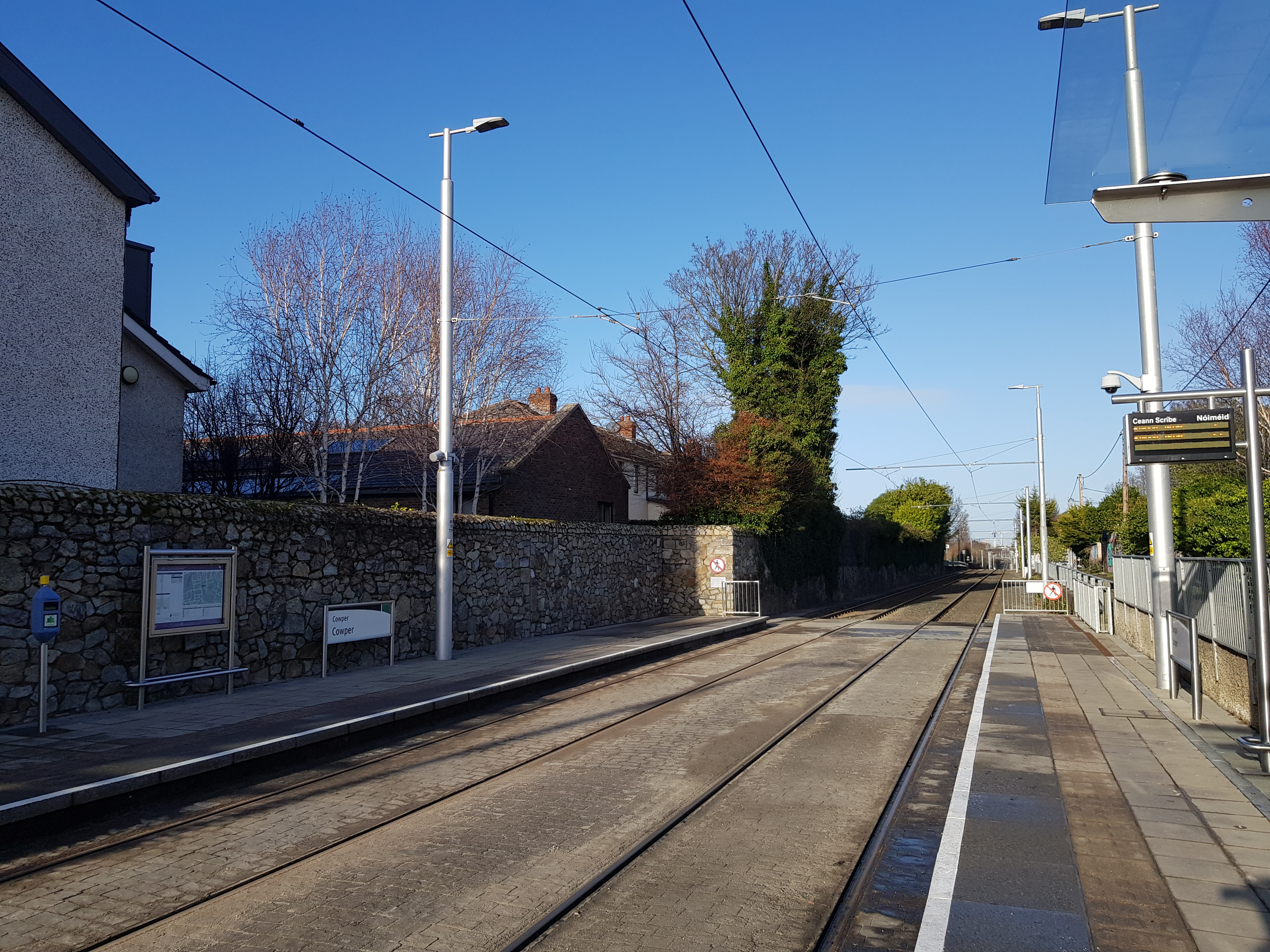
- Cowper Luas stop

General information
- Location: Cowper Road; Rathmines, County Dublin; Ireland
- Coordinates: 53°18′59″N 6°15′12″W
- Owner: Transport Infrastructure Ireland
- Operator: Transdev (as Luas)
- Line: Green
- Platforms: 2

Construction
- Structure type: At-grade

Other information
- Fare zone: Green 2

Key dates
- 30 June 2004: Stop opened
- 2018: Platforms extended

Services
| Preceding station | Luas | Following station |
|---|---|---|
| Beechwood towards Parnell or Broombridge | Green Line | Milltown towards Sandyford or Brides Glen |
Location
- Location within Dublin

Cowper /ˈkaʊpər/ is a stop on the Luas light-rail tram system in Dublin, Ireland. It opened in 2004 as a stop on the Green Line from St Stephen's Green to Sandyford. It serves parts of Ranelagh and Rathmines.

== Location and access ==
The Green Line runs on mostly segregated track, making use of the disused railway alignment from Bray to Harcourt Street. The Cowper stop is located between the backs of residential properties. The stop has the signs, displays, shelters, and ticket machines common to all Luas stops. It has two entrances: one from Merton Road and one from Tudor Road. Both entrances consist of simple tree-lined pathways and lead to the southern end of the platforms. The Merton Road entrance is signposted with a solar-powered totem.

It takes its name from the nearby Cowper Road, which is named for William Cowper-Temple, 1st Baron Mount Temple (1811–1888), who formerly owned land in the area. He pronounced his name "cooper", but the stop is pronounced "cow-per."

== Services ==
Trams stop at the stop coming from either end every 2-10 minutes.

| Preceding station | Luas | Following station |
|---|---|---|
| Beechwood towards Parnell or Broombridge | Green Line | Milltown towards Sandyford or Brides Glen |
