= River Dodder =

River in Dublin in Ireland

Coordinates: 53°16′41″N 6°21′8″W

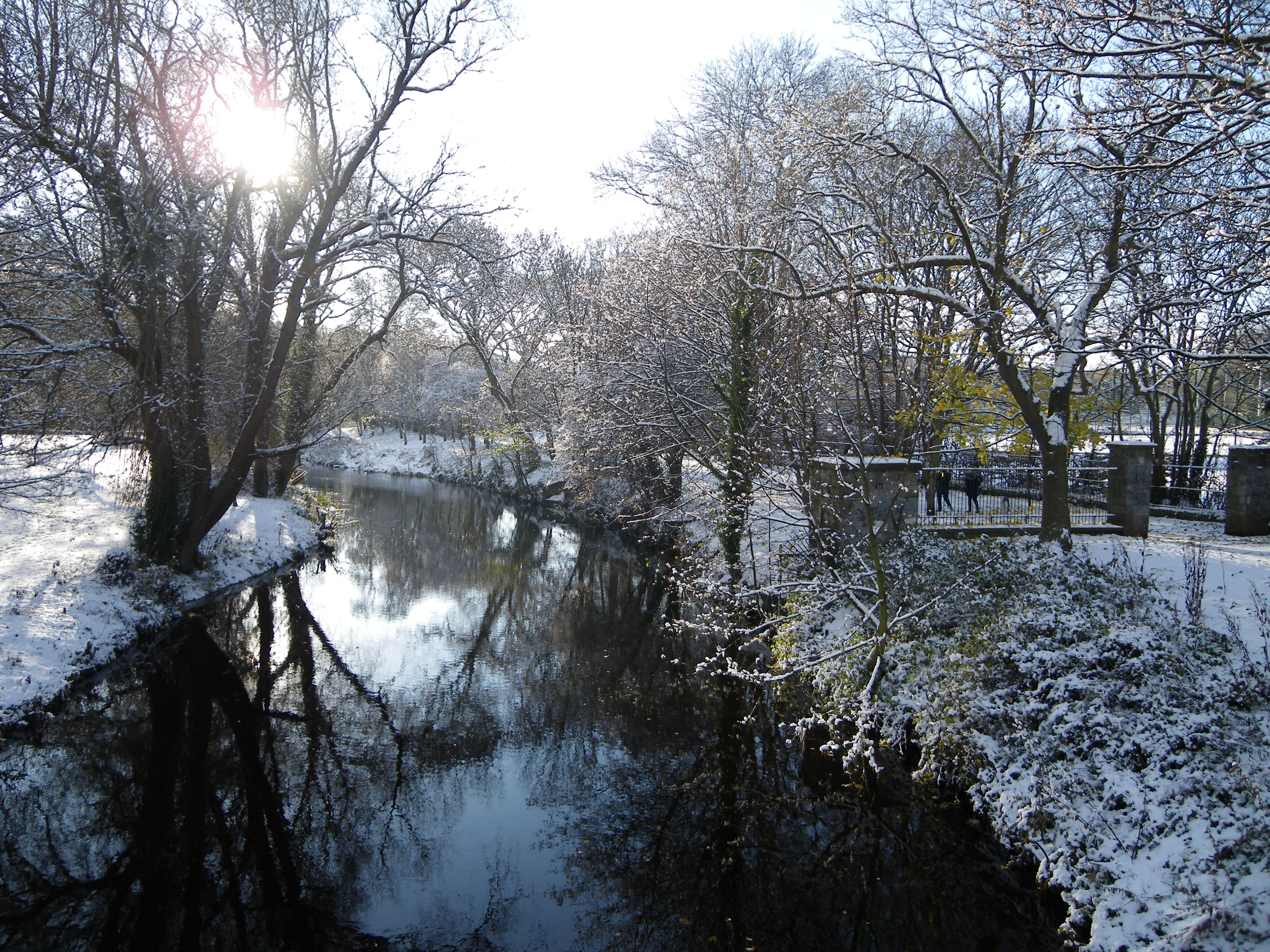
- Dodder through Rathgar
- Etymology: Old Irish dothar, possibly meaning "river" or a Pre-Celtic substrate word
- Native name: An Dothra (Irish)

Physical characteristics
- Source
  - location: Kippure Mountain, County Dublin
  - elevation: 763 m (2,503 ft)
- Mouth
  - location: Dublin Docklands, ultimately Dublin Bay (River Liffey)
- Length: 26 km (16 mi)
- Basin size: 120.8 km^{2} (46.6 sq mi)

Basin features
- River system: River Liffey
- Tributaries
  - left: Cot Brook, Slade Brook, Glassavullaun, Ballymaice Stream, Jobstown (or Whitestown) Stream, Muckross Stream, Swan River
  - right: Mareen's Brook, Ballinascorney Stream, Piperstown Stream, Owendoher River (with Whitechurch Stream), Little Dargle River (with Castle Stream), River Slang (Dundrum River, with Wyckham Stream)

The River Dodder (Irish: An Dothra) is one of the three main rivers in Dublin, Ireland, the others being the Liffey, of which the Dodder is the largest tributary, and the Tolka.

== Course and system ==
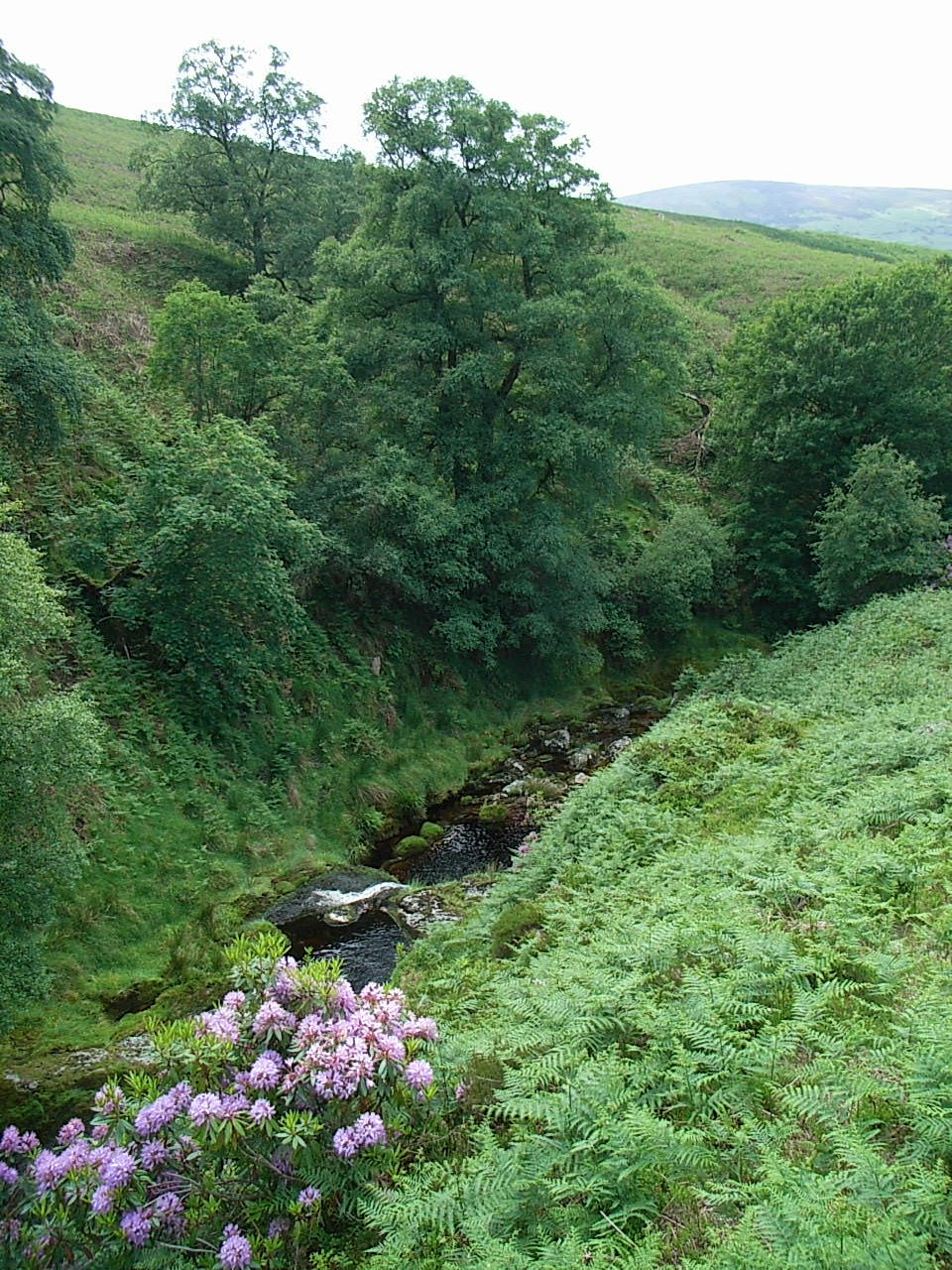
Dodder in the Dublin Mountains, 2.5 km from its source, in 2001

The Dodder rises on the northern slopes of Kippure in the Wicklow Mountains and is formed from several streams. The headwaters flow from Kippure Ridge, and include, and are often mapped solely as, Tromanallison (Allison's Brook), which is then joined by Mareen's Brook, including the Cataract of the Brown Rowan, and then the combined flow meeting the Cot and Slade Brooks.

In the river's valley at Glenasmole are the two Bohernabreena Reservoirs, a major part of the Dublin water supply system.

The Dodder is 26 kilometres (16 mi) long. It passes the Dublin suburbs of Tallaght and then Firhouse, travels by Templeogue, passes Rathfarnham, Rathgar, Milltown, Clonskeagh, and Donnybrook, and goes through Ballsbridge and past Sandymount, before entering the Liffey near Ringsend, along with the Grand Canal, at Grand Canal Dock.

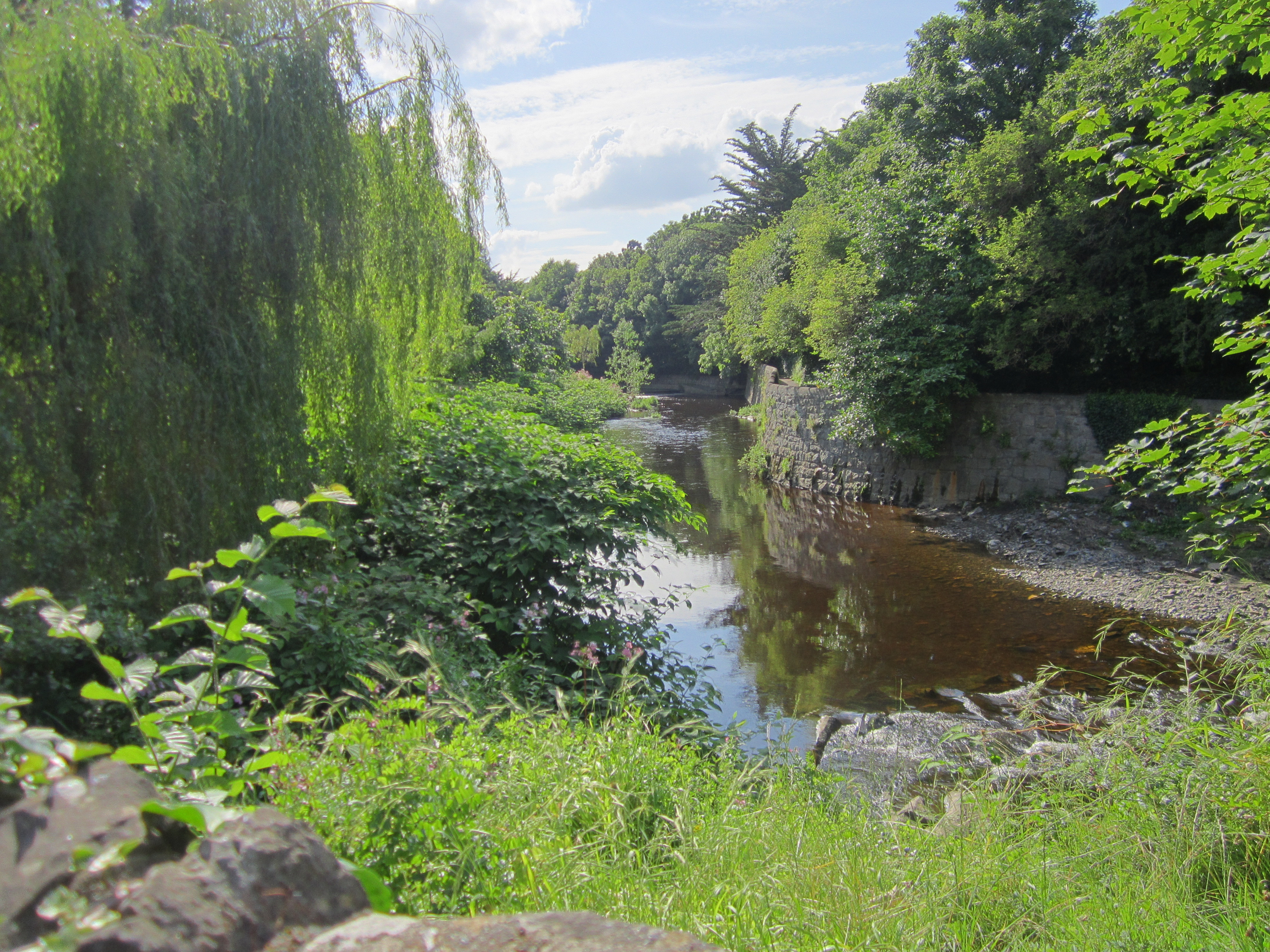
Dodder at Milltown, 2012

There is a weir just above the bridge at Ballsbridge and the river becomes tidal roughly where the bridge at Lansdowne Road crosses it. The Dodder and the River Tolka are Dublin's second-largest rivers, after the Liffey.

=== Tributaries ===
The Dodder's main tributaries after Glenasmole, in and prior to which many streams join, are the Jobstown (or Whitestown) Stream, the Owendoher River and its tributary the Whitechurch Stream, the Little Dargle River (with Castle Stream and other tributaries), the Slang or Dundrum River, the Swan River (or Water), and the small Muckross Stream.

=== Link with the Poddle ===
The River Poddle, a tributary of the Liffey in its own right, was linked with the River Dodder from a large weir, in Balrothery, north of Firhouse village, from the 13th century. This weir, variously called the City, Great, Balrothery or Firhouse Weir, facilitated the offtake of part of the Dodder flow through a sluice and canal structure, known as the "City Watercourse", which ran through part of Templeogue. This link formerly provided much of Dublin City's water supply. It was partly piped in the mid-20th century, and the connection was later broken by housing development. All that remains now are a small channel from the weir, dead-ending less than 100m from the weir, and some unseen underground flows.

== History ==
The Dodder lay well beyond the original city of Dublin but began to have an important impact in the 13th century when water from its course was diverted to boost the small Poddle River, which in turn supplied fresh water to parts of Dublin.

In the late 1400s, the river itself was probably regarded as part of the defensive ditch of the Pale which surrounded Dublin, according to Archbishop Alen's Register, which in 1487-8 described the line of the Pale thus:

And in the third yere of King Henrie the seventhe, by acte of Parliament in Drogheda holden the friday after the Epiphanie, the bundes if the iiij obedient shires within the Macre distinct from the Marches were limite with in the countie of Dublin from Miryonge (Merrion) (inclusive) to the water of Dodor (Dodder), by the neve diche (ditch) to Tassagarde, Rathcowle, Kilhele, Rathmor and Ballymor, and so from thens to the countie of Kildare etc.

Over centuries, the Dodder and its tributaries drove many mills, crucial to Dublin's industrial base, but all are now disused. In many cases, all traces have been erased but there are some remaining, such as millraces. The de Meones family, who gave their name to the nearby suburb of Rathmines, owned a mill in that area as early as the mid-fourteenth century. In the sixteenth century much of the surrounding lands belonged to the Talbot family, ancestors of the Talbots of Mount Talbot. In the seventeenth and eighteenth centuries the Domvile family, who owned much of Templeogue, effectively controlled access to much of the river, which passed through their estates. At that time the Dodder was the main source of Dublin's drinking water, and whether fairly or unfairly, the Domviles were accused of using their control of the Dublin water supply to further their own selfish ends, by threatening to divert its course if their wishes were not met. In fact, the legal right to control the course of the river was vested in the Mayor and Corporation of Dublin; this was confirmed by a court ruling as early as 1527.

=== Flooding ===
The river floods some surrounding areas from time to time, as it is too short and shallow to hold the volume of water which pours into it from its tributaries during heavy rain. The River Dodder "has a history of flooding and is known as a "flashy" river with a quick response to rainstorms."

A flood on the Dodder in March 1628 claimed the life of Arthur Ussher, Deputy Clerk to the Privy Council of Ireland, who was "carried away by the current, nobody being able to succour him, although many persons.... his nearest friends, were by on both sides."

The two greatest Dodder floods before 1986 occurred on 25 August 1905, and on 3 and 4 August 1931. Hurricane Charley (often spelt "Charlie" in Ireland) passed south of the country on 25 August 1986. In 24 hours, 200mm (almost 8 inches) of rain poured down on Kippure Mountain while 100mm fell on Dublin causing heavy river flooding, including the Dodder in many places, and hardship and loss were experienced.

It has long been recognised that the problem of flooding is very difficult to solve, due to the sheer volume of water which pours into the river during periods of heavy rainfall.

== Flora and fauna ==
There is an abundance of flora and fauna at the river. However, as the river flows through urban areas, pollution has long been a problem.

=== Flora ===
Flora along the river is varied. Bryophytes and algae are common with an abundance of filamentous green algae. Japanese knotweed, Himalayan balsam and Rhododendron ponticum are the only invasive species recorded along the river.

=== Fauna ===
The Dodder is home to many water-bird species including mallard, grey heron, kingfisher, dipper, coot, moorhen, grey wagtail, common sandpiper, cormorant and mute swan; the sparrowhawk nests in the trees lining the riverbanks. The red fox is common along the riverbank and the badger and otter have also been seen. In recent years a small feral population of mandarin ducks has become established by the river. It was reported in 2013 that an Irish Wildlife Trust survey found otters living along the Dodder.

Fish present in the river include brown trout, sea trout, stone loach, three-spined stickleback and European eel. Atlantic salmon can also be found in the river's lower course.

Atlantic salmon and lamprey eels are expected to return to most of the river after a more than 200-year absence pending the construction of fish ladders

==== Fishing and angling ====
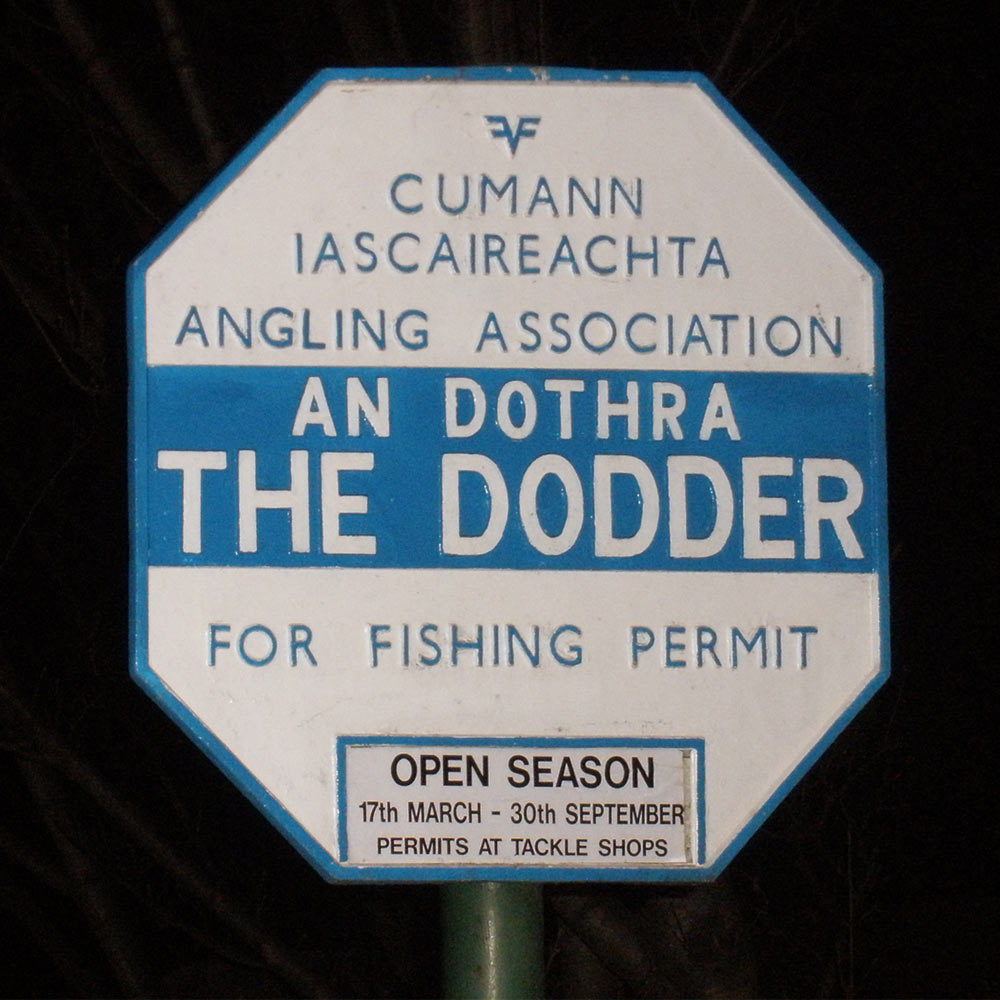
Angling association sign on the riverbank

The Dodder is a popular river for fishing and angling amongst Dubliners. The fishing season is open between 17 March and 30 September.

== Books ==
The Dodder is the main focus of Down the Dodder (Christopher Moriarty, 1998) and The Rivers Dodder and Poddle (McEntee and Corcoran, 2016), and is also discussed in multiple more general books, including The Rivers of Dublin (Sweeney, 1991), and Ten Dozen Waters: The Rivers and Streams of County Dublin (Doyle, 2008 et seq) and other volumes by the same author.

== Gallery ==
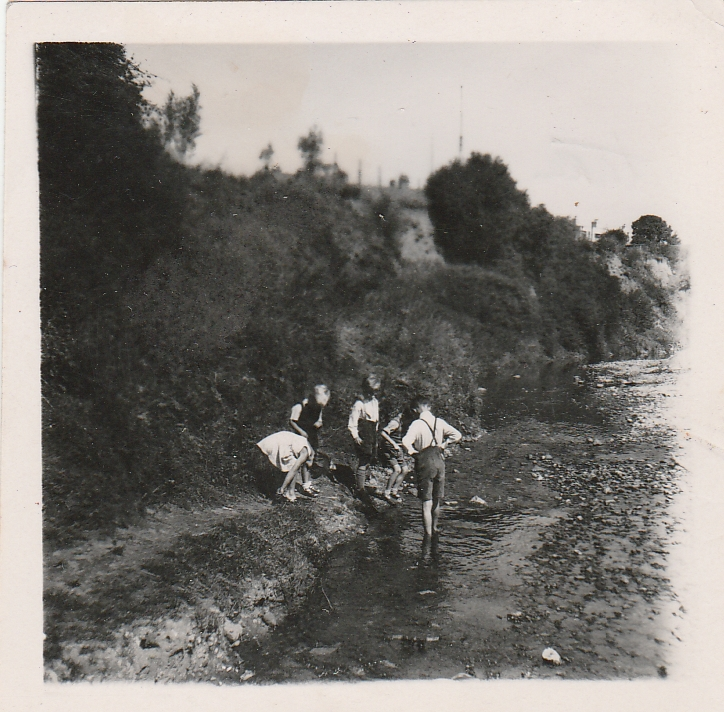
Children playing in the river in Templeogue in the 1950s

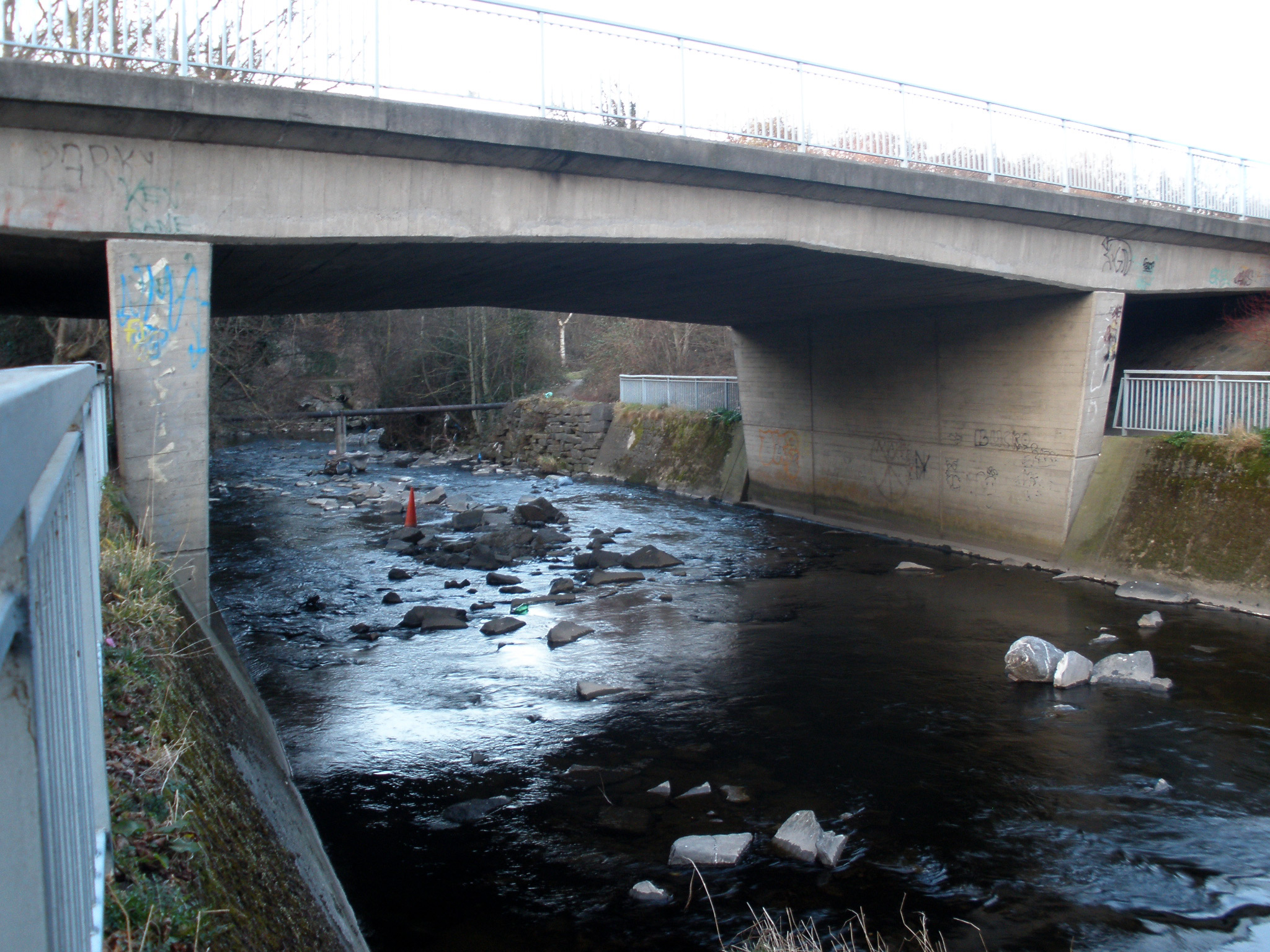
Passing under the bridge at Springfield Avenue, Templeogue

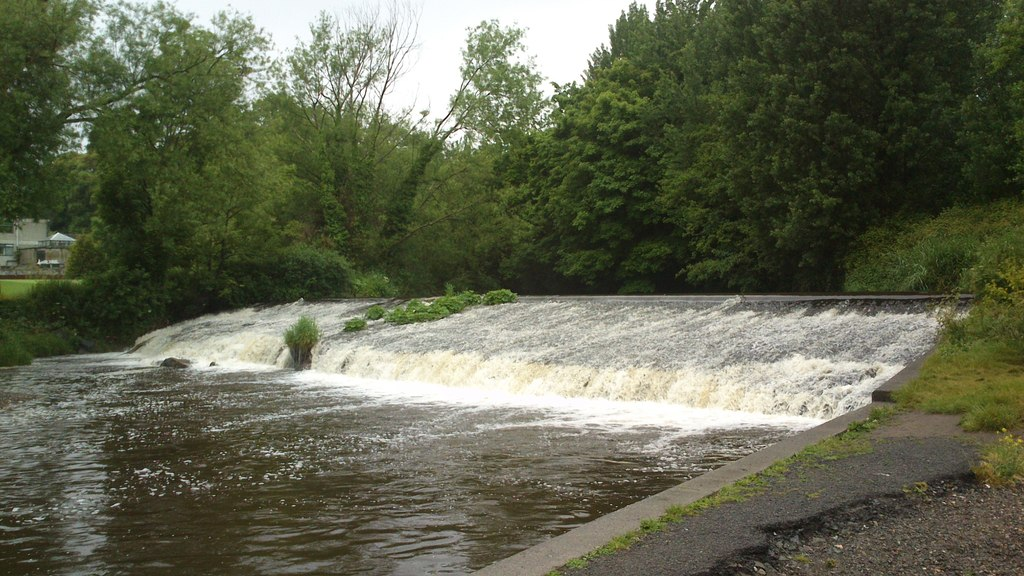
The river passes a weir in the Dartry area

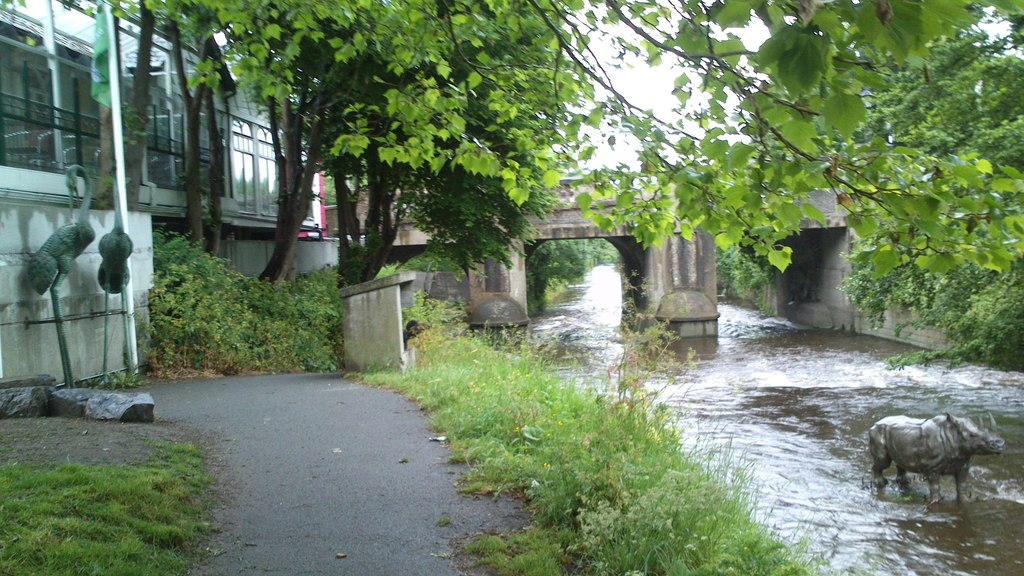
The river with in-flow sculpture

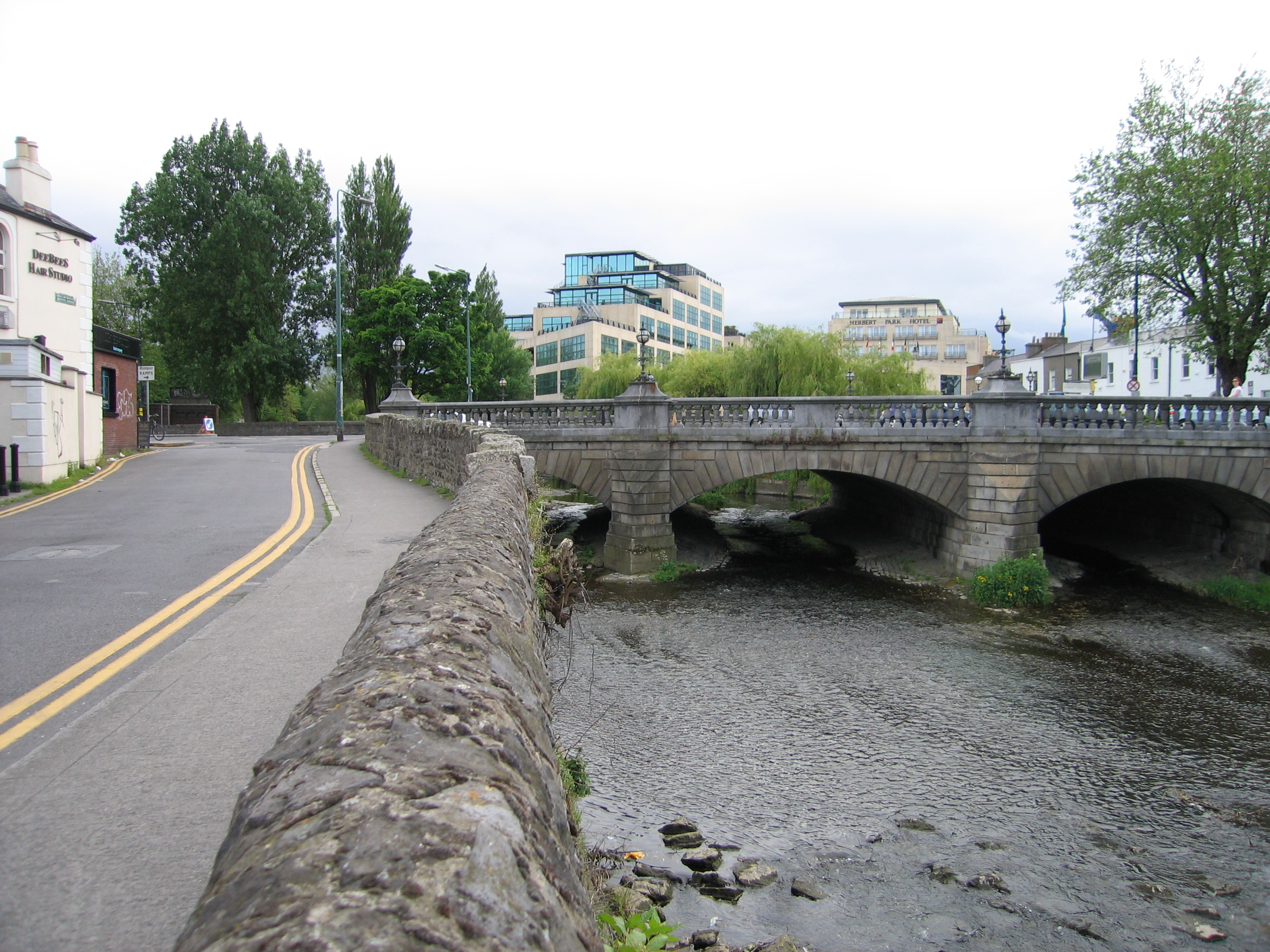
The Dodder at Ballsbridge

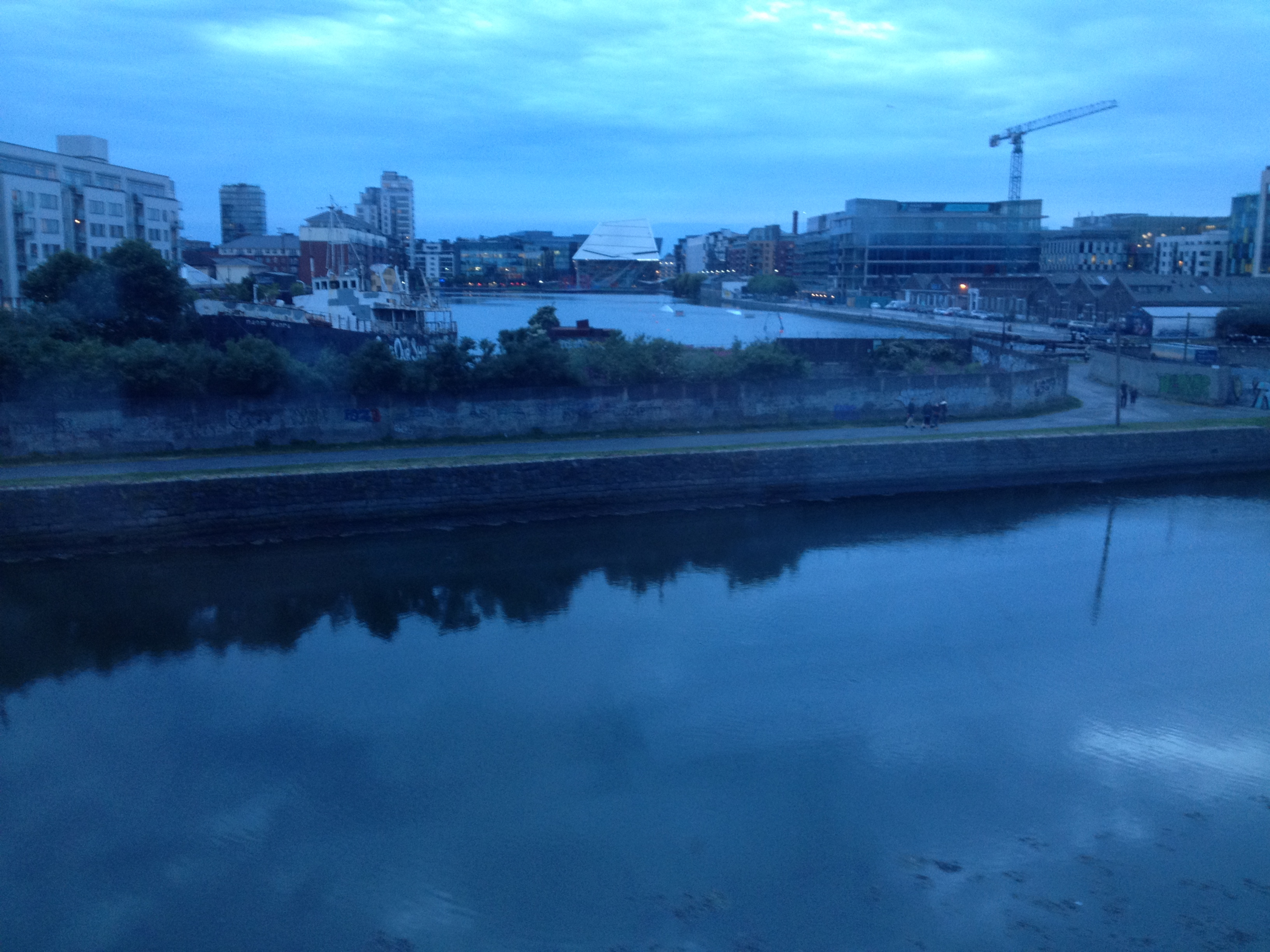
Overlooking the Grand Canal Basin, Facebook and the Bord Gáis Theatre, roughly 300 metres from the River Liffey.

== See also ==
- Dodder Park
- List of bridges over the River Dodder
- List of rivers of County Dublin
- Rivers of Ireland
