= Ranelagh Luas stop =

Tram stop in Dublin, Ireland

Ranelagh Raghnallach
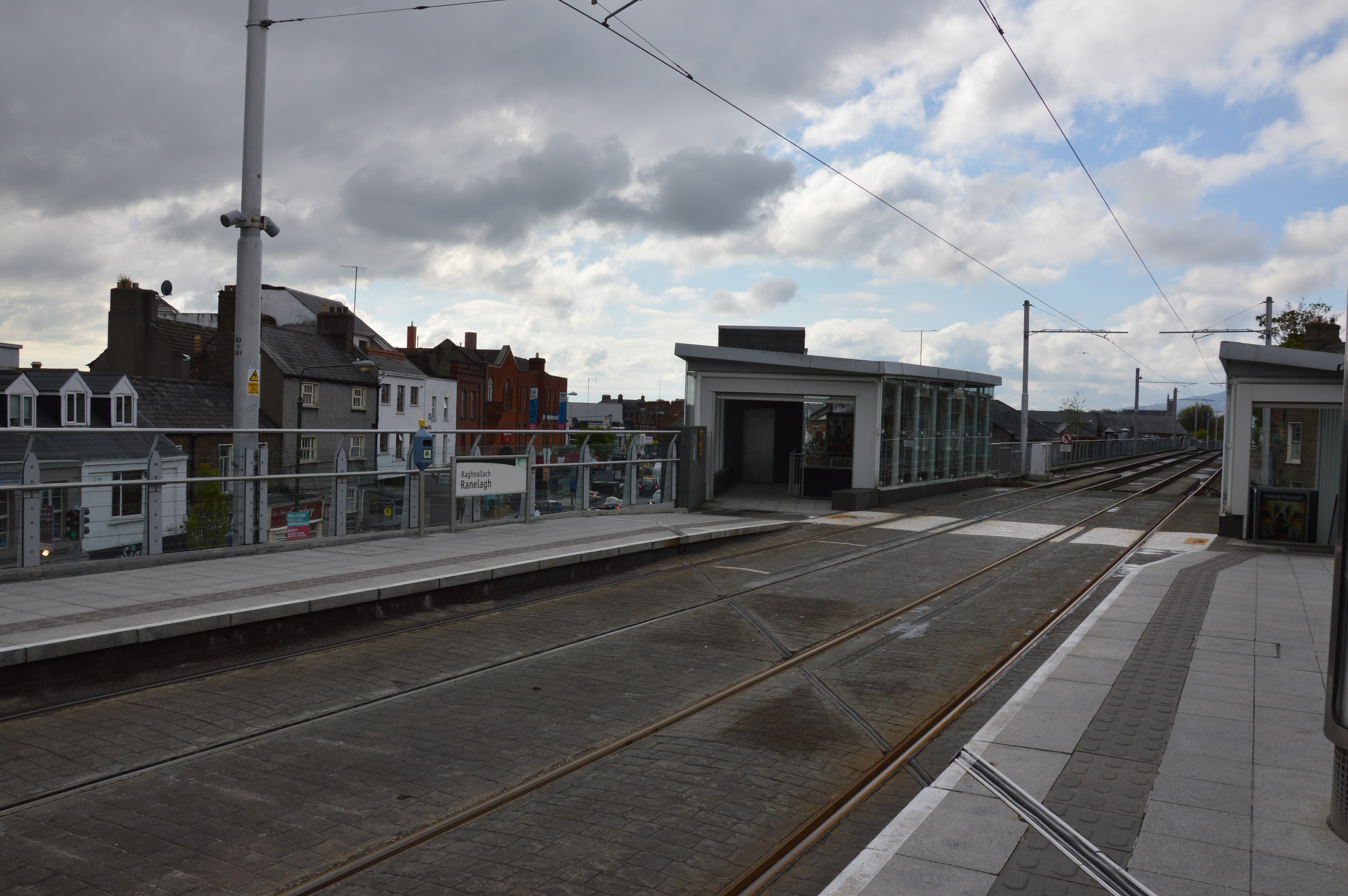
- The platforms and entrances at Ranelagh

General information
- Location: Ranelagh Road; Ranelagh, County Dublin; Ireland
- Coordinates: 53°19′34″N 6°15′22″W
- Owner: Transport Infrastructure Ireland
- Operator: Transdev (as Luas)
- Line: Green
- Platforms: 2
- Bus routes: 3
- Bus operators: Dublin Bus
- Connections: 44; 44D; S2

Construction
- Structure type: Elevated
- Accessible: Yes

Other information
- Fare zone: Green 2

Key dates
- 30 June 2004: Stop opened
- 2018: Platforms extended
Location
- Location within Dublin

Ranelagh (/ˈrænələ/ RAN-ə-lə, locally /ˈrɛn-/ REN-; Irish: Raghnallach) is a stop on the Luas light-rail tram system in Dublin, Ireland. It opened in 2004 as a stop on the Green Line from St Stephen's Green to Sandyford. It provides access to the urban villages of Ranelagh and Rathmines.

== Location and access ==
The Green Line re-uses the alignment of the Harcourt Street railway line, which closed in 1958. The Luas stop at Ranelagh is on a stretch of track where the line crosses Ranelagh Road on a viaduct. The Harcourt Street line did not have a station here (a station called Rathmines and Ranelagh was situated further down the line, at the location of the present Beechwood Luas stop). The bridge over Ranelagh Road consists of a steel deck constructed in 2004, and the existing stone abutments.

Ranelagh is one of few Luas stops to have a station building of sorts - a two-storey structure located on Ranelagh Road. The building has a wide entrance, above which is a sign showing the stop's name in the same style as on the platform signs. Inside, the building has little more than tiled steps leading to both platforms. A lift also provides step-free access from the street to the southbound platform. A section of the building is used as a retail unit and is currently occupied by a restaurant. The platforms at Ranelagh are located directly above Ranelagh Road and have the benches, ticket machines, shelters, and displays common to all Luas stops.

=== Services ===
Trams stop at the stop coming from either end every 2-10 minutes.

== Onward transport ==
Dublin Bus routes 44/d and S2 serve the stop connecting the stop with areas such as Rathmines and Ballsbridge, as well as further destinations such as Kimmage, Sandymount and Irishtown.

Preceding station	Luas	Following station
Charlemont towards Parnell or Broombridge	Green Line	Beechwood towards Sandyford or Brides Glen
