= Windy Arbour Luas stop =

Tram stop in Dublin, Ireland

Windy Arbour Na Glasáin
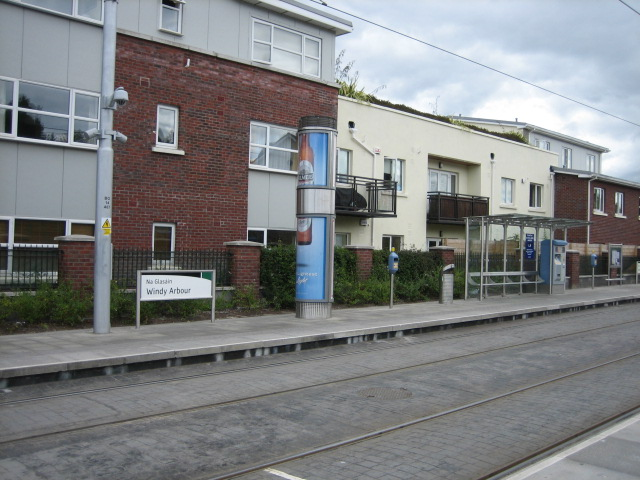
- The northbound platform at Windy Arbour

General information
- Location: Churchtown Road Lower/St. Columbanus' Road; Windy Arbour, County Dublin; Ireland
- Coordinates: 53°18′06″N 6°15′03″W
- Owner: Transport Infrastructure Ireland
- Operator: Transdev (as Luas)
- Line: Green
- Platforms: 2

Construction
- Structure type: At-grade

Other information
- Fare zone: Green 2

Key dates
- 30 June 2004: Stop opened
- 2018: Platforms extended
Location
- Location within Dublin

Windy Arbour (Irish: Na Glasáin) is a stop on the Luas light-rail tram system in Dublin, Ireland. It opened in 2004 as a stop on the Green Line from St Stephen's Green to Sandyford. It serves the suburbs of Windy Arbour, Churchtown, and Clonskeagh.

== Location and access ==
The Green Line runs on mostly segregated track, making use of the disused railway alignment of the disused railway alignment from Bray to Harcourt Street. The Windy Arbour stop is located between Churchtown Road Lower and St. Columbanus' Road on the site of a former footbridge that crossed over the railway. The stop has the signs, displays, shelters, and ticket machines common to all Luas stops. It has entrances from each of the neighbouring roads. The Churchtown Road entrance consists of a layby which can be used by cars and buses to drop off Luas passengers. The St. Columbanus' Road entrance is a paved plaza leading from a bend in the road to the northern end of the platforms.

The stop is also served by Dublin Bus routes 44, and 44D.

== Services ==
Trams stop at the stop coming from either end every 2-10 minutes.

Preceding station	Luas	Following station
Milltown towards Parnell or Broombridge	Green Line	Dundrum towards Sandyford or Brides Glen
