= Dundrum Luas stop =

Tram/light rail stop in Dublin, Ireland

Dundrum Dún Droma
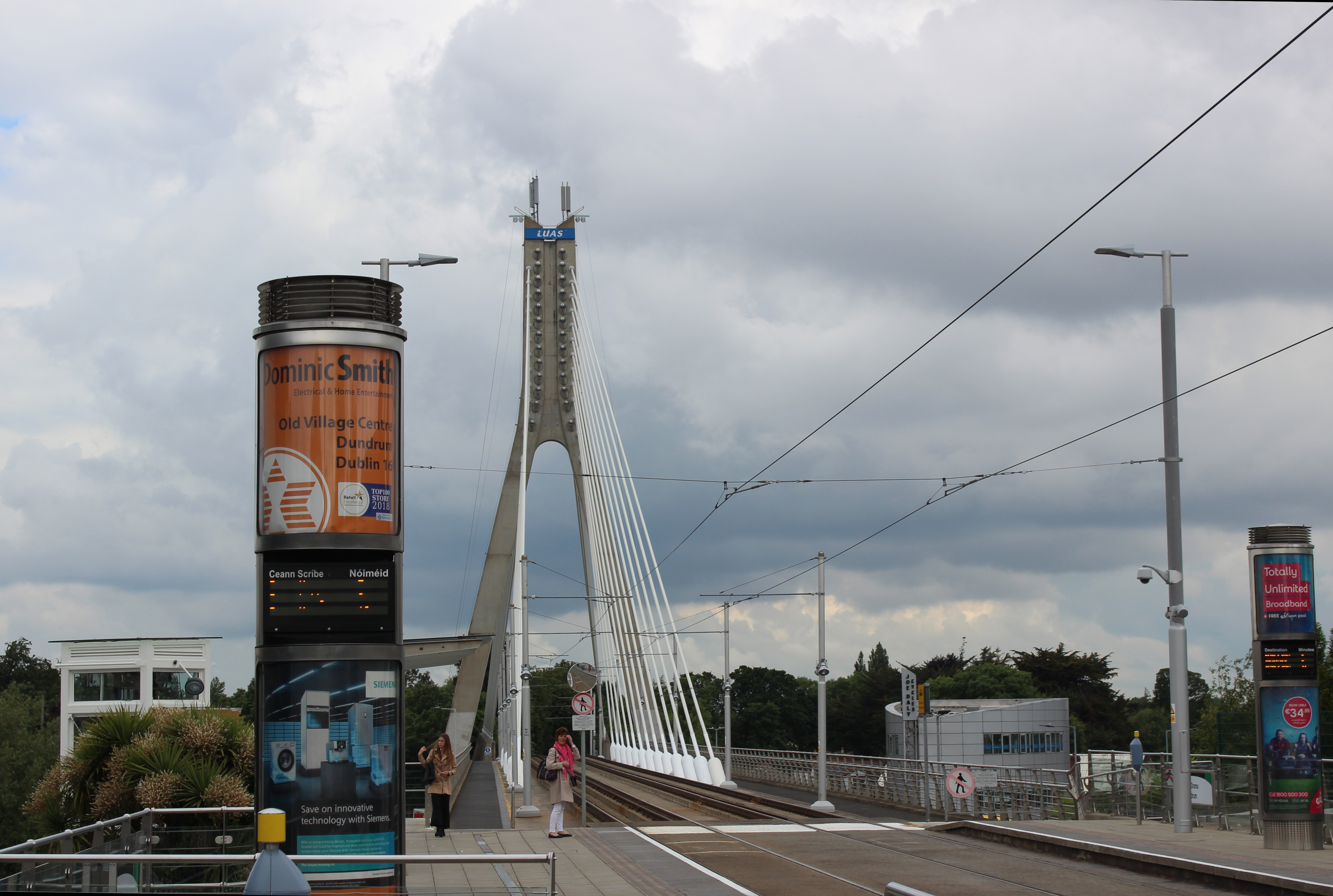
- View of the platforms and bridge

General information
- Location: Taney Drive; Dundrum, County Dublin; Ireland
- Coordinates: 53°17′32″N 6°14′42″W
- Owner: Transport Infrastructure Ireland
- Operator: Transdev (as Luas)
- Line: Green
- Platforms: 2
- Bus routes: 14; 44; 44B; 44D; 46N; 74; 161; 750; L25; S6
- Bus operators: Dublin Bus; Dublin Coach; Go-Ahead Ireland

Construction
- Structure type: Elevated
- Accessible: Yes

Other information
- Fare zone: Green 2/3

Key dates
- 10 July 1854: Station opened
- 31 December 1958: Station closed
- 30 June 2004: Luas stop opened
- 2018: Platforms extended
Location
- Location within Dublin

Dundrum (Irish: Dún Droma) is a stop on the Luas light rail tram system in Dublin, Ireland which serves the suburb of Dundrum. It opened in 2004 as a stop on the Green Line, which re-uses the alignment of the Harcourt Street railway line which closed in 1958. Dundrum Luas stop is built on the same site as a former heavy rail station of the same name.

== History ==
=== Railway station (1854–1958) ===
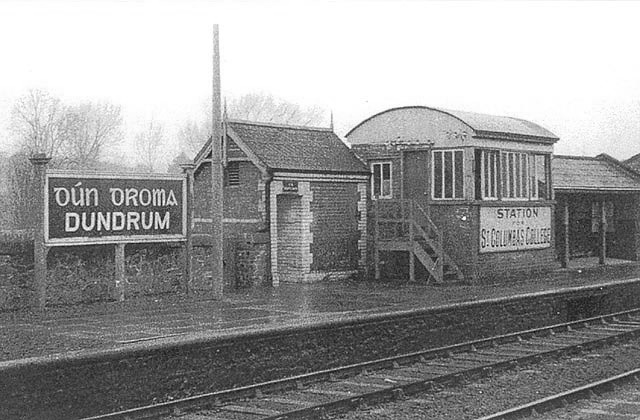
The down platform at Dundrum station in 1912

The Harcourt Street railway line was built by the Dublin, Wicklow and Wexford Railway and opened in 1854, running from a temporary terminus at Harcourt Road near the city centre to Bray. Dundrum was one of the four original intermediate stops along with Stillorgan, Carrickmines and Shankill. The station was located at the side of Taney Road, which the line crossed on a bridge.

Dundrum was more elaborate than other stations on the Harcourt Street line and was subsequently the most popular station on the line. The station was designed by William Dargan, who lived in the area and regularly used the station. It had buildings on both platforms: the up (Dublin-bound) platform featured waiting rooms and a signal box. The down platform was the location of the station master's house. and the main station building with the ticket hall. This building had one storey, and its entrance from the platform was via a small portico with the roof suspended by a colonnade. This area could be used as a passenger waiting shelter. The platforms were linked by both an iron footbridge and a granite subway.

A short siding was located to the south of the station, allowing goods trains to terminate.

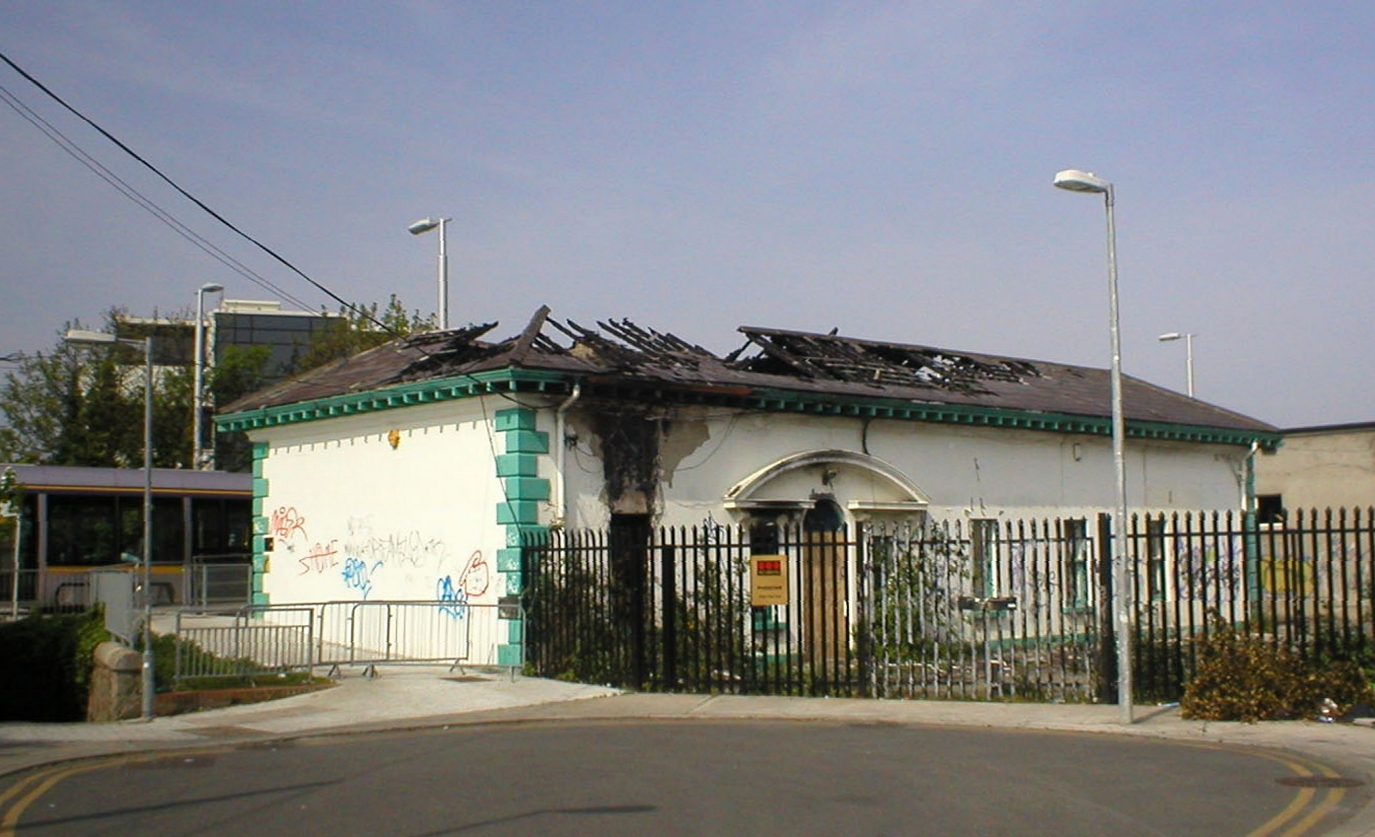
The station building in its former derelict state

For many years, Dundrum was served as the destination for boarding students attending St Columba's College in Rathfarnham over two miles away. For this reason the signal cabin on the northbound platform carried a large sign reading Station for St Columba's College, which was almost as large as the station name board.

=== Closure (1959–2004) ===
The Harcourt Street line had declined in use throughout the early 20th century and was becoming rundown in the 1940s and 50s. Dundrum was the last station on the line to serve goods, up until the 1950s. While Dundrum was still more busy than the other stations, it wasn't receiving enough income to justify the line's existence and the Harcourt Street line was closed by CIÉ at the end of 1958, much to objection from the community. The tracks were lifted soon after and all stations on the route were auctioned off. The waiting rooms, signal cabin, and house at Dundrum were demolished in the years that followed. The station building survived, but fell into disuse. The nearby bridge over the road was removed following the track removal and became the catalyst for the Dundrum flood of 1963 when heavy rainfall caused the banks of the former station to burst and flood across the village. The beams and embankment were demolished in 1971 during the construction of the junction for Churchtown, Dundrum and Taney roads.

=== Luas (2004–present) ===
Construction of the first phase of the Luas system commenced in 2001 and concluded in 2004. The route chosen for the Green Line re-used the old Harcourt Street alignment between Charlemont and Sandyford Stillorgan, and Dundrum station was rebuilt as a Luas stop. The original subway was restored, allowing it to be once again used for passage under the tracks. The surviving station building was not affected by construction, and remained at the side of the stop for many years in its derelict state. However, it has since been restored and turned into a clothes store.

In the years following the original station's closure, the roads around it were rearranged into a crossroads. An elaborate cable-stayed bridge was constructed in the place of the old road bridge. It was named the William Dargan Bridge in honour of William Dargan the engineer who built the original railway line.

In 2018, the platforms were lengthened from 45 to 55 metres. This was to accommodate the new longer trams introduced to boost capacity.

== Facilities and Services ==
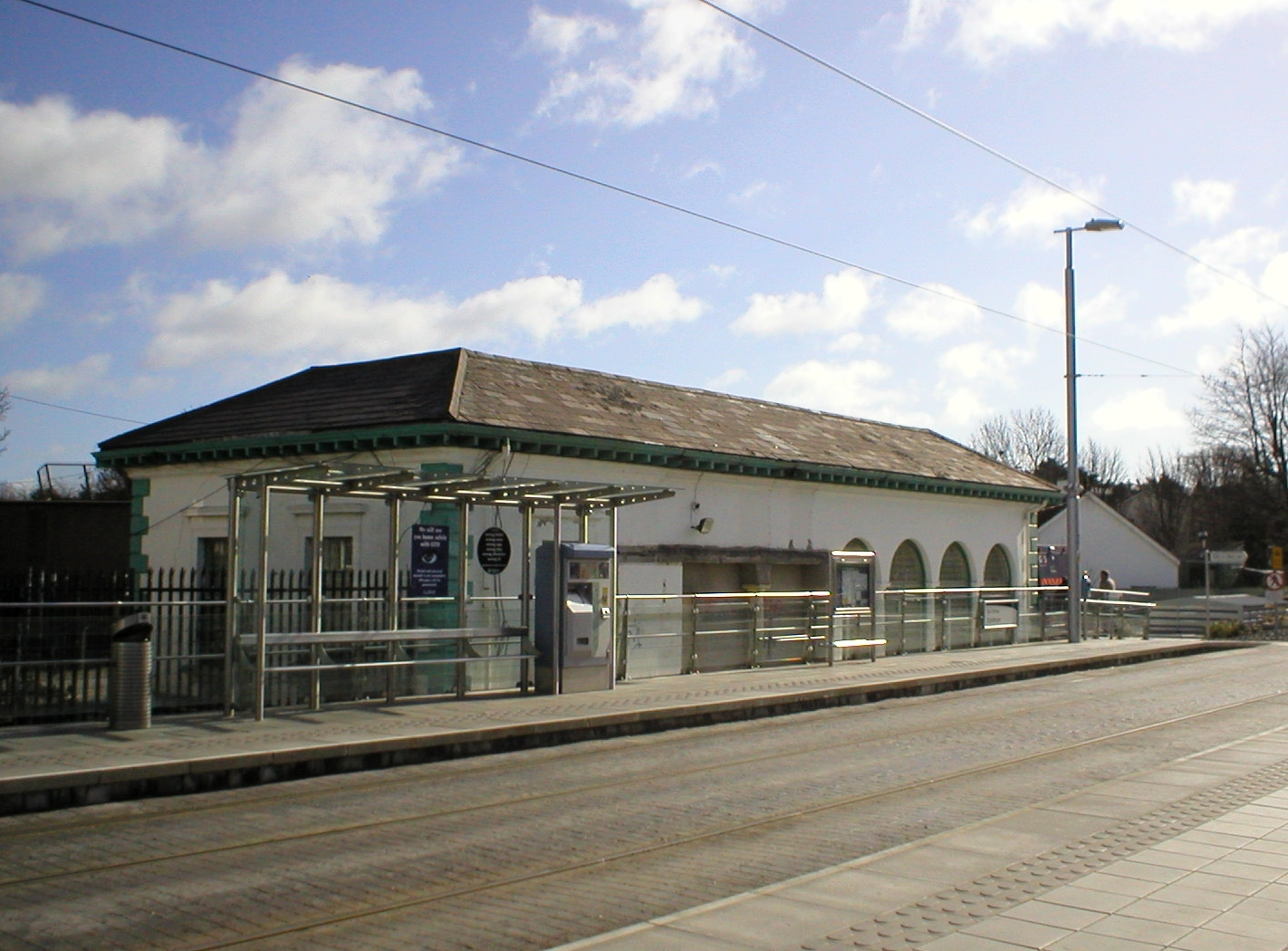
Southbound platform in 2007

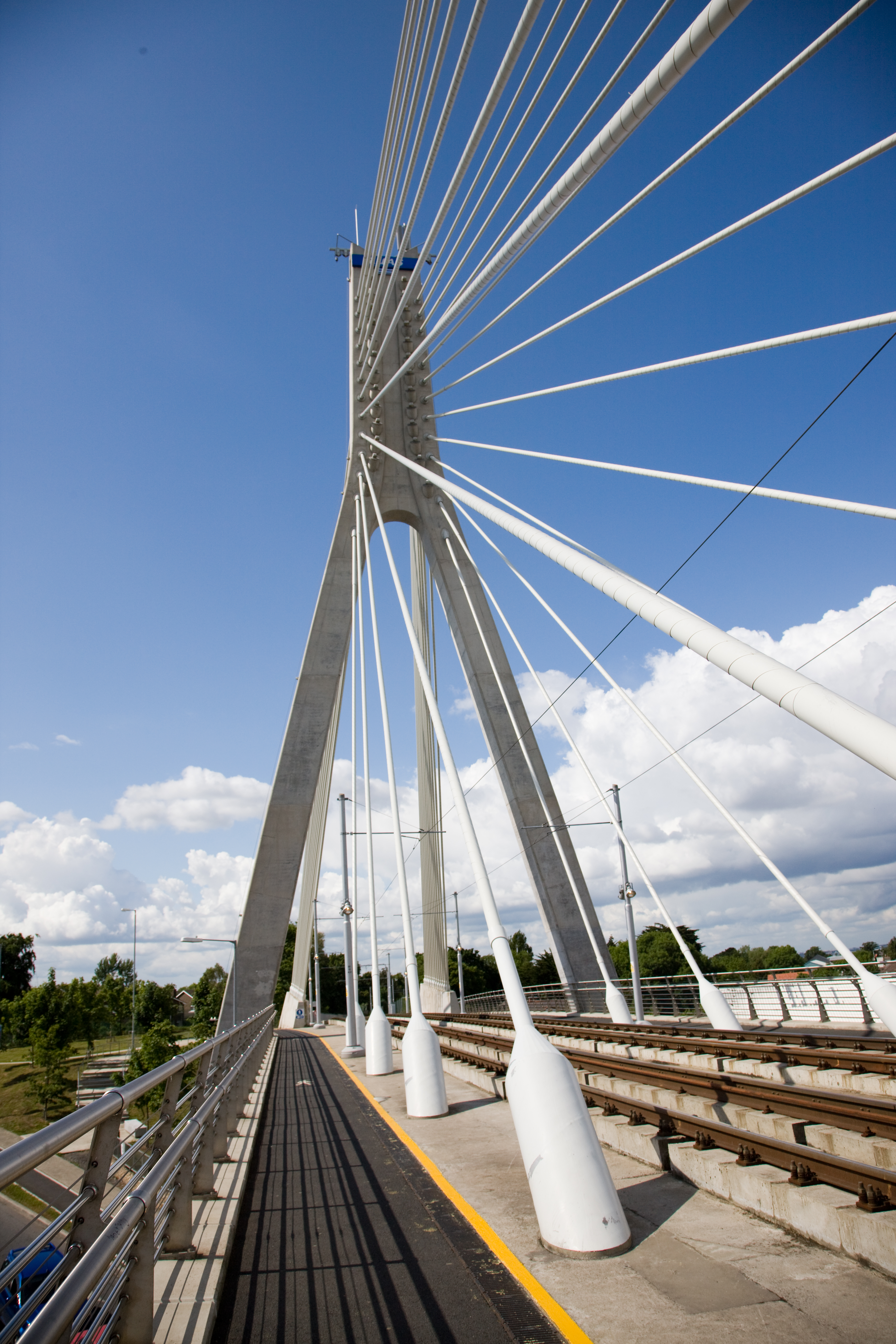
William Dargan Bridge

Dundrum has the same facilities as the majority of stations along the Luas Green line, sheltered benches, ticket machines, signs, and time displays. In addition to these, the station also has a 24/7 Cycle and Ride Facility, with space for 52 bikes, made up of 10 bike lockers and 21 bike racks. The old station building, next to the southbound platform, is now two separate stores, a formal garment shop and a hat shop. The building has been extended by turning the arches of the colonnade into windows, making it the exterior wall.

The stop has four entrances and exits: a pathway that leads from the southern end of the southbound platform to Taney Drive, a staircase adjacent to Dundrum's Main Street (a pedestrian subway links both these entrances for those wishing to avoid the stop altogether). A footpath along the Eastern side of the William Dargan Bridge links Churchtown Road Upper directly to the Luas stop, allowing pedestrians to avoid the busy road junction. A lift provides step-free access from the northern end of the northbound platform to an open area at the side of the crossroads. This area was laid out so that bus services can connect with the Luas, and the entrance is marked with a sign of the same style as those on the platforms.

=== Service ===
Changing with the day, date and time, trams can range from running every 5 minutes to every 27 minutes and terminate at either Parnell or Broombridge in the north, and Sandyford or Brides Glen in the south.

== Onward transport ==
The stop is served by Dublin Bus routes 14, 44/b/d, 74, and L25, connecting the stop with areas such as Terenure, Rathgar, Stillorgan and Dún Laoghaire, as well as further destinations such as Rathmines, Kimmage, Harold's Cross and Glencullen. The stop is also served by Go-Ahead Ireland routes S6 and 161, providing connections to areas such as Templeogue, University College Dublin and Whitechurch, as well as further destinations such as Rockbrook, Blackrock and Firhouse. Dublin Coach operate route 750 connecting the stop with Dublin Airport.

== Accidents and incidents ==
- On 23 December 1957, two trains collided in thick fog just south of the station. The first train had slowed to a walking pace due to a cow on the line. The second train was mistakenly diverted into the same section of track due to an error by the signalman. Its driving cab was completely destroyed in the collision and the driver, Andrew Larkin, was killed instantly.

Preceding station	Luas	Following station
Windy Arbour towards Parnell or Broombridge	Green Line	Balally towards Sandyford or Brides Glen
Disused railways
Milltown; Line and station closed	Dublin and South Eastern Railway; Harcourt Street line	Stillorgan; Line and station closed
