= Harcourt Street station =

Former railway terminus in Dublin, Ireland

Harcourt Street Sráid Fhearchair
- The facade of Harcourt Street station, 1910

General information
- Location: Harcourt Street, Dublin
- Coordinates: 53.33345°N 6.26247°W
- Owner: CIÉ Railways Division
- Operator: CIÉ Railways Division
- Platforms: 1

Construction
- Structure type: At-grade

History
- Original company: Dublin, Wicklow and Wexford Railway
- Pre-grouping: Dublin and South Eastern Railway
- Post-grouping: Great Southern Railways

Key dates
- 7 February 1859: Station opened
- 1 January 1925: Station closes for goods traffic
- 1953: Services to Wexford, Waterford and Rosslare cease
- 31 December 1958: Station closed
- 30 June 2004: Luas stop opened outside station building
Location
- Location within Central Dublin

Harcourt Street railway station is a former railway terminus in Dublin. The station opened in 1859 and served as the terminus of the line from Dublin to Bray in County Wicklow. It closed in 1958 following the closure of the Harcourt Street line. Since 2004, there has been a Luas tram stop outside the front of the old station.

== History ==
The station opened on 7 February 1859, after the initial opening of the railway line itself.

The station facade was designed by George Wilkinson, and contains a central arch and a colonnade of doric columns. The station was constructed on an embankment, with the line 25 feet above street level and a Gilbey's bonded spirits store in the undercroft.

Although the line was double track, the station only had a single 597-foot-long (182 m) platform on the west side of the railway, which terminated in a 48'-diameter (14.6 m) turntable at the Hatch Street end of the station. There were two through sidings on the east side of the station, beyond which lay Harcourt Street goods station and the D&WR's locomotive shed. There was no direct access for arriving trains to the goods station, instead 'Up' Freight trains had to pull into the passenger station, then set back onto the 'Down' line before entering the goods station. This was a contributory factor to the 1900 train crash.

The first signal box was installed in 1878, and was replaced with an electro-mechanical installation in 1938 at which point the station was re-signalled with colour light signals.

The station is perhaps most famous for a train crash in 1900 - a cattle train from Enniscorthy failed to stop and crashed through the end wall of the station, leaving the locomotive suspended over Hatch Street. Nobody was killed, though the driver, William Hyland, had his right arm amputated. The locomotive was lowered down onto a temporary rail line on Hatch Street, and brought to the goods yard.

Following the accident, the Board of Trade recommended the installation of a facing junction to allow direct access to the goods line, and until that took place all trains were to stop at Ranelagh to ensure that they made a controlled approach to Harcourt Street station. This practice continued up to its closure.

After the formation of The Great Southern Railways in 1925, Harcourt Street gradually declined in importance as services to the South East were increasingly concentrated on Westland Row (now Pearse) station with goods facilities transferred to the North Wall goods station. Thereafter, apart from during the 1933 GNR(I) strike, Harcourt Street became predominantly a passenger station. Services to Wexford and Waterford were transferred to the coastal line in 1953, reducing the Harcourt Street line to commuter services and excursions. The station continued operating until 31 December 1958, when Córas Iompair Éireann, during its rationalisation programme of the railway network and amid some public criticism, closed the line from Harcourt Street.

The Luas light rail network that opened on 30 June 2004 utilised parts of the old route. The station building has been converted into a leisure venue with bars and music venues.

=== Liquor museum ===
In 1958, C.I.É. opened a liquor museum in the station basement. The exit was to the station refreshment room which was, unlike most other local licensed premises, permitted to sell alcohol in the holy hour between 2pm and 3pm if customers held tickets for distances over 12 miles, namely Bray and beyond. After closure, the museum was moved to the basement of Heuston Station in 1961.

== Harcourt Luas stop ==
Harcourt Sráid Fhearchair
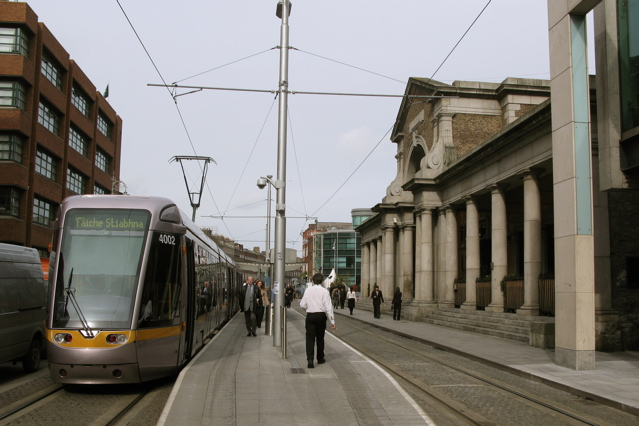
- View from the platform looking north. The station building is visible on the right.

General information
- Location: Harcourt Street, Dublin; Ireland
- Coordinates: 53.33364°N 6.26270°W
- Owner: Transport Infrastructure Ireland
- Operator: Luas
- Line: Green
- Platforms: 2 (island)
- Bus routes: 4
- Bus operators: Dublin Bus, Dublin Express
- Connections: 44; 44D; 82; 784

Construction
- Structure type: At-grade

Other information
- Fare zone: Central

Key dates
- 30 June 2004: Stop opened
- 2018: Platforms extended
Location

In June 2004, the Green Line of the Luas - Dublin's light rail tram system - opened. The Green line mostly followed the route of the old Harcourt Street line from Charlemont to Sandyford (it has since been extended south to Brides Glen). A stop called Harcourt was opened on the site of the old terminus. Because the embankment which led to the station had been demolished and replaced with new developments, the Luas line diverges from the old alignment at Charlemont and descends a ramp before continuing north on street level.

Harcourt Luas stop is directly in front of the entrance to the old station building. It has an island platform - a rarity for Luas stops - which is flanked by tracks running in lanes reserved for trams. Road traffic must travel on the western side of the street.

Preceding station	Luas	Following station
St Stephen's Green towards Parnell or Broombridge	Green Line	Charlemont towards Sandyford or Brides Glen
Disused railways
Terminus	Dublin and South Eastern Railway; Harcourt Street line	Rathmines & Ranelagh; Line and station closed

== Gallery ==
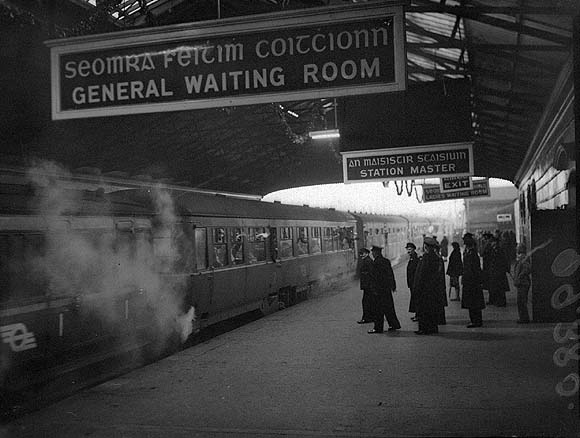
Last train before closure 31 December 1958

The Harcourt Street train crash, 1900

== See also ==
- Harcourt Street railway line
