= Charlemont Luas stop =

Tram stop in Dublin, Ireland

Charlemont
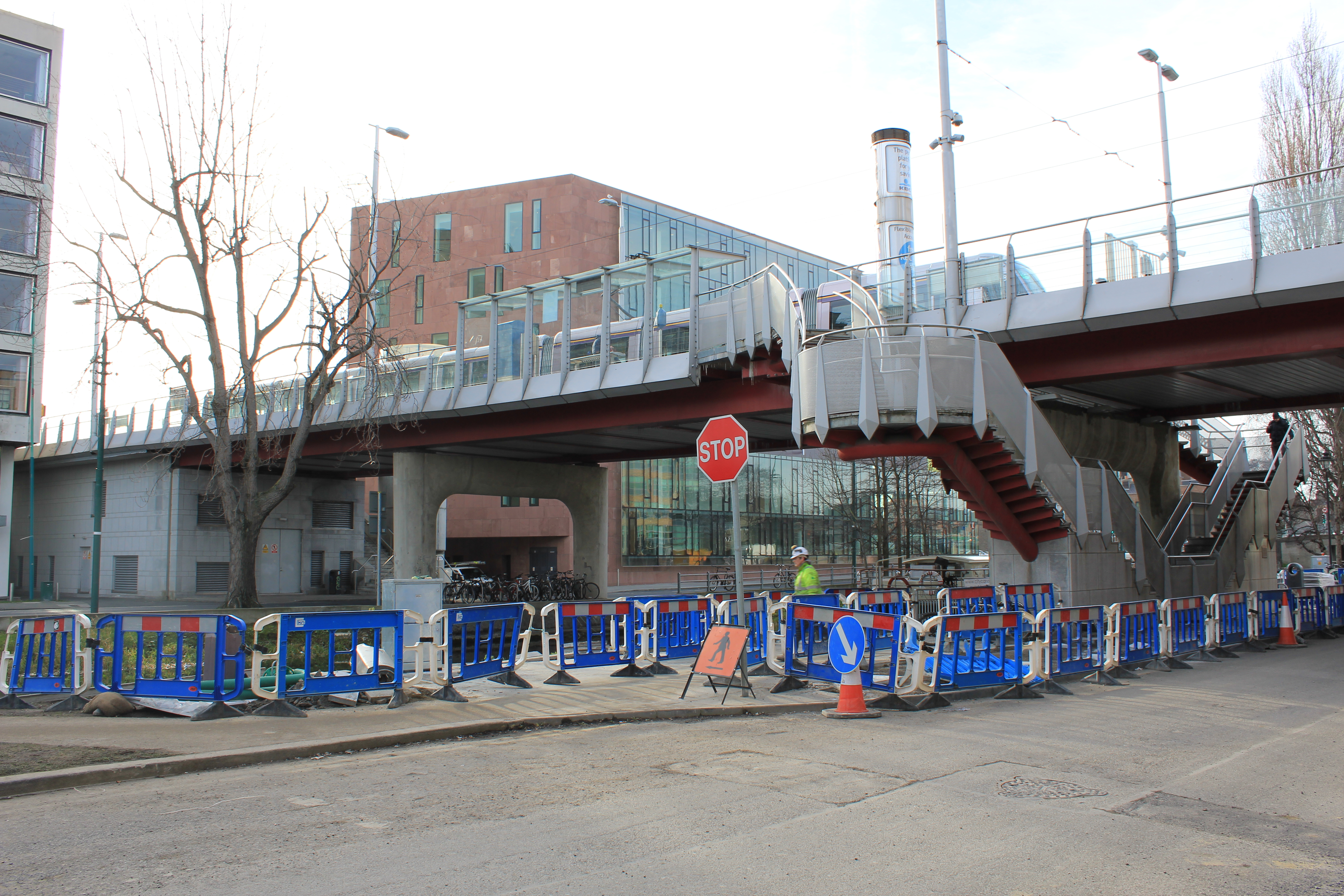
- Charlemont as seen from the north bank

General information
- Location: Grand Parade; Portobello, Dublin; Ireland
- Coordinates: 53°19′51″N 6°15′31″W
- Owner: Transport Infrastructure Ireland
- Operator: Transdev (as Luas)
- Line: Green
- Platforms: 2

Construction
- Structure type: Elevated
- Accessible: Yes

Other information
- Fare zone: Central/Green 2

Key dates
- 30 June 2004: Stop opened
- 2018: Platforms extended
Location
- Location within Central Dublin

Charlemont is a stop on the Luas light-rail tram system in Dublin, Ireland. It opened in 2004 on the Green Line from St Stephen's Green to Sandyford. It provides access to parts of the south inner city, including Portobello.

== Location and access ==
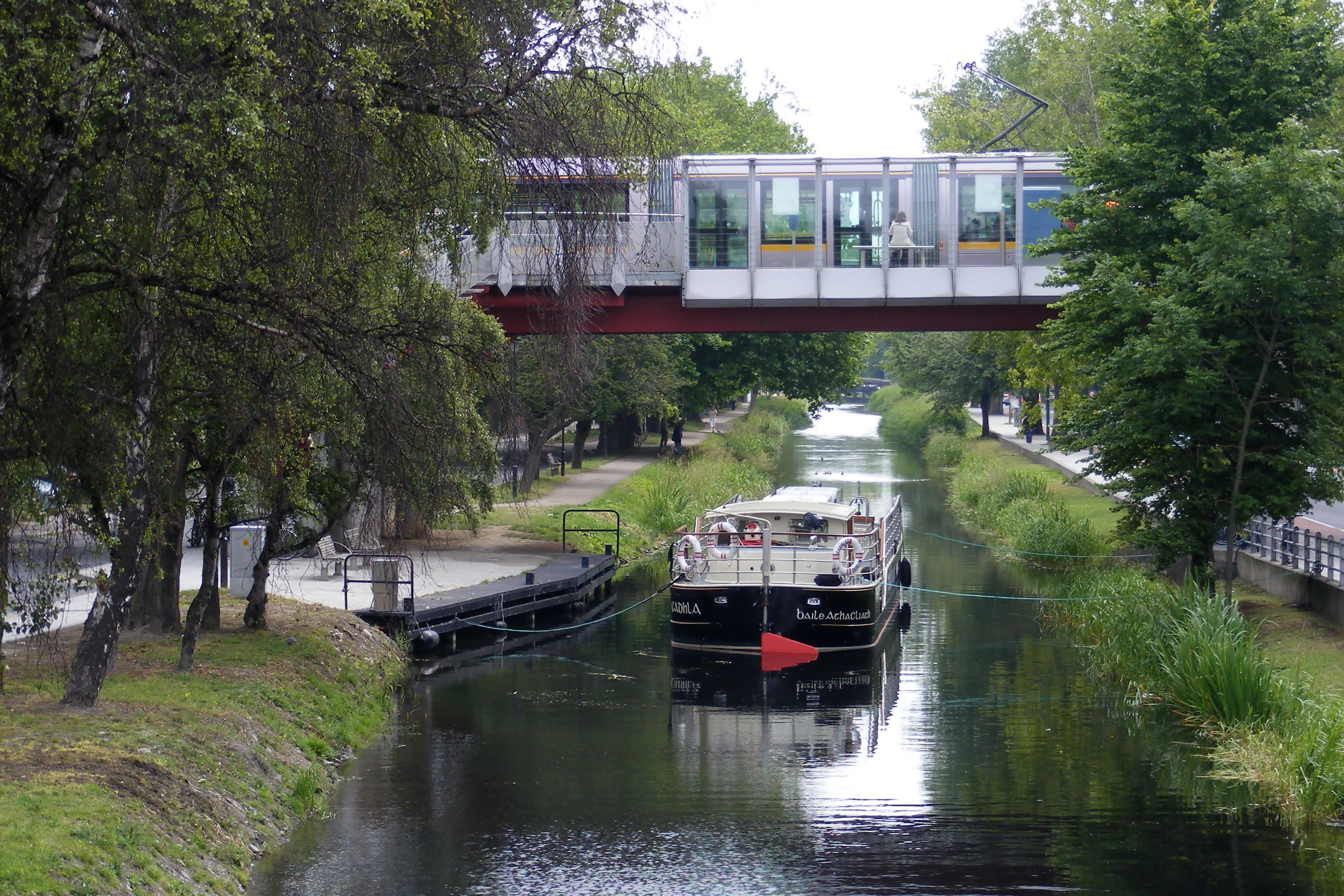
A tram stops at Charlemont stop above the canal

The platforms of Charlemont are located on a steel and concrete beam bridge which crosses the Grand Canal. The waiting shelters are located directly above the canal itself. The advantage of this layout is that the stop can be accessed from either side of the canal: on the south side, a staircase and lift lead from the Grand Parade to the northbound platform. On the north side, staircases lead from each of the platforms to Charlemont Place, but this end does not have step free access. Since the Luas does not have ticket barriers, the bridge can also be used by pedestrians to cross the canal. The bridge has been dedicated to Professor Simon H. Perry, a civil engineer who lead the campaign for a light railway in Dublin. The arrangement of a station on a bridge over water has since been implemented on a much larger scale at London Blackfriars station.

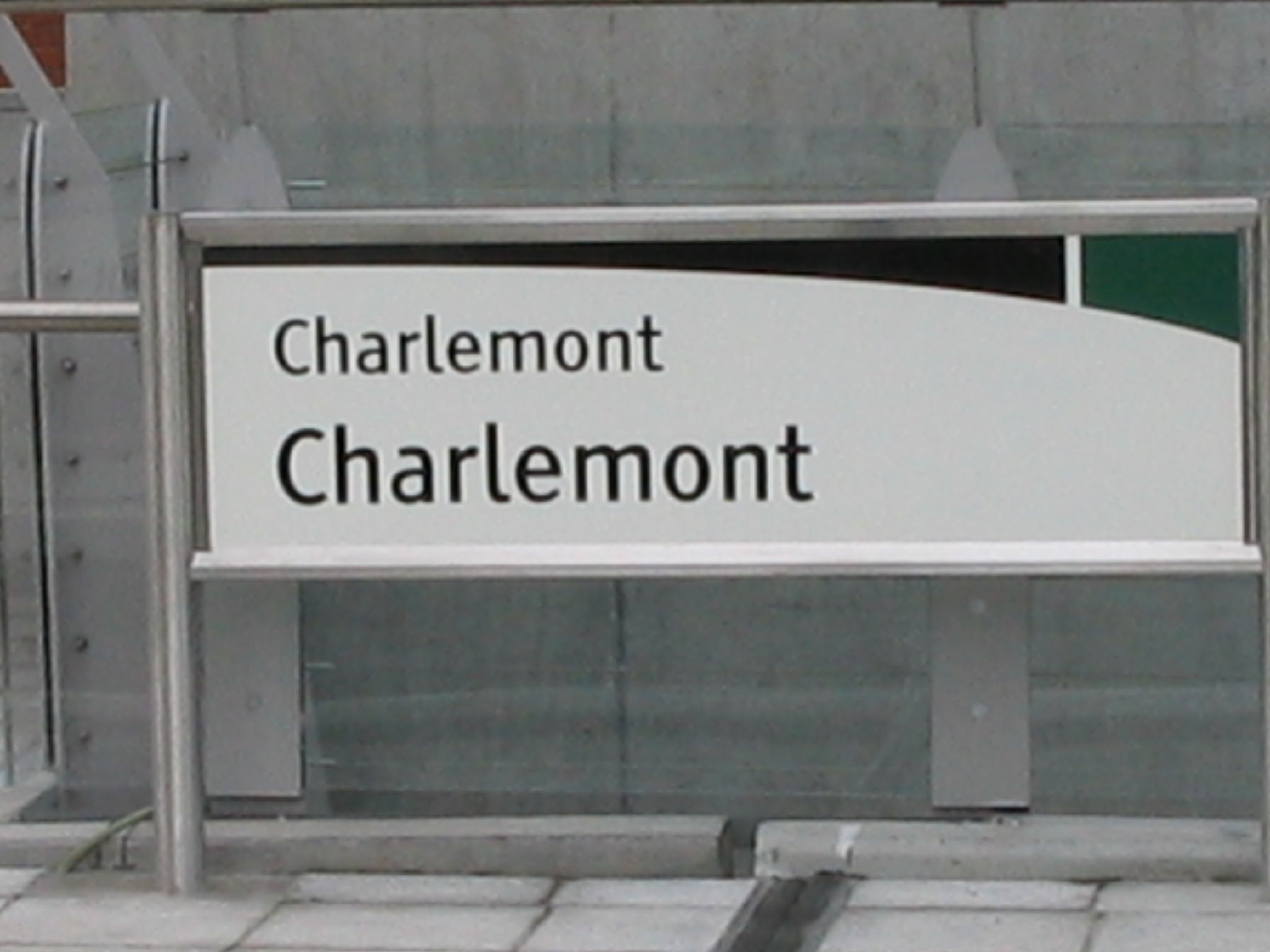
One of the platform signs

To the south of Charlemont, trams continue south on a viaduct built for the Harcourt Street railway line which ran along this alignment from 1854 to 1958. To the north, trams cross Charlemont Place and descend a ramp, continuing through the city centre on the streets.

== Services ==
Trams generally run every 5–10 minutes. Northbound trams either terminate at Parnell or continue to Broombridge. Southbound trams terminate at either Sandyford or continue to Brides Glen.

=== Bus connections ===
Charlemont is served by Dublin Bus routes 44, 44B and 61.

== Local features ==
Aside from parts of the south inner city, and the Grand Canal, Cathal Brugha Barracks, Dublin's Eye and Ear Hospital, and the Jewish Museum are located nearby.

== Proposed MetroLink station ==
In March 2018, the National Transport Authority (Ireland) (NTA) and Transport Infrastructure Ireland (TII) announced the preferred routing and stations for the planned Metrolink project. This plan proposed an underground metro station underneath Charlemont stop. Initially, the route was planned to extend further south to Sandyford, subsuming the Luas Green Line tracks from Charlemont down to its final destination in Sandyford. According to those plans, Luas services on the Green Line would cease between Sandyford and Charlemont, and be replaced by Metro services. In March 2018, public consultations were held and the plan met with considerable opposition regarding the potential closure of the Green Line for an undetermined amount of time and issues regarding pedestrian and cyclist permeability along the line. As a result, revised plans were published in March 2019, where the MetroLink line would be delivered in two phases, meaning the Green Line would not be upgraded during the first phase, but in a second (later) phase. By developing in two phases, the impact could be reduced and more time given to upgrading pedestrian crossings and underpasses. Other commentators have suggested "axing" the proposed Charlemont station altogether.

Preceding station	Luas	Following station
Harcourt towards Parnell or Broombridge	Green Line	Ranelagh towards Sandyford or Brides Glen
Proposed
Preceding station	Dublin Metro	Following station
St Stephen's Green	MetroLink	Terminus
