= St Stephen's Green station =

Stop on the Luas (tram) system in Dublin, Ireland

St Stephen's Green Faiche Stiabhna
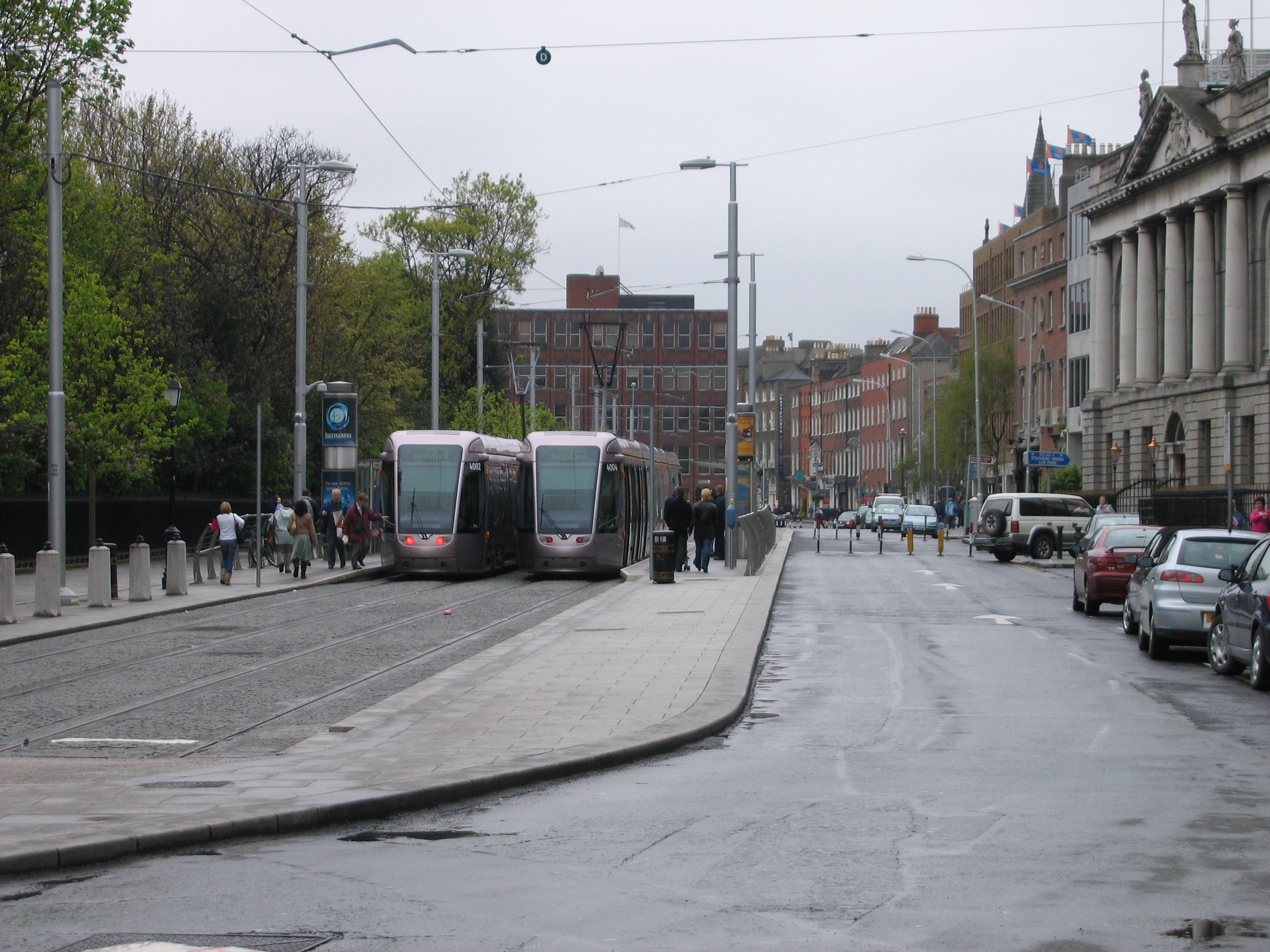
- Green Line trams at Stephen's Green West

General information
- Location: St Stephen's Green, Harcourt Street; Dublin; Ireland
- Coordinates: 53°20′21″N 6°15′40″W
- Owner: Transport Infrastructure Ireland
- Operator: Transdev (as Luas)
- Line: Green
- Platforms: 2

Construction
- Structure type: At-grade

Key dates
- 30 June 2004: Stop opened
- 2016: Stop upgrade begins
- 9 December 2017: Luas Cross City services commence
- 2018: Platforms extended
Location
- Location within Central Dublin

St Stephen's Green is a stop on the Green Line of the Luas (tram) system in Dublin, Ireland. Originally opened in 2004, it was further developed as part of the Luas Cross City project between 2013 and 2017.

== History ==
=== Initial Luas development ===
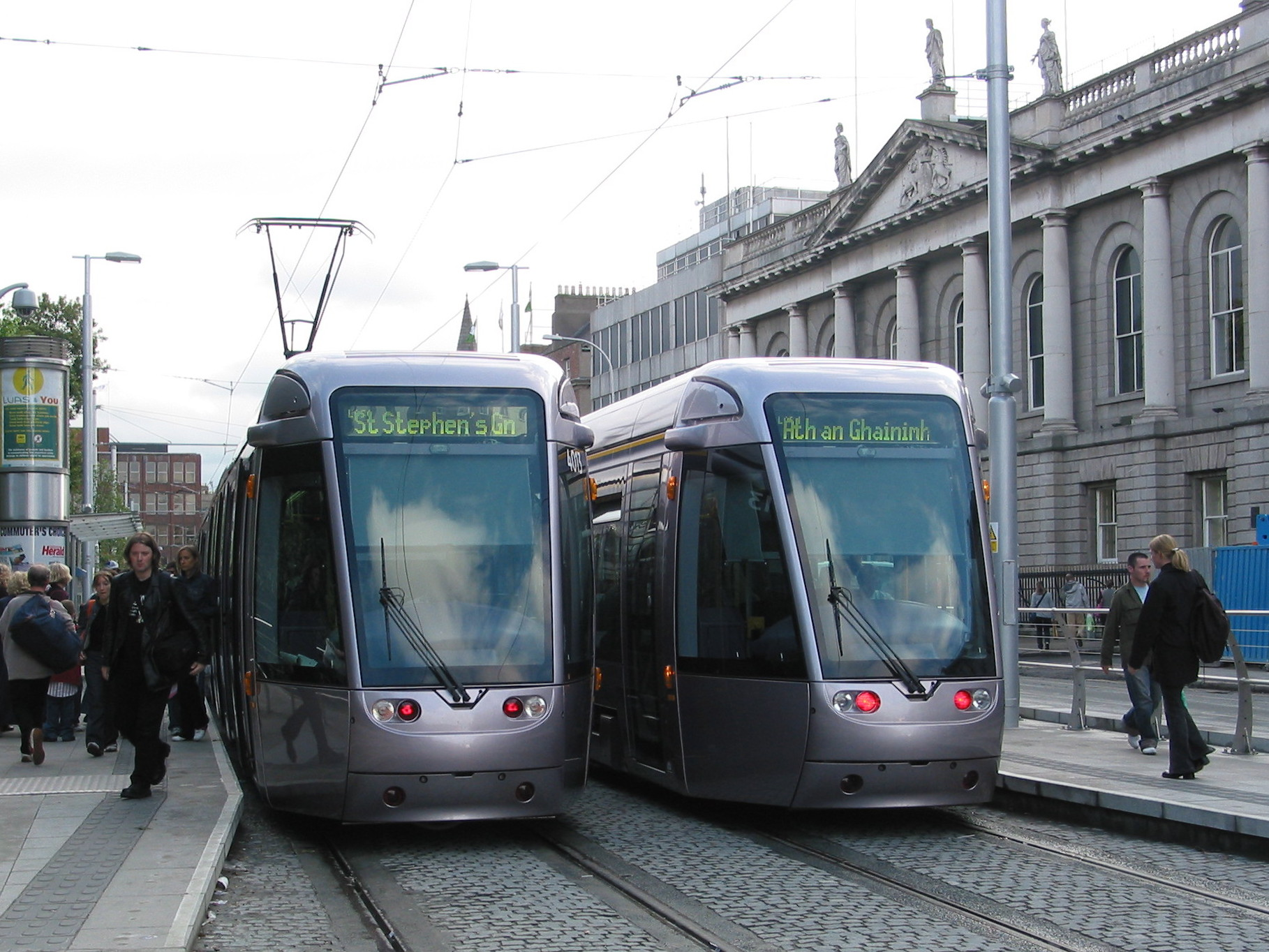
Luas (Typ Alstom Citadis 401) at St Stephen's Green stop

From the opening of the Luas Green Line in 2004 until December 2017, St Stephen's Green served as the northern terminus of the line to Sandyford and later Cherrywood, with a stop located on the western side of St Stephen's Green.

Trams approach the stop from the south, after coming up Harcourt Street. Immediately before the stop is a double crossover point which was used for terminating trams, but is now rarely used. After departing the stop, trams turn right and head along St. Stephen's Green North, where there is a siding, and then turn left onto Dawson Street.

=== Cross city extension ===
In 2017 an extension of the Luas Green Line was opened, crossing the River Liffey, and intersecting with the Red Line at the junction between O'Connell Street and Abbey Street, terminating at Broombridge, interconnecting with the Irish Rail Broombridge railway station. Named the "Luas Cross City line", this project was announced in 2011 as part of the government's 2012–16 Infrastructure and Capital Investment Plan. Construction work for the Rosie Hackett Bridge across the River Liffey began in April 2012, with this bridge carrying the southbound Luas Cross City track. The existing St. Stephen's Green stop on the Luas Green Line subsequently became a through-point for the new line, with the stop's platforms extended to accommodate the proposed introduction of longer trams in 2018. The extension opened on 9 December 2017, with the St. Stephen's Green stop remaining operational throughout the works.

== Proposals ==
Initial plans for the proposed Dublin Metro called for St Stephen's Green to be used as the southern terminus of a line to Belinstown, with a tunnel at the north-western corner of the park. While originally targeted for 2013, these plans were subsequently indefinitely deferred. Similar plans for a DART network extension proposed an underground station at St Stephen's Green. Though targeted to start in 2015, these works were also indefinitely deferred.

In March 2018, the Dublin Metro was rebranded under the name "Metrolink", and proposed to run from Swords in the north, passing through the city centre to points in the south. A version of this Metrolink plan proposed that an underground station be built on the Eastern side of St Stephen's Green.

Preceding station	Luas	Following station
Dawson towards Parnell or Broombridge	Green Line	Harcourt towards Sandyford or Brides Glen
Proposed
Preceding station	Dublin Metro	Following station
Tara Street	Metrolink	Charlemont
