= Harcourt Street railway line =

Railway line in Ireland

Harcourt Street Railway Line
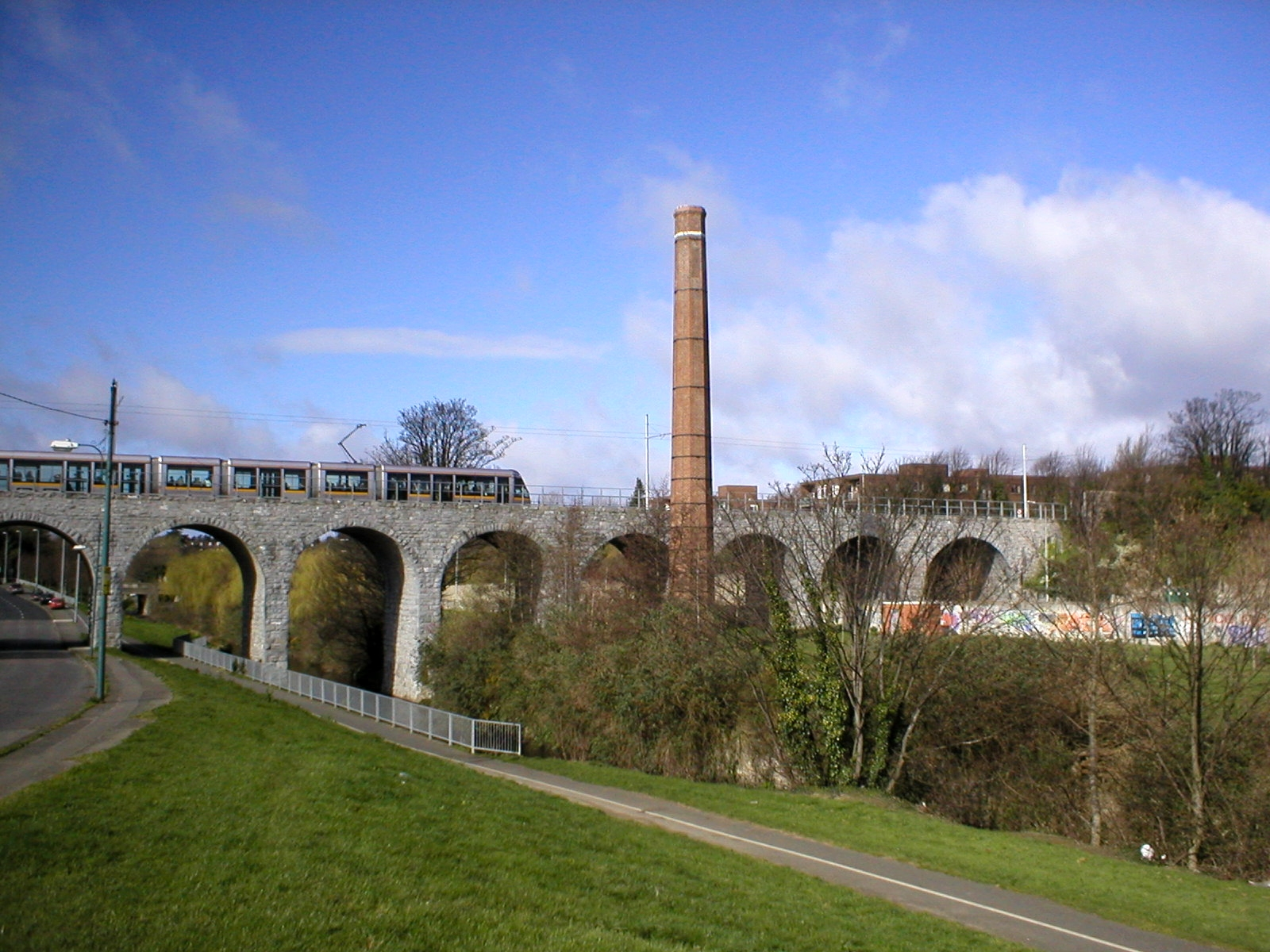
- The Nine Arches Viaduct over the River Dodder is now re-used by the Luas Green Line trams

Overview
- Status: Partly reused by Luas green line
- Owner: CIÉ Railways Division
- Locale: Dublin, Ireland
- Termini: Harcourt Street station; Bray station
- Stations: 10

Service
- Type: Commuter rail, Inter-city rail Heavy rail
- System: CIÉ Railways Division
- Operator: CIÉ Railways Division
- Depot(s): Harcourt St. Bray
- Rolling stock: Steam, Clayton steam railcars 1929, Drumm battery-electric 1932-1949, diesel rail cars 1954-1958

History
- Opened: 10 July 1854
- Closed: 31 December 1958

Technical
- Line length: 12.5-mile (20 km)
- Number of tracks: Double track
- Character: Tertiary
- Track gauge: 1,600 mm (5 ft 3 in) Irish gauge
- Electrification: Not electrified
- Highest elevation: 80m

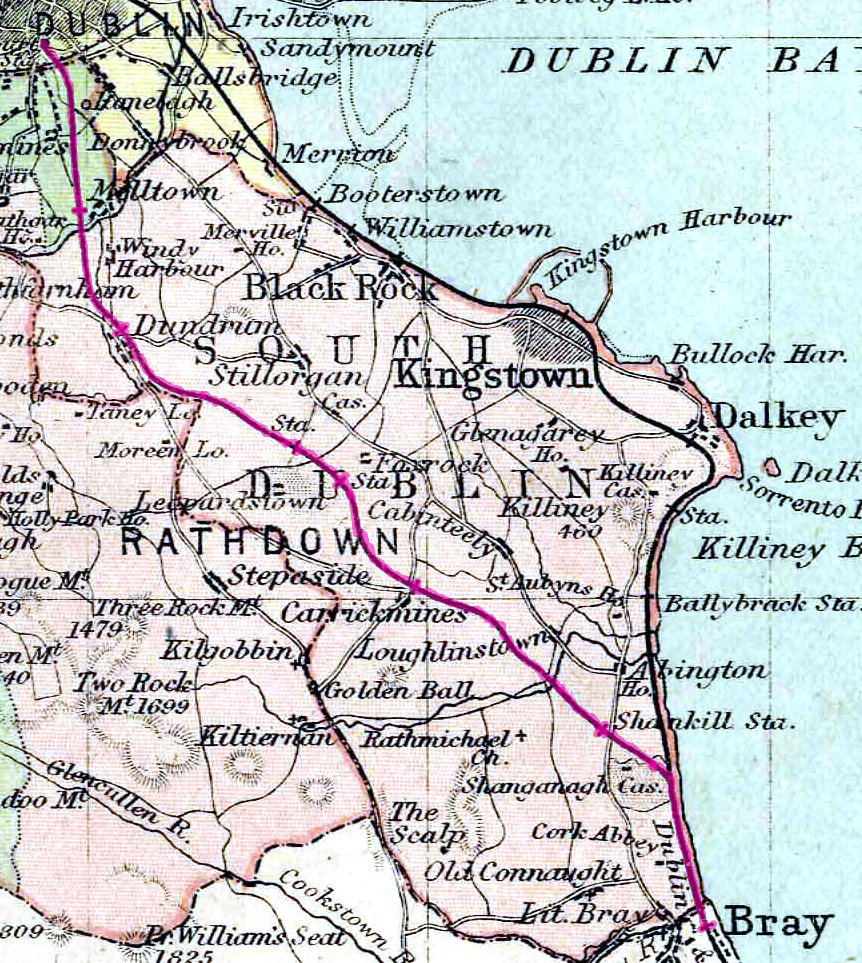
The line, in red, in 1887

The Harcourt Street Railway Line (Irish: Seanlíne Iarnróid Shráid Fhearchair) was a railway line that ran from Harcourt Street in Dublin through the southern suburbs to Bray. It was one of the Dublin and South Eastern Railway's two northern main lines, the other being the coastal line to Westland Row (which was formerly a branch line until 1902).

== History ==
Following the success of the Dublin and Kingstown Railway (D&KR), which opened on 17 December 1834, proposals for a second commuter railway to Dublin were put forward. These plans proposed the building of a 12.5-mile (20 km) railway from Bray, which opened on 10 July 1854 to initially terminate at Harcourt Road, before extending closer into the city centre. The building of the line was carried out by two railway companies: The Dublin, Wicklow and Wexford Railway (DW&WR), who were encouraged by the Great Western Railway, built the line from Dundrum to Bray and the Dublin, Dundrum and Rathfarnham Railway (DD&RR), who were to build the line from Harcourt Street to Dundrum, with a branch from Ranelagh to Rathfarnham. The latter failed to do so, and the DW&WR took over the line works.

The line opened with a single track line from Harcourt Road to Bray, with four intermediate stations at Dundrum, Stillorgan, Carrickmines and Shankill, with plans to extend into St Stephen's Green. By 1857, it was decided to instead build the terminus at Harcourt Street due to the cost of extending past the busy surrounding area. The new Harcourt Street station opened on 7 February 1859, along with a temporary platform at Foxrock.

Further new stations followed; Milltown (1860), Foxrock (1861) and Rathmines & Ranelagh (1896, more commonly known as Ranelagh), the latter was added to compete with the expanding services of the Dublin United Tramway Company.

On 14 February 1900, a train from Enniscorthy failed to stop and went through the buffers and the end wall of the station, sending debris over Hatch Street. Nobody was killed, though the driver, William Hyland, had his right arm amputated at the scene.

A halt opened past the junction at Woodbrook (1910), which served the cricket ground on Sir Stanley Cochrane's Woodbrook estate. The Woodbrook Golf Club and Cricket Grounds later used this halt between 1920 and 1960.

Drumm battery powered 2-car sets were in service between 1932 and 1949. In the 1950s, diesel railcars gradually replaced steam in an effort to improve journey times as many passengers had by then forsaken the line due to a significant increase in private car ownership. CIÉ were also rapidly expanding their then new bus services in and around the railway.

Another serious accident occurred on 23 December 1957 when two trains collided in thick fog just south of Dundrum station. The first train had slowed to a walking pace because of a cow on the line. The second train was allowed into the same section of track due to an error by the signalman. Its driving cab was completely destroyed in the collision and the driver, Andrew Larkin, was killed instantly.

The line was closed by CIÉ at the end of 1958 despite opposition from the community.

== Route ==
The 12.5-mile (20 km) route, which was double tracked by 1862, ran south, initially from a temporary terminus on Harcourt Road. It served the intermediate stations of Dundrum, Stillorgan, Carrickmines and Shankill, before being extended to Harcourt Street and the addition of further stations on the line.

The line initially met with the coastal line to Westland Row at a junction near the coast of Shanganagh until 1877 when the junction was reworked into a triple track section down to Bray. In 1915, due to coastal erosion, the Westland Row line was moved inland south of Killiney, joining the Harcourt St. Line at the new relocated Shanganagh Junction. The line continued to Woodbrook Halt as it reached Bray.

The summit of the line was at Lakelands between Dundrum and Stillorgan.

One of the major engineering feats on the line was the Milltown Viaduct, or Nine Arches, which still stands today over the River Dodder. The 5-arched Bride's Glen Viaduct spans the Loughlinstown River valley and Bride's Glen Rd.

The crash of 1900

Harcourt St. station, c. 1910

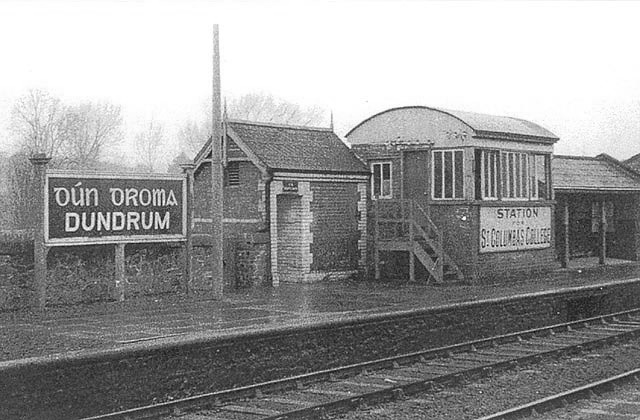
The up platform at Dundrum Station complete with a sign for St Columba's College on the signal box.

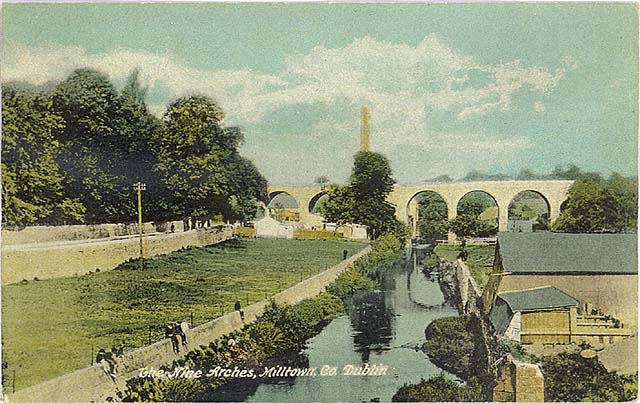
The Nine Arches Bridge as shown in a 1909 postcard.

== Decision to close ==
Following the Beddy Report of 1957, CIÉ decided to close all the non-profitable rural railway branch lines including the Harcourt Street line. In October 1958, CIÉ gave public notice of the closure. Many objections were raised by local people but to no avail. The last train, CIÉ 2600 Class AEC railcar number 2652, left Harcourt Street at 4:25pm on 31 December 1958. One interesting event that occurred was that when this train began crossing The Nine Arches Viaduct between Milltown and Dundrum, the staff of the nearby laundry turned out in force and blew sirens as the train crossed the viaduct for the last time. Following the closure, the route was taken over by the 86 bus route and The tracks were lifted following the Abandonment Order between 8 January 1959 and September 1960. The salvaged track was exported to India and many of the stations were sold by public auction, which totalled up to £150,000.

== Legacy ==
The route corridor remained mostly in place until the 2000s, largely due to the Dublin Corporation putting a ban on construction on the trackbed in 1972. The section between Grand Parade and the old Stillorgan station at Sandyford was chosen for use by the Luas light rail system whose Green Line opened in 2004. The line crosses the Dundrum bypass on the new William Dargan cable-stayed bridge.

An extension of the Luas to Cherrywood opened for passenger service on Saturday 16 October 2010, using most of the old railway alignment. The route leaves the old alignment after the Sandyford Depot, crosses the M50 motorway and runs down Ballyogan Road, before crossing the M50 again, and re-joining the original alignment before the Carrickmines station. The Railway Procurement Agency announced in 2009 that the Brennanstown stop would not open due to lack of local development. Beyond Brennanstown, the route diverges slightly from the old alignment and enters a new tunnel, before ending at the Brides Glen Luas stop in Cherrywood Business Park.

== Visible remains ==
Several bridges, stations and much of the alignment have survived. These include the Harcourt Street Station, Dundrum, Stillorgan, Carrickmines and Shankill stations, Woodbrook Halt, the Nine Arches and Bride's Glen viaducts. Little trace of Foxrock railway station remains as the building was demolished in 1991, other than the original passenger entrance to Leopardstown Racecourse beside the golf club main gates.

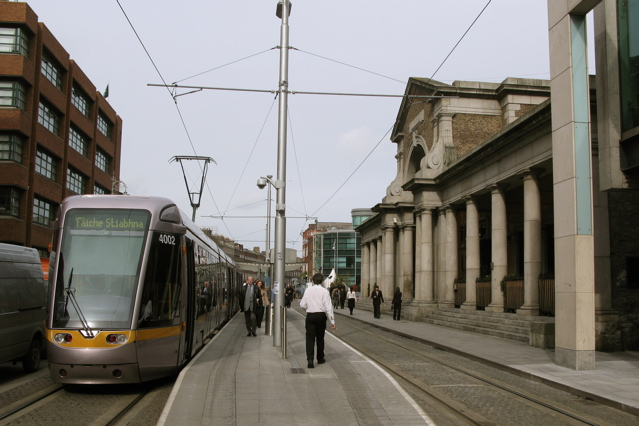
Harcourt Street terminus on the right, by George Wilkinson, 1858-59.

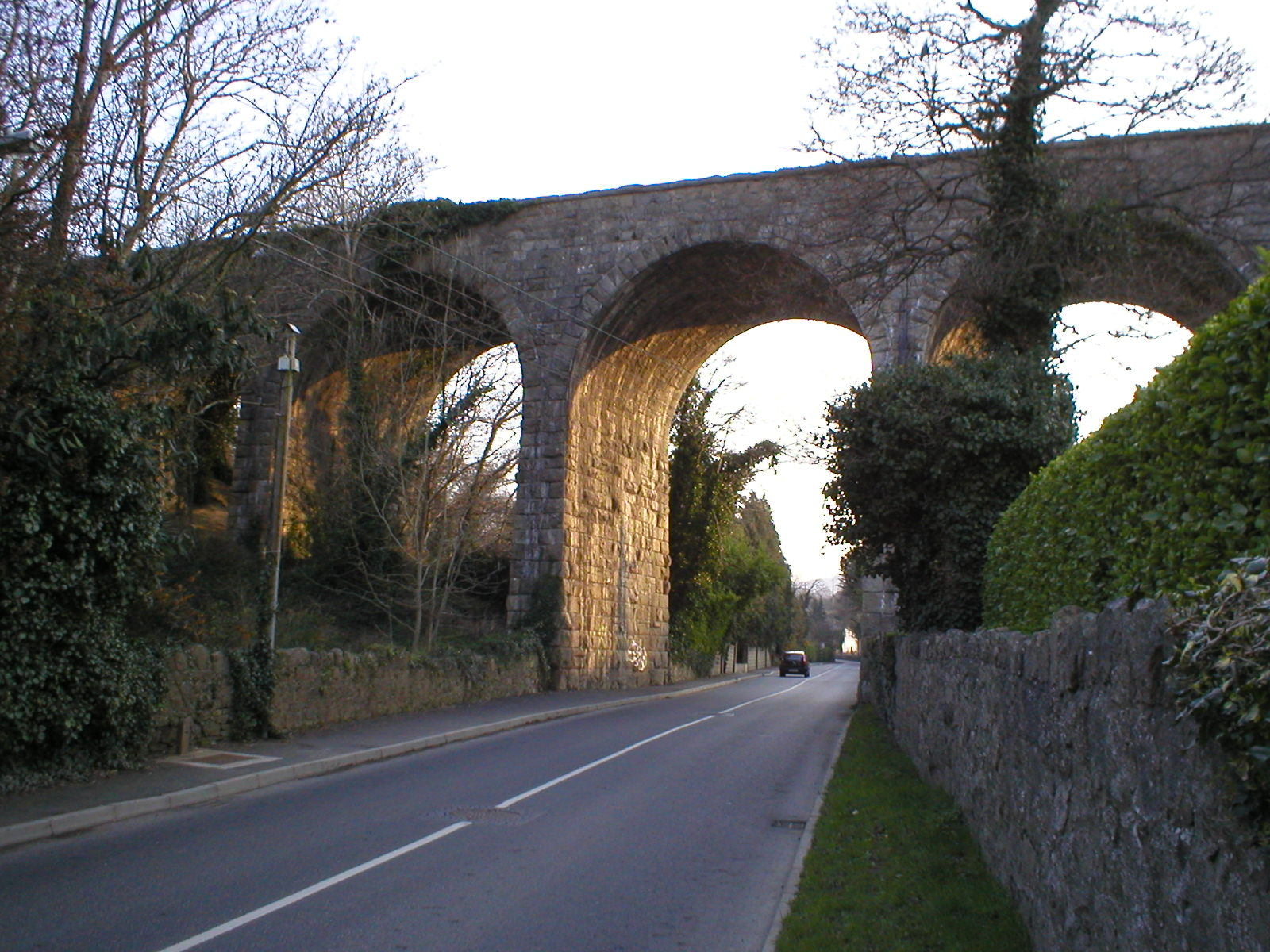
Bride's Glen Viaduct

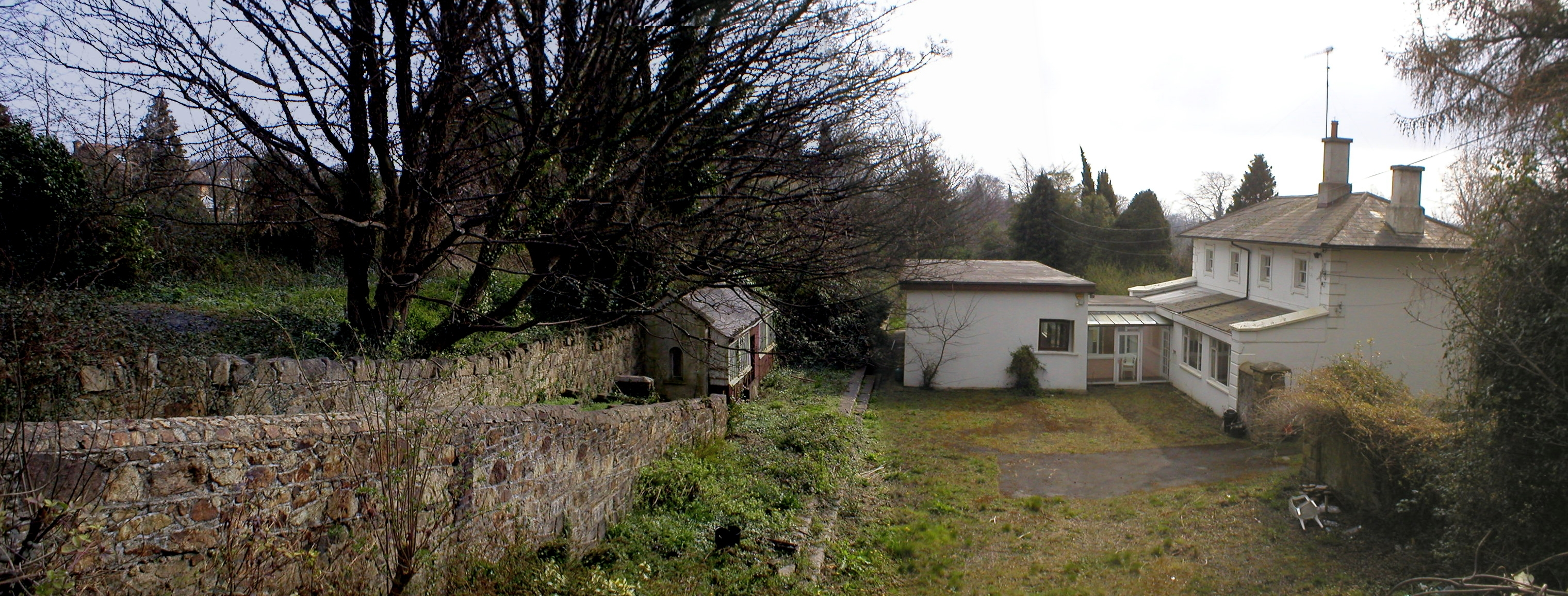
Carrickmines Station in 2007. The passenger access ramp, waiting room & the modern extension to the rear were later demolished as part of the Luas works.

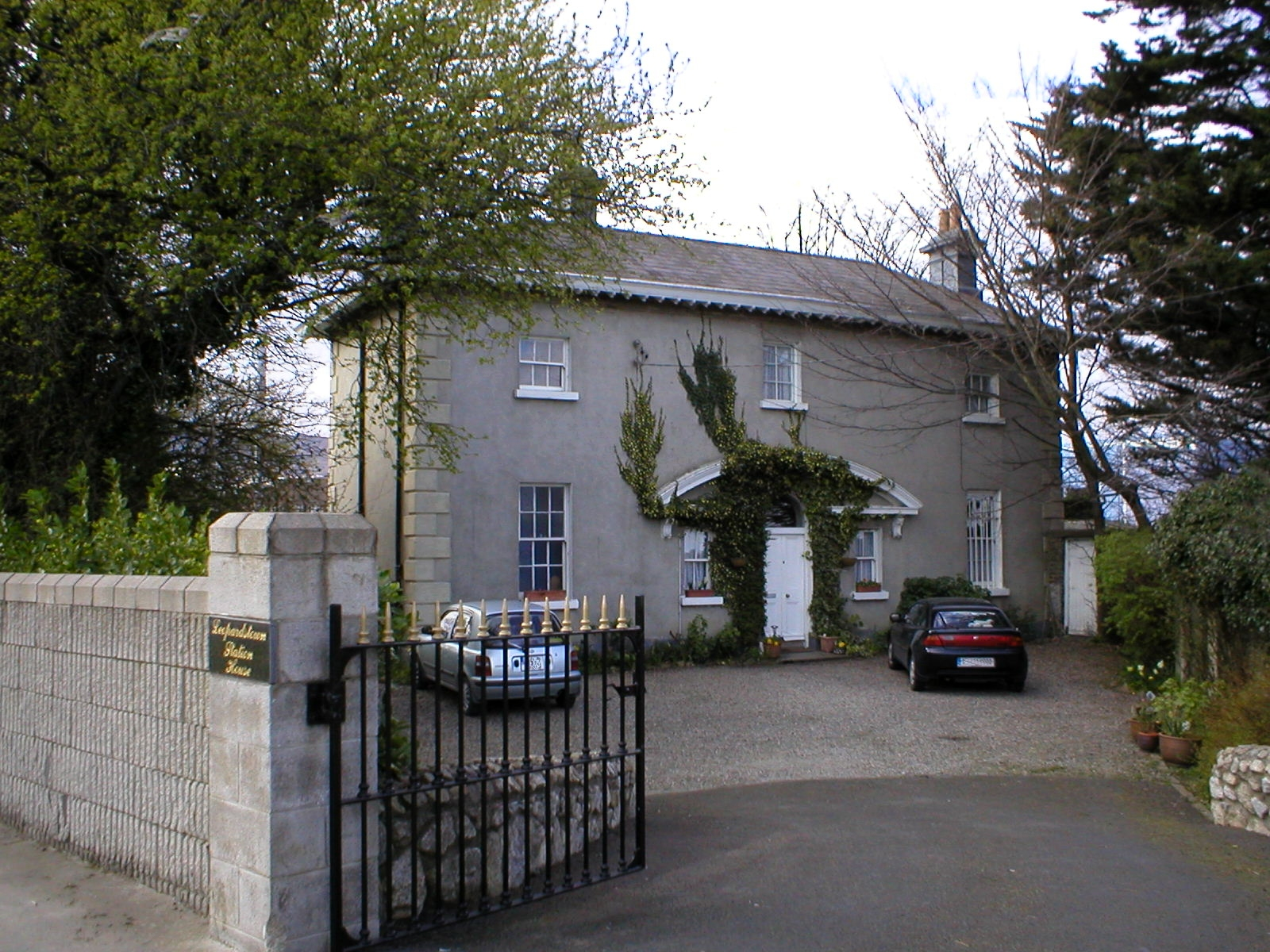
Stillorgan Station, now a private residence

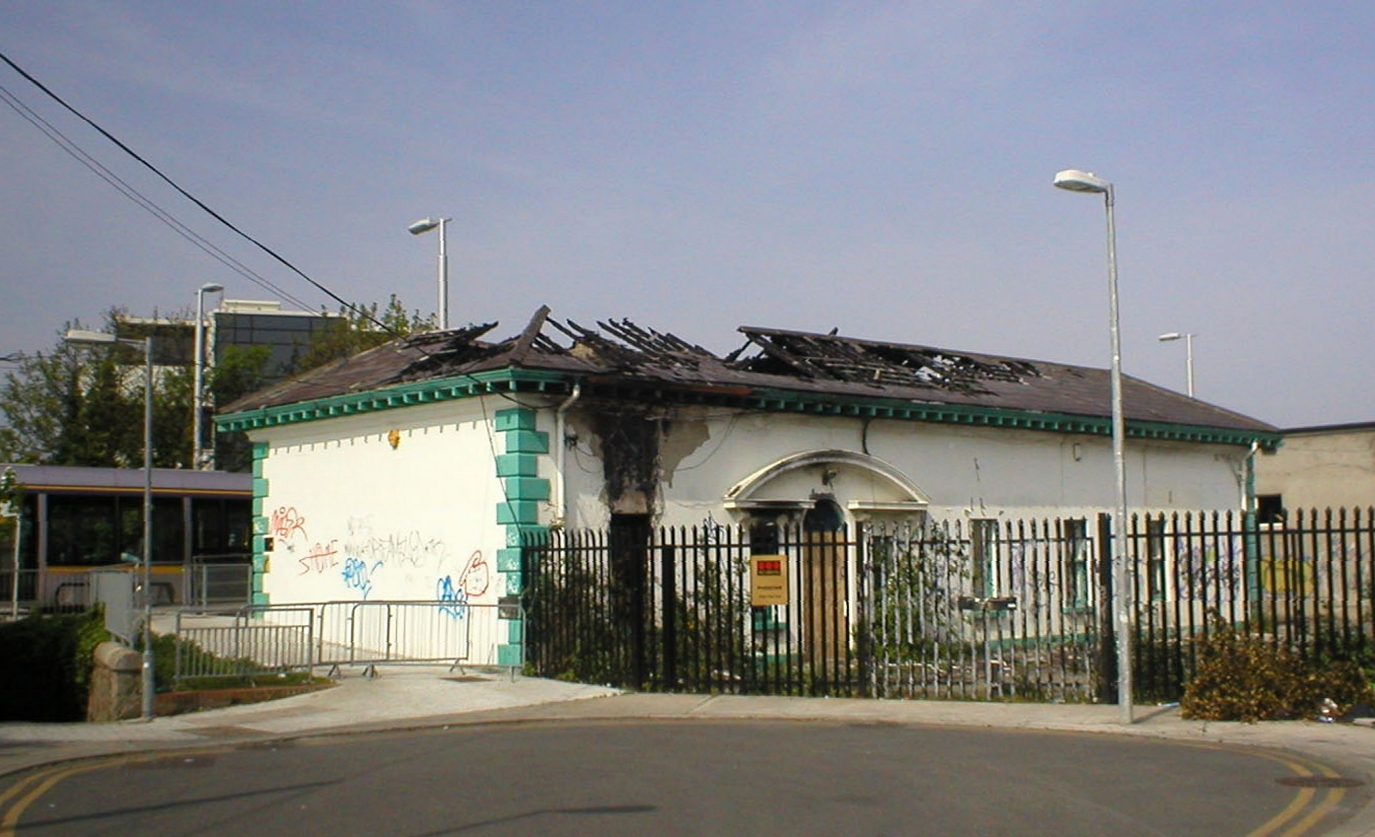
Dundrum Railway Station, still derelict as of 2008. The building has since been restored and is occupied by a shop as of 2020.

The new Sandyford Luas depot on the left & the old Stillorgan Station building, now a private residence, on the right. The line ran through the centre of the picture

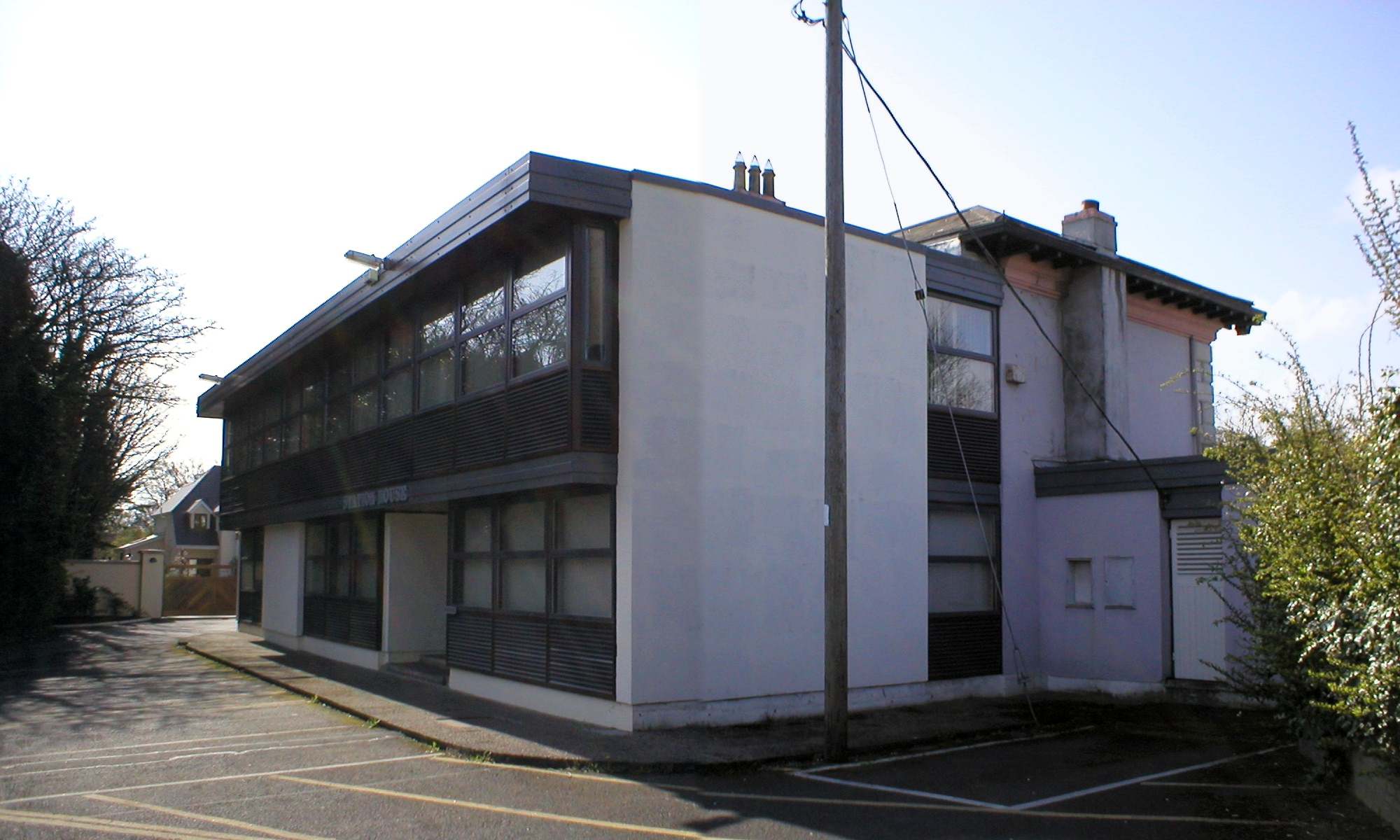
Shankill Station, to rear of modern office addition

== See also ==
- Harcourt Street railway station
- History of rail transport in Ireland
- Portobello
