= Sandyford Luas stop =

Tram stop south of Dublin

Sandyford Áth an Ghainimh
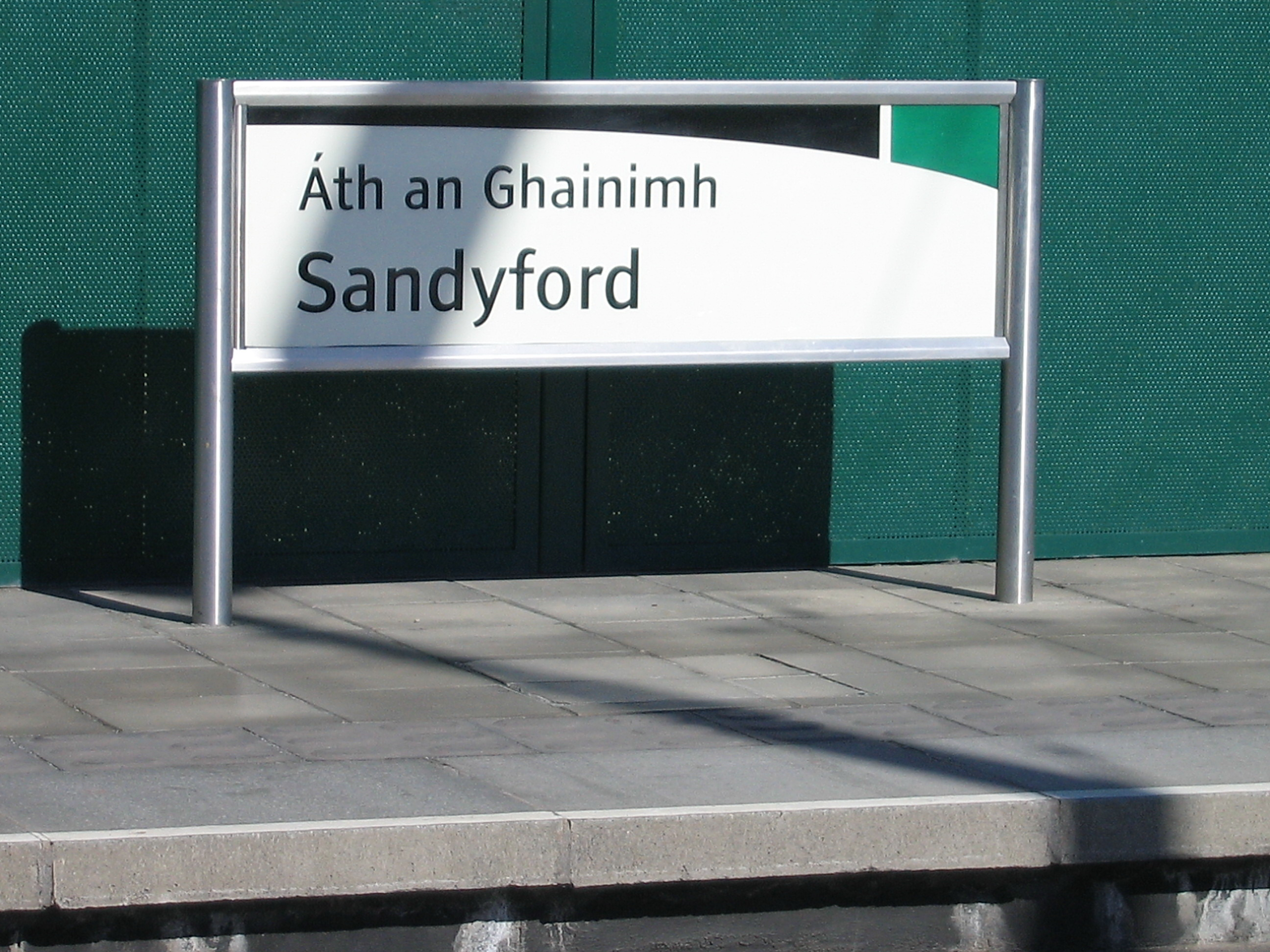
- The platform sign at Sandyford

General information
- Location: Brewery Road (original railway station); Blackthorn Avenue (current tram stop); Stillorgan/Sandyford, County Dublin; Ireland
- Coordinates: 53°16′39″N 6°12′17″W
- Owner: Transport Infrastructure Ireland
- Operator: Transdev (as Luas)
- Line: Green
- Platforms: 3
- Bus routes: 11, 47, 114, 116, 118, 700, S8
- Bus operators: Dublin Bus, Go-Ahead Ireland, Aircoach

Construction
- Structure type: At-grade

Other information
- Fare zone: Green 3/4

Key dates
- 10 July 1854: Station opens as Stillorgan
- 1937: Station closes to goods traffic
- 13 December 1951: Station reduced to a halt under Foxrock
- 31 December 1958: Station closes
- 30 June 2004: Luas stop opens near station as Sandyford
- 2018: Platforms extended
Location
- Location within Dublin

Sandyford (Irish: Áth an Ghainimh) is a stop on the Luas light rail tram system in Dún Laoghaire–Rathdown, south of Dublin, Ireland which serves the nearby suburb of Sandyford. It opened in 2004 as the southern terminus of the Green Line, which re-uses the alignment of the Harcourt Street railway line which closed in 1958. Sandyford Luas stop is located on the same site as a station on the old line called Stillorgan.

== History ==
=== Railway station (1854–1958) ===
The Harcourt Street railway line was opened by the Dublin and Wicklow Railway in 1854, running from a temporary terminus at Harcourt Road near the city centre to Bray. Stillorgan was originally one of four intermediate stops on the line along with Dundrum, Carrickmines and Shankill. The station was located on Brewery road, which the line crossed under a road bridge. There was a station building on the down platform (for trains towards Bray), and a small waiting room on the up platform. Passenger access between the platforms was via an iron footbridge. There was also a signal box a short distance up the line.

=== Closure (1959-2004) ===
The Harcourt Street line had declined in use throughout the early 20th century and was becoming rundown in the 1940s and 50s. Stillorgan did not see much traffic in the 50s, largely due to it being over a mile from Stillorgan village. As a result of the decrease in traffic, the station was reduced to a halt under Foxrock in December 1951. After the line continued to dwindle in use, it was closed by CIÉ at the end of 1958, much to the objection of the community. The tracks were lifted soon after and all stations on the route were auctioned off. Stillorgan station building became a private residence. The platforms and bridges were later demolished and the signal box fell into disuse.

=== Luas (2004-present) ===
Construction of the first phase of the Luas system commenced in 2001 and concluded in 2004. The route chosen for the Green Line re-used the old Harcourt Street alignment between Charlemont and Stillorgan. The terminus stop which was built on the site of the old Stillorgan is called Sandyford (a separate stop called Stillorgan was built around 500m up the line). The stop was built with two side platforms and a crossover to allow trams to turn back. The depot for the Green Line was built immediately beyond the stop.

In 2010, the Green Line was extended south to Brides Glen. After Sandyford, the line diverges from the old Harcourt Street route in order to serve some more populous areas on the Ballyogan Road, and re-joins it just before Carrickmines. A third platform was built at Sandyford.

In 2018, the platforms were lengthened from 45 to 55 metres, and the depot was significantly upgraded. This was to accommodate the new longer trams introduced to boost capacity.

It is anticipated that Sandyford will be the southern terminus of MetroLink after the Green Line between Charlemont and Sandyford is converted to metro standard to increase capacity.

== The stop today ==
Sandyford stop has ticket machines, shelters, displays, and signage of the same design as other Luas stops. One platform is bound by a steel railing, the other by a sandstone wall. The old signal box can still be seen just to the north of the stop.

Sandyford is one of very few Luas stops with three platforms. On the side adjacent to the former Stillorgan reservoir, there is an edge platform used for trams coming from the north and continuing to Brides Glen. There is an island platform for trams travelling northwards. The track nearest to the road is for trams which have come from Brides Glen, and the middle track is for terminating trams. The main entrance is a series of steps and ramps which lead from a plaza at the side of the adjacent Blackthorn Avenue to passenger crossings across the tracks. In addition, a pathway leads from the side platform, past the depot, to Brewery Road, adjacent to the old station building, which remains a private residence.

The stop has a Park and Ride facility with 47 spaces, of which 4 are for disabled badge holders and 2 allow for the charging of electric vehicles. In addition, the car park at Stillorgan stop has 341 spaces, some of which are physically closer to the platforms at Sandyford. The car park has entrances to both stops.

=== Service ===
Northbound trams run every 5–10 minutes and either terminate at Parnell or continue to Broombridge. Roughly half of the southbound service terminate at the stop, with the remainder continuing south to Brides Glen.

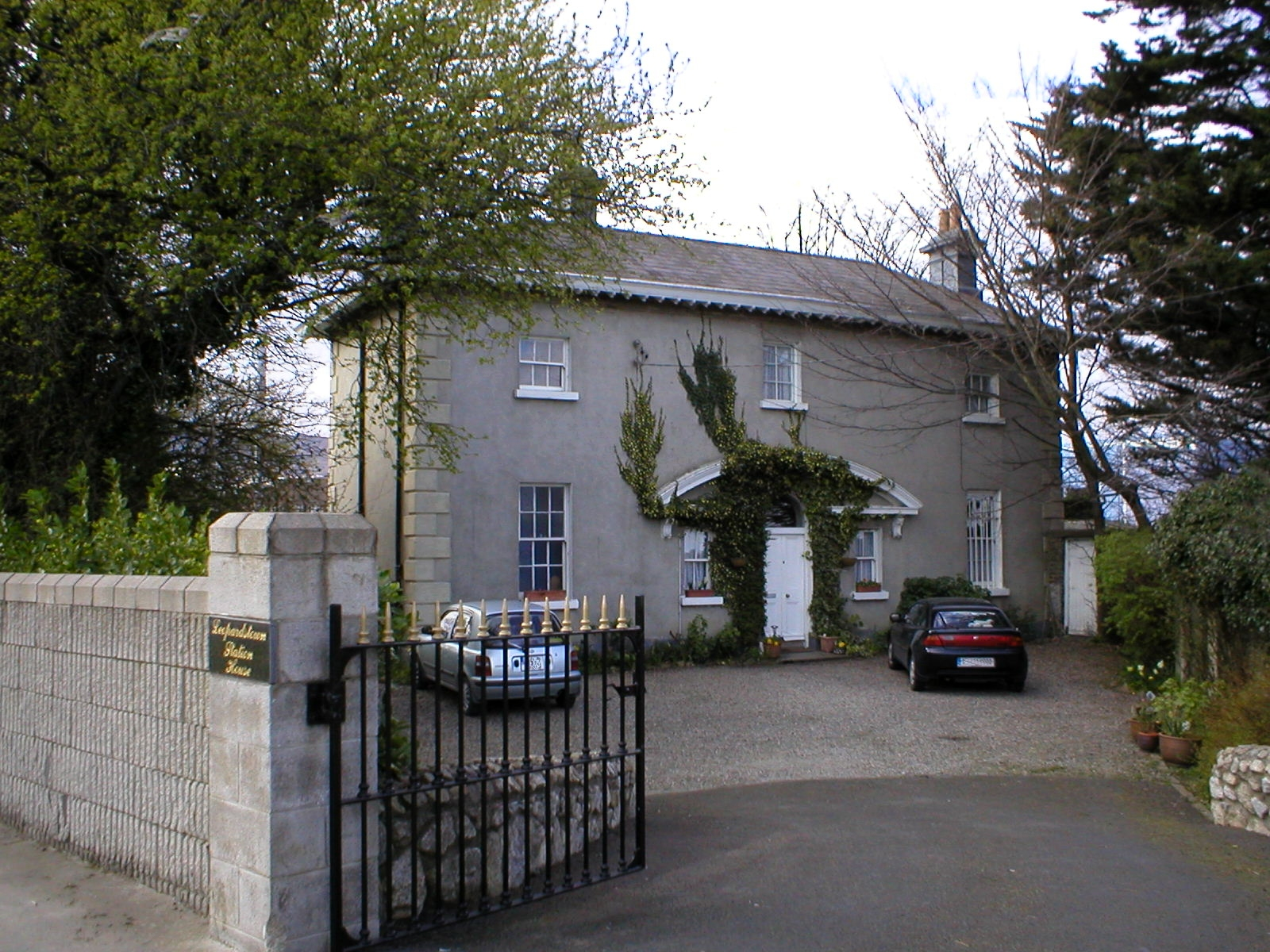
The old station building

== Onward transport ==
The stop is served by Dublin Bus routes 11, 47, 116 and 118, providing connections to Stepaside and Belarmine, as well as further destinations such as Stillorgan and University College Dublin. In addition, Go-Ahead Ireland routes S8 and 114 serve the stop, providing connections with Marlay Park, Ballinteer, Dún Laoghaire and Blackrock. Aircoach route 700 connects the stop with Dublin Airport. Finnegan Bray route 143 connects the stop with Bray.

Preceding station	Luas	Following station
Stillorgan towards Parnell or Broombridge	Green Line	Terminus
Stillorgan towards Parnell or Broombridge	Green Line	Central Park towards Brides Glen
Disused railways
Dundrum; Line and station closed	Dublin and South Eastern Railway; Harcourt Street line	Foxrock; Line and station closed

== Accidents and incidents ==
- In February 1869, a young man named John Laughton was killed while crossing the tracks at the station.

== Gallery ==
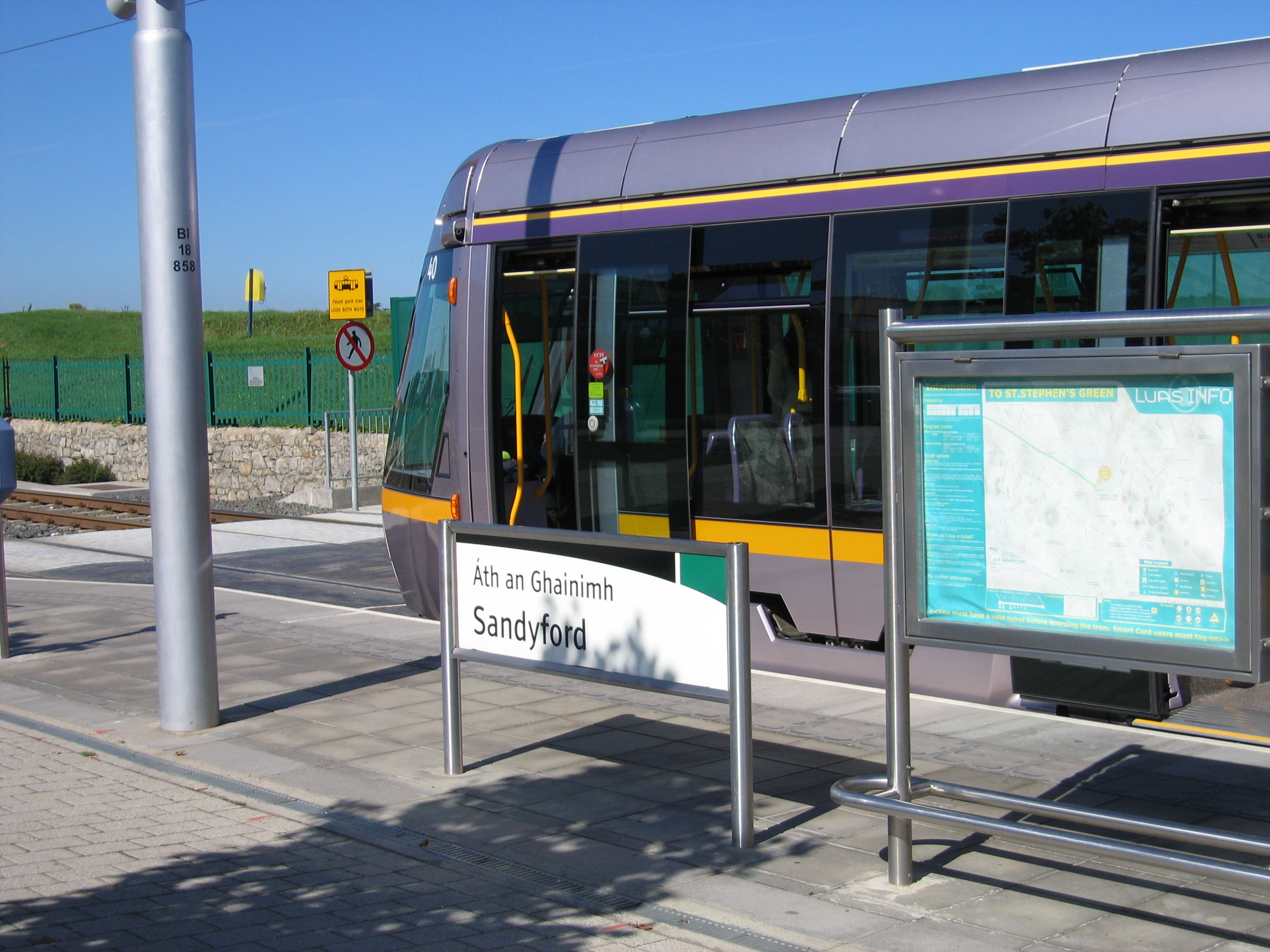
A tram waits to depart at Sandyford

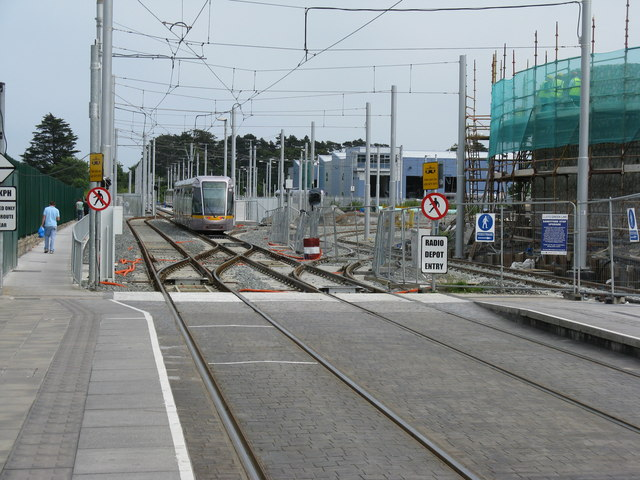
Looking south from the platforms into the depot.

The depot, with the station building on the right. The pathway leads to the platforms.

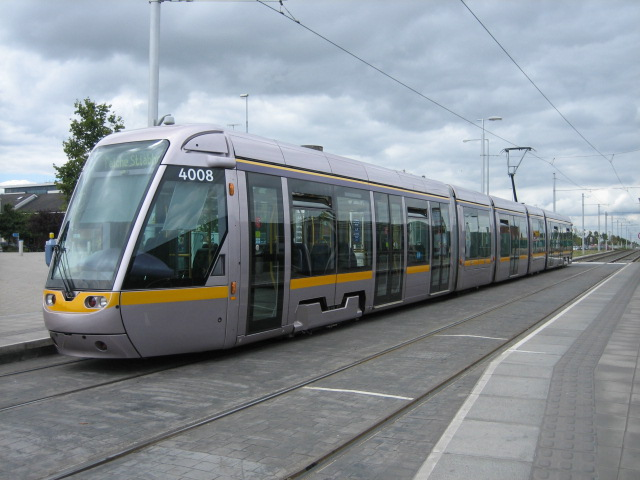
Looking north from the stop in 2006.

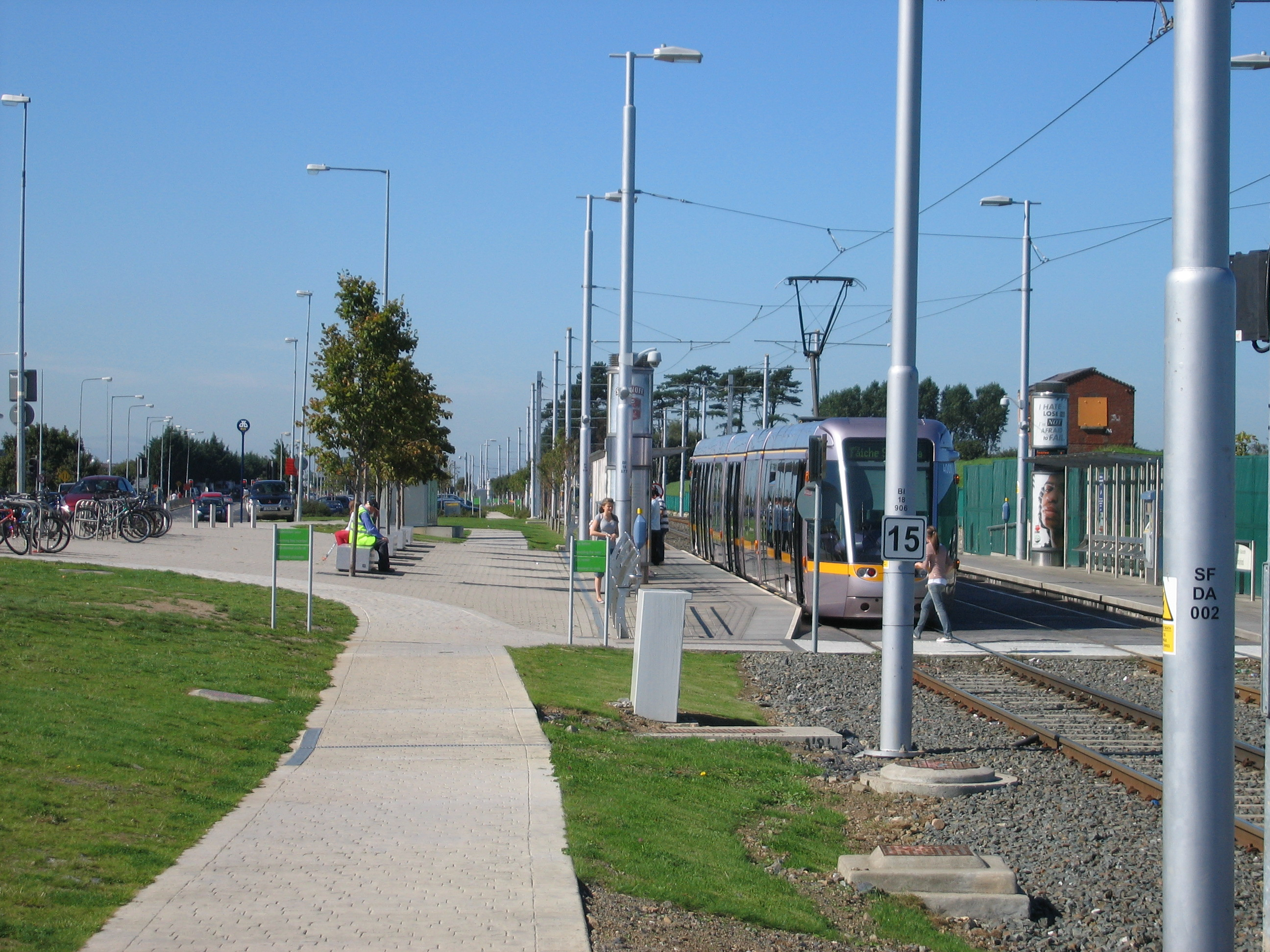
Also in 2006. The platform at which the tram is seen was then an edge platform integrated with the street; it has since become one side of an island platform. The old signal box can also be seen.
