= Parnell Luas stop =

Tram stop in Dublin, Ireland

Parnell
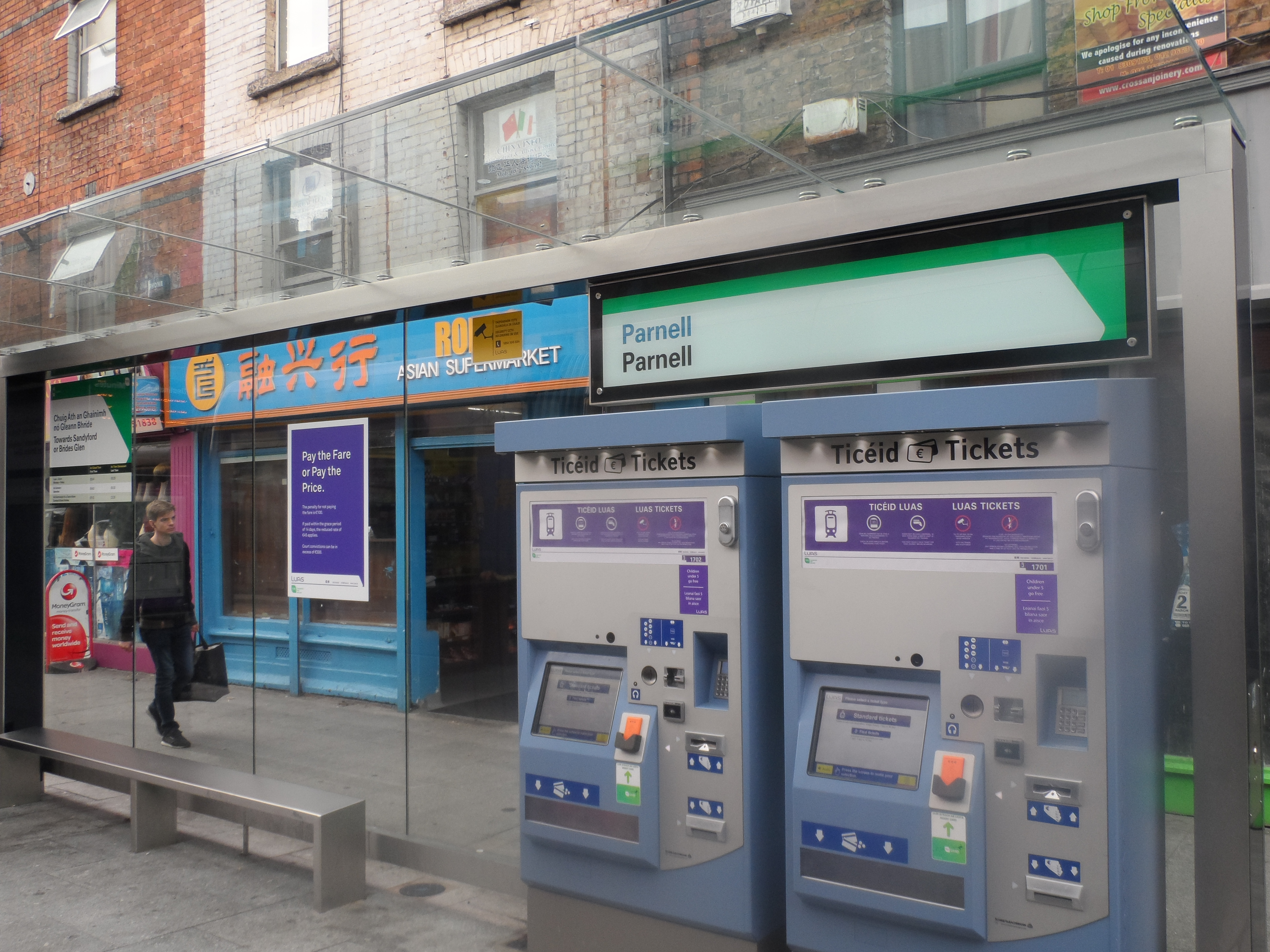
- Close-up of the shelter at Parnell

General information
- Location: Parnell Street; Dublin; Ireland
- Coordinates: 53°21′11″N 6°15′38″W
- Owner: Transport Infrastructure Ireland
- Operator: Transdev (as Luas)
- Line: Green
- Platforms: 1

Construction
- Structure type: At-grade

Other information
- Fare zone: Central

Key dates
- 9 December 2017: Stop opened
Location
- Location within Central Dublin

Parnell is a stop on the Luas light-rail tram system in Dublin, Ireland. It opened in 2017 as a stop on Luas Cross City, an extension of the Green Line through the city centre from St. Stephen's Green to Broombridge and is sometimes the northern terminus for many services. It is located on Parnell Street between the intersections with O'Connell Street and Marborough Street, near the Parnell Monument and provides access to the Gate Theatre, the James Joyce Centre, the Hugh Lane Gallery, the Dublin Writers Museum, and Mountjoy Square.

== Location ==
Parnell's single platform is located to the north of the tracks, integrated into the pavement. It is the most northerly stop on the one-way system at the centre of the green line. To the east of the stop is a junction where the two tracks meet and head north on their way from Brides Glen to Broombridge. However, trams which originate at Sandyford turn right at this junction, turning back the way they came; these trams display "Parnell" on their destination boards.

Preceding station	Luas	Following station
Dominick One-way operation	Green Line	Marlborough towards Sandyford or Brides Glen
Terminus	Green Line	Marlborough towards Sandyford or Brides Glen

== Incidents ==
- A Luas tram was set on fire outside the stop on 23 November 2023 amid an anti-immigrant riot in Dublin city centre following a protest surrounding the stabbing of 5 civilians outside a primary school earlier that day.
