= Broombridge railway station =

Station in Dublin, Ireland

Broombridge Droichead Broome
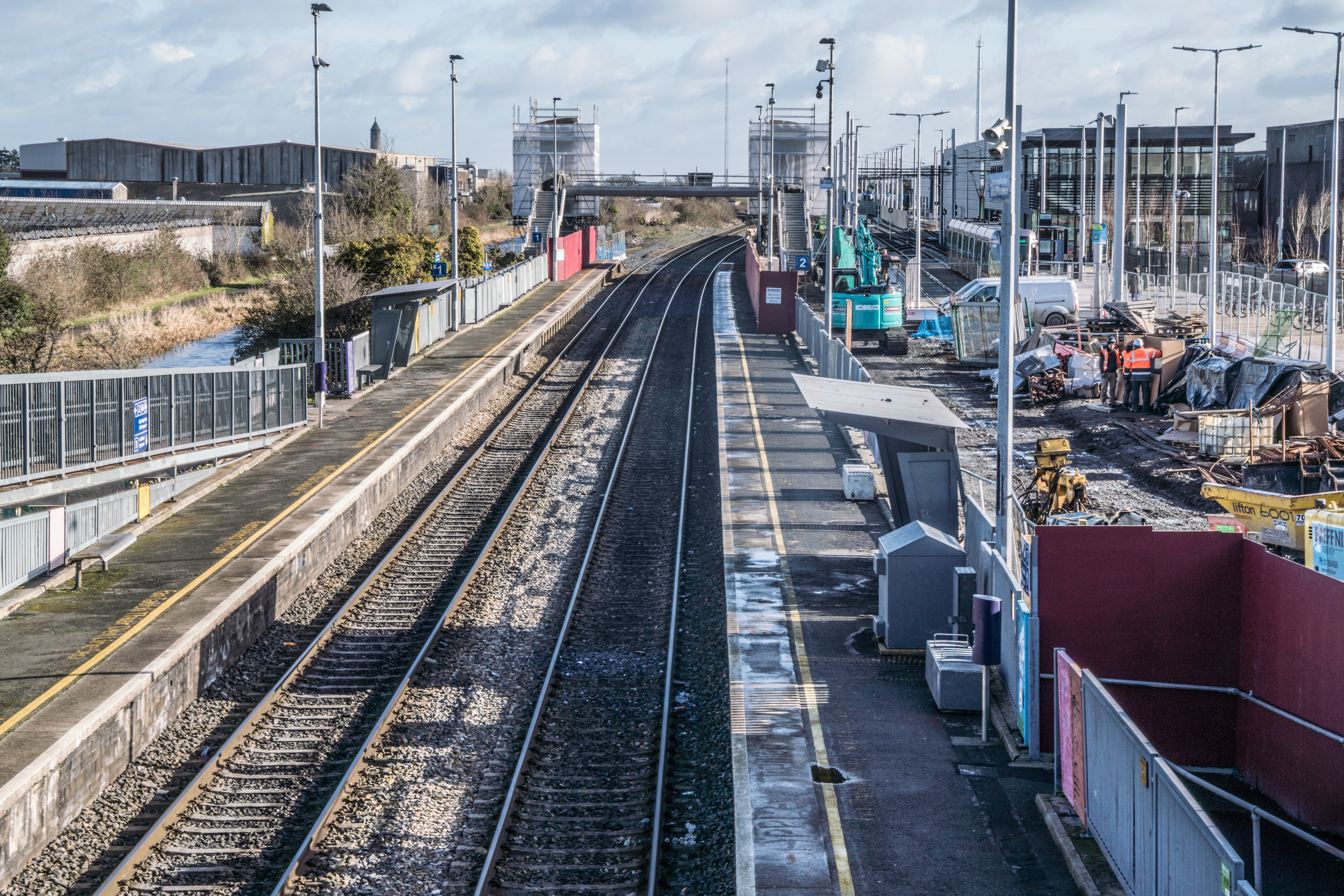
- Improvement in progress in February 2018 with the LUAS to the right and the Royal Canal on the left

General information
- Location: Broombridge Road, Cabra; Dublin; Ireland
- Coordinates: 53.3727°N 6.2995°W
- Owner: Iarnród Éireann
- Operator: Iarnród Éireann
- Platforms: 2 (heavy rail); 2 (Luas)
- Tracks: 2
- Bus operators: Go-Ahead Ireland; Dublin Bus
- Connections: 40E; L89; N2; Green Line

Construction
- Structure type: At-grade

Other information
- Station code: BBRDG
- Fare zone: Suburban 1

History
- Opened: 2 July 1990

Key dates
- 9 December 2017: Luas services commence
Location
- Location within Dublin

Broombridge (Irish: Droichead Broom, previously Droichead na Scuab) is a railway station beside a Luas Tram stop serving Cabra, Dublin 7, Ireland. It lies on the southern bank of the Royal Canal at the western end of what had been Liffey Junction station on the erstwhile Midland Great Western Railway (MGWR). It takes its name from Broome Bridge, which crosses the canal, where William Rowan Hamilton developed the mathematical notion of quaternions. A plaque on the adjacent canal bridge and the name of the Luas Maintenance depot on site, Hamilton Depot, commemorates this.

== Description ==
The railway station was opened on 2 July 1990. Both platforms are step-free accessible, the northern eastbound by a long ramp from the Cabra Road bridge and the southern platform at street level. A pedestrian bridge with lifts and other station improvements were completed in 2018 to facilitate transfers to the two Luas terminus platforms which became operational in December 2017. No toilet facilities are provided despite being an interchange station.

== Services ==
Broombridge is a station on the Western Commuter services. It is the last station approaching Dublin served by both branches of the Western Commuter line before the line splits between trains heading to Connolly Station and those going to Docklands. As of December 2018, the core off-peak rail service is half-hourly between Dublin Connolly station and Maynooth railway station, supplemented in the peaks by an additional half-hourly service from Docklands to the M3 Parkway with some miscellaneous extensions to other services. As of 26 August 2024, intercity services to Sligo also stop here.

=== Luas interchange ===
The Luas Broombridge interchange station is the northside Dublin terminus of the Luas Green Line extension and services began in December 2017. From Broombridge, the tram route takes the old MGWR route to its Broadstone terminus site before continuing to Dublin City Centre. The Broombridge-Hamilton LUAS maintenance depot lies to the south of the line on the final part of the approach to the station.

Preceding station	IÉ	Following station
Dublin Connolly or Drumcondra	InterCity; Dublin-Sligo	Maynooth
Drumcondra	Commuter; Western Commuter (City Branch)	Pelletstown
Docklands	Commuter; Western Commuter (Docklands Branch)	Pelletstown
Preceding station	Luas	Following station
Terminus	Green Line	Cabra towards Sandyford or Brides Glen

=== Bus connections ===
A bus stop is provided at the forecourt on the southern side of the station convenient to the LUAS platforms. Dublin Bus route 40E which travels through Finglas and terminates at Tyrrellstown, near Blanchardstown, has Broombridge station as its southern terminus.

== Vandalism ==
The station is unstaffed and had been subject to significant and sustained vandalism, enough for Iarnród Éireann to be concerned and questions asked about it in the Dáil. The lack of shelter for passengers or seating facilities was similarly questioned. In 2012, additional security measures were added along with seating and decoration in advance of the station's redesign as part of the Luas Cross City project. Leap card validators, previously not provided due to vandalism concerns, have been installed and Iarnród Éireann ticket machines were installed towards the end of 2019.

== Luas ==
Broombridge is the northern terminus of the Green Line of the Luas, Dublin's Light rail tram system. The tram platforms were constructed in 2017, at the same time as the nearby Hamilton Depot, the forecourt which provides space for buses to access the station, a staff car park, and a footbridge over the main line tracks to allow easier interchange. The two platforms lie adjacent to the eastern end of the main line platforms, and interchange between the two systems is possible via steps and a ramp.

On average, trams depart every 10 to 15 minutes and head south towards Brides Glen, a journey which takes approximately one hour. Immediately after leaving Broombridge, they go through a double crossover point which allows them to make use of both platforms. The line runs parallel to the heavy rail line for 350m, before turning south into the Broadstone railway cutting, which takes it into central Dublin.

=== Proposals ===
In 2020, a 4 km (2.5 mi) extension of the green line from Broombridge to Charlestown Shopping Centre was announced. According to the plan for that project, Broombridge would become a through stop, with trams leaving the stop taking a sharp turn to the right, crossing the heavy rail line and the Royal Canal on a specially constructed bridge which would run parallel to Broome Bridge itself, and then continue northwards. Approval for the extension was eventually granted in 2025.

== Reilly's Bridge ==
In 1847, when the railway was opened, the MGWR briefly established a station at Reilly's Bridge just over 0.5 km (0.31 mi) to the west but closed it before the end of the year.

== Gallery ==
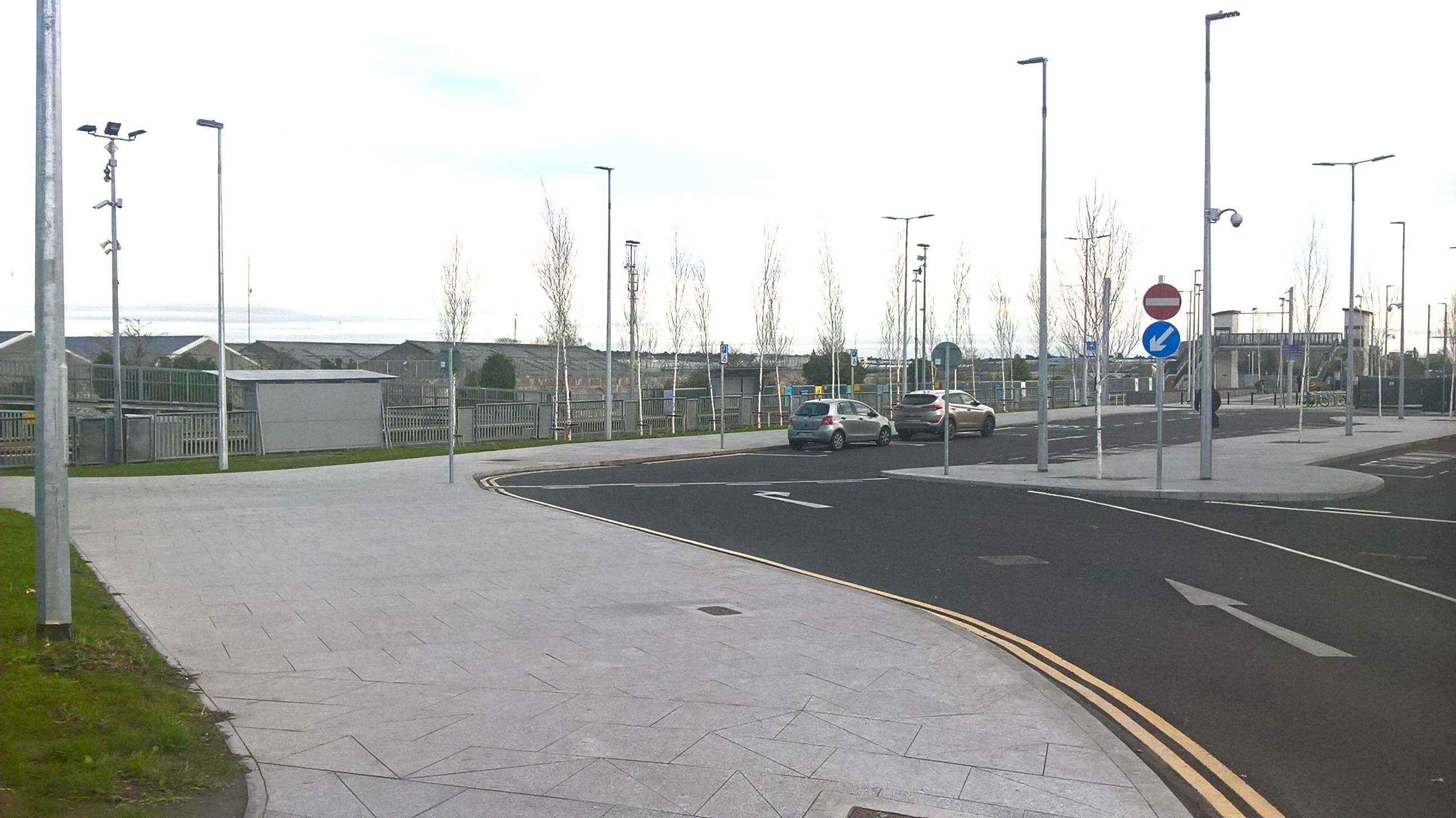
Station southern forecourt in 2019

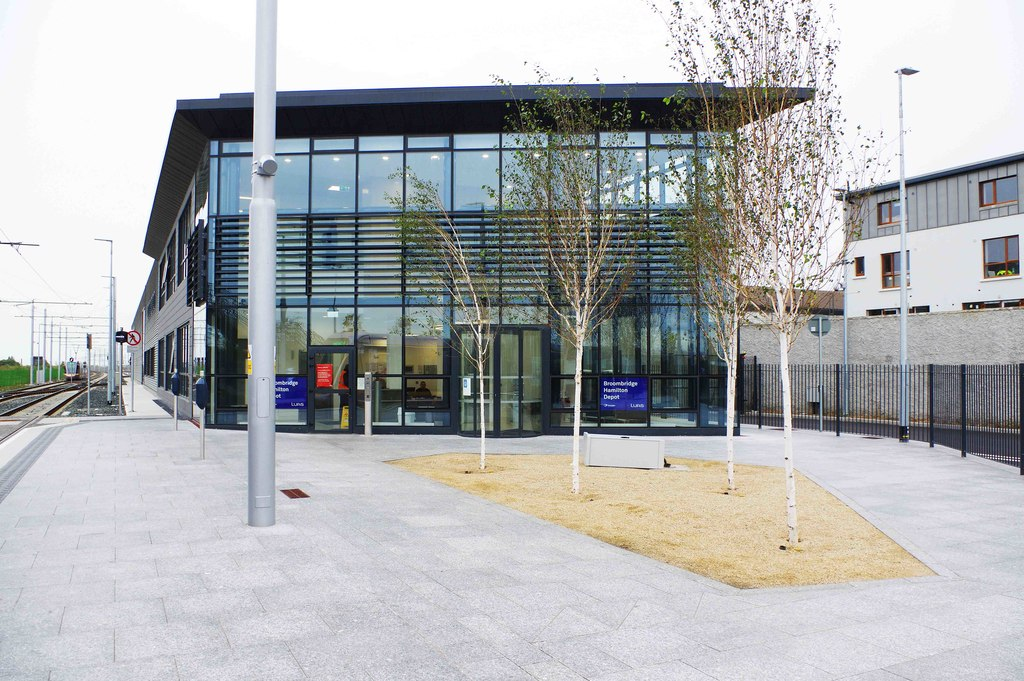
Broombridge-Hamilton depot entrance in 2018

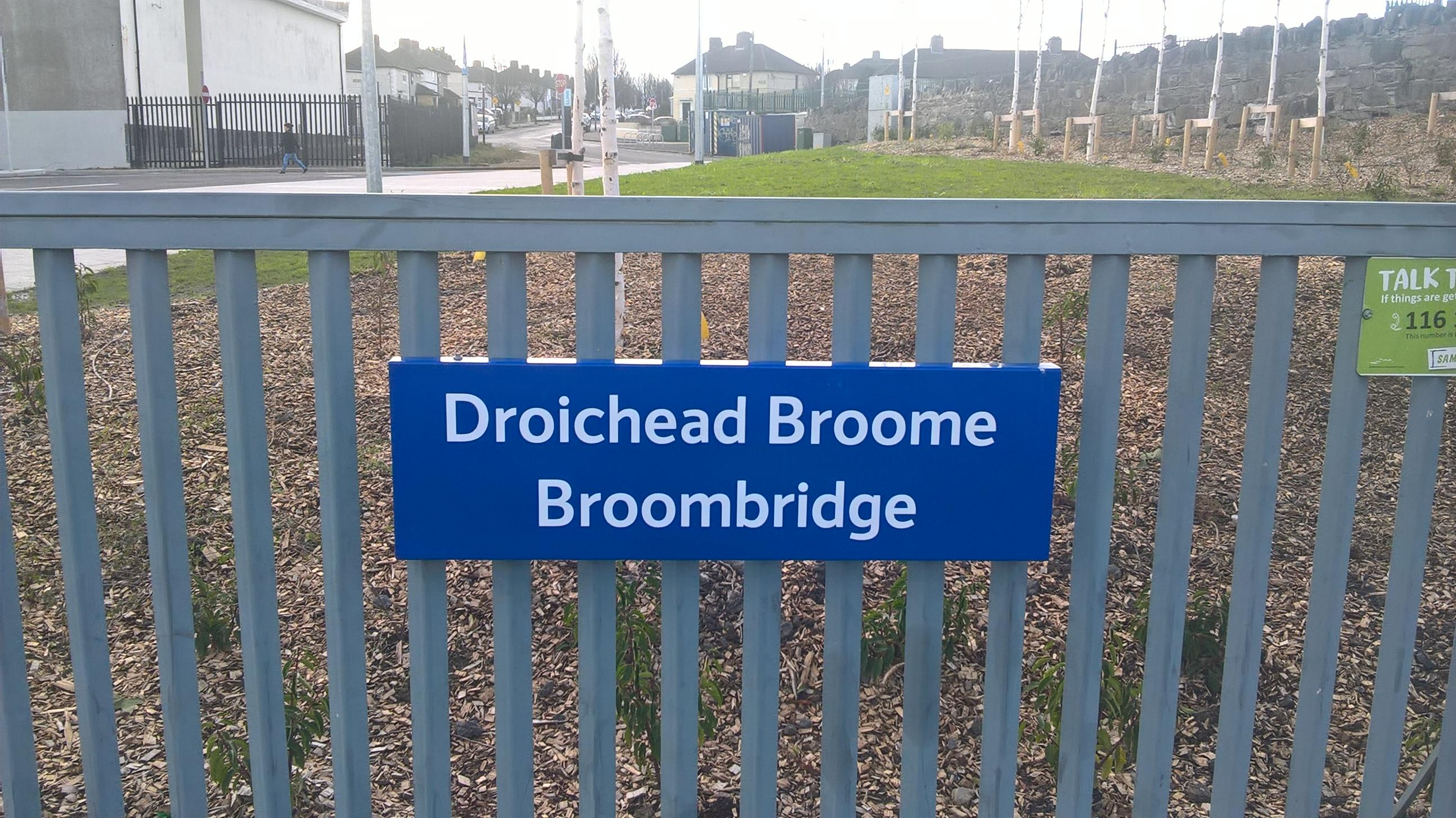
Broombridge train station sign (2019)

== See also ==
- List of railway stations in Ireland
