= Brides Glen Luas stop =

Tram stop in Dublin, Ireland

Brides Glen Gleann Bhríde
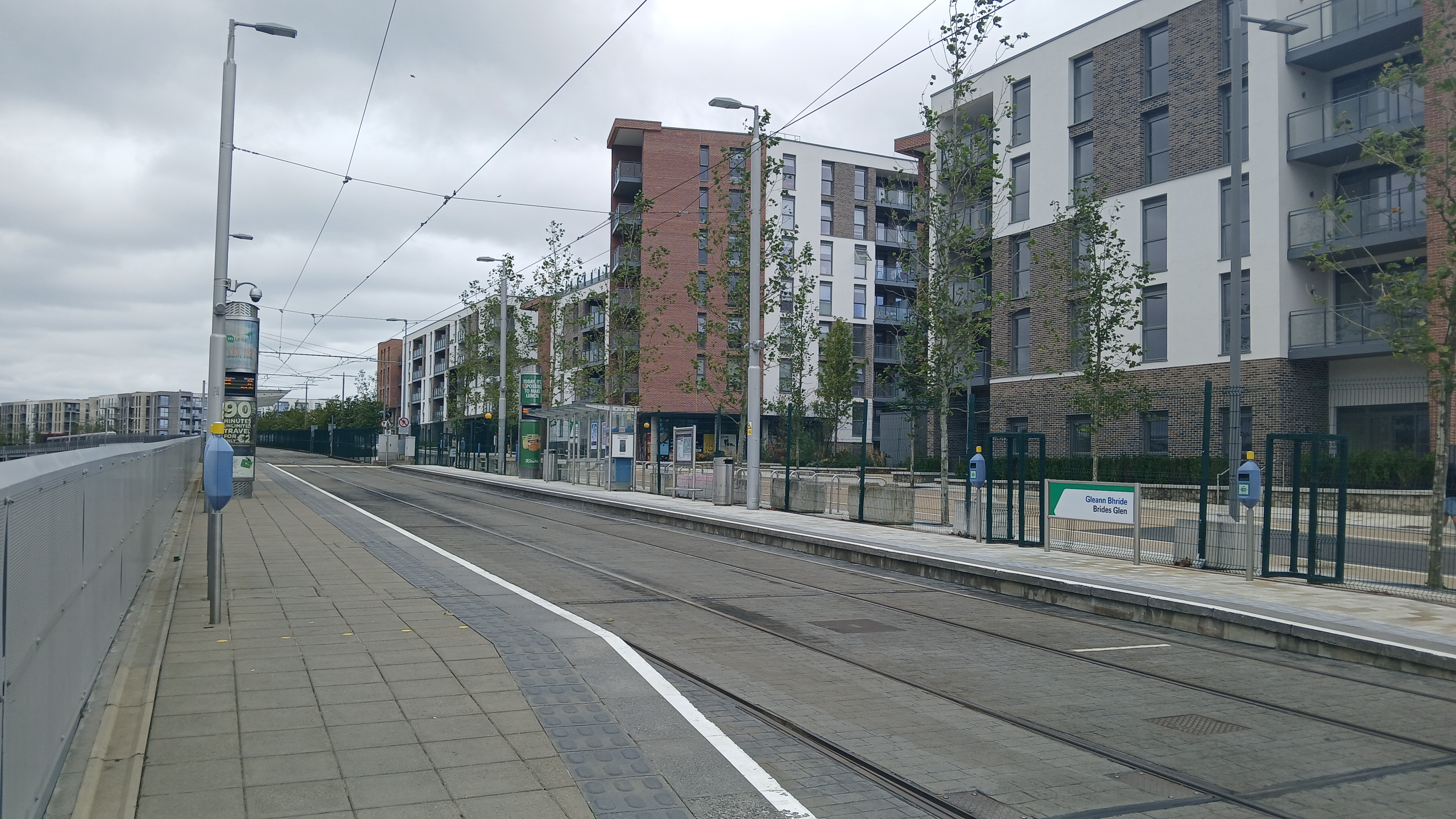
- Brides Glen Luas Stop

General information
- Location: Cherrywood Business Park; Cherrywood, County Dublin; Ireland
- Coordinates: 53°14′32″N 6°08′34″W
- Owner: Transport Infrastructure Ireland
- Operator: Transdev (as Luas)
- Line: Green
- Platforms: 2
- Bus routes: 3
- Bus operators: Dublin Bus; Go-Ahead Ireland
- Connections: 7; 111; X2

Construction
- Structure type: At-grade
- Accessible: yes

Other information
- Fare zone: Green 5

Key dates
- 16 October 2010: Stop opened
Location
- Location within Dublin

Brides Glen (Irish: Gleann Bhríde) is a stop on the Luas light-rail tram system serving Cherrywood in Dún Laoghaire–Rathdown, County Dublin, Ireland. It opened in 2010 as the terminus of an extension of the Green Line south from Sandyford.

== Location and access ==
Brides Glen stop was built at the end of a concrete viaduct over an empty plot of land. The adjacent Grand Parade street was later built on the eastern side of the station, while the eastern side is still undeveloped as of September 2024. The sole entrance is to the road which runs past the southern end of the stop. Ramps provide access from the entrance to each of the side platforms. The short space between the platforms and the road contains buffers, a flower bed, electrical substations, and toilet for Luas drivers. There is a double crossover on the tracks immediately to the north of the stop.

== Services ==
Trams stop at the stop coming from either Parnell or Broombridge every 10-18 minutes.

Preceding station	Luas	Following station
Cherrywood towards Parnell or Broombridge	Green Line	Terminus

== Transport services ==
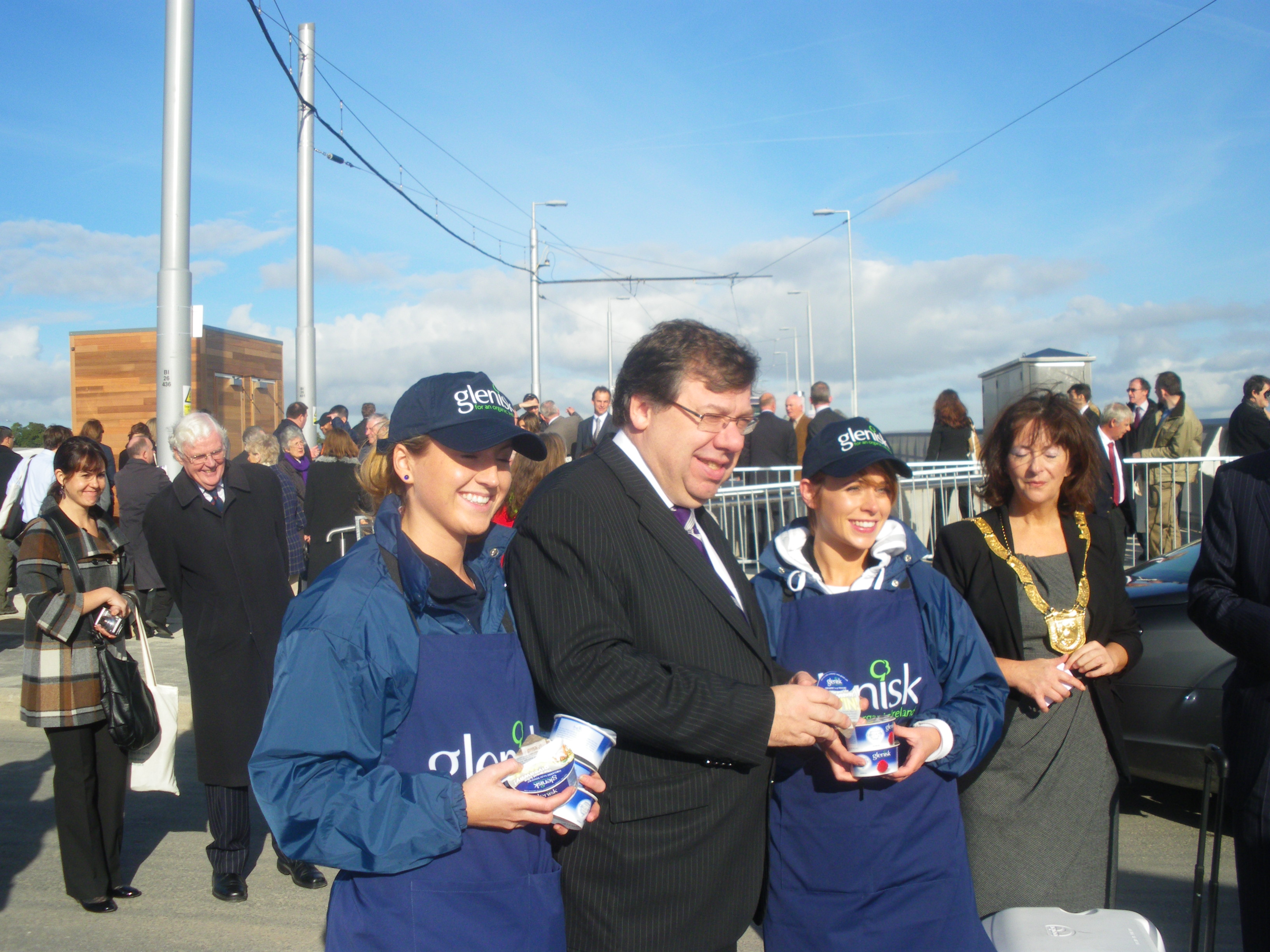
Then Taoiseach Brian Cowen at the opening of Brides Glen station in 2010

The stop is served by Dublin Bus routes 7 and X2, and by Go-Ahead Ireland route 111. These bus routes provide access to the Cherrywood development, Loughlinstown, and St. Columcille's Hospital, as well as further destinations such as Sallynoggin, Dalkey, and Dún Laoghaire.
