= Green Line (Luas) =

Tram line in Dublin, Ireland

Luas Green Line
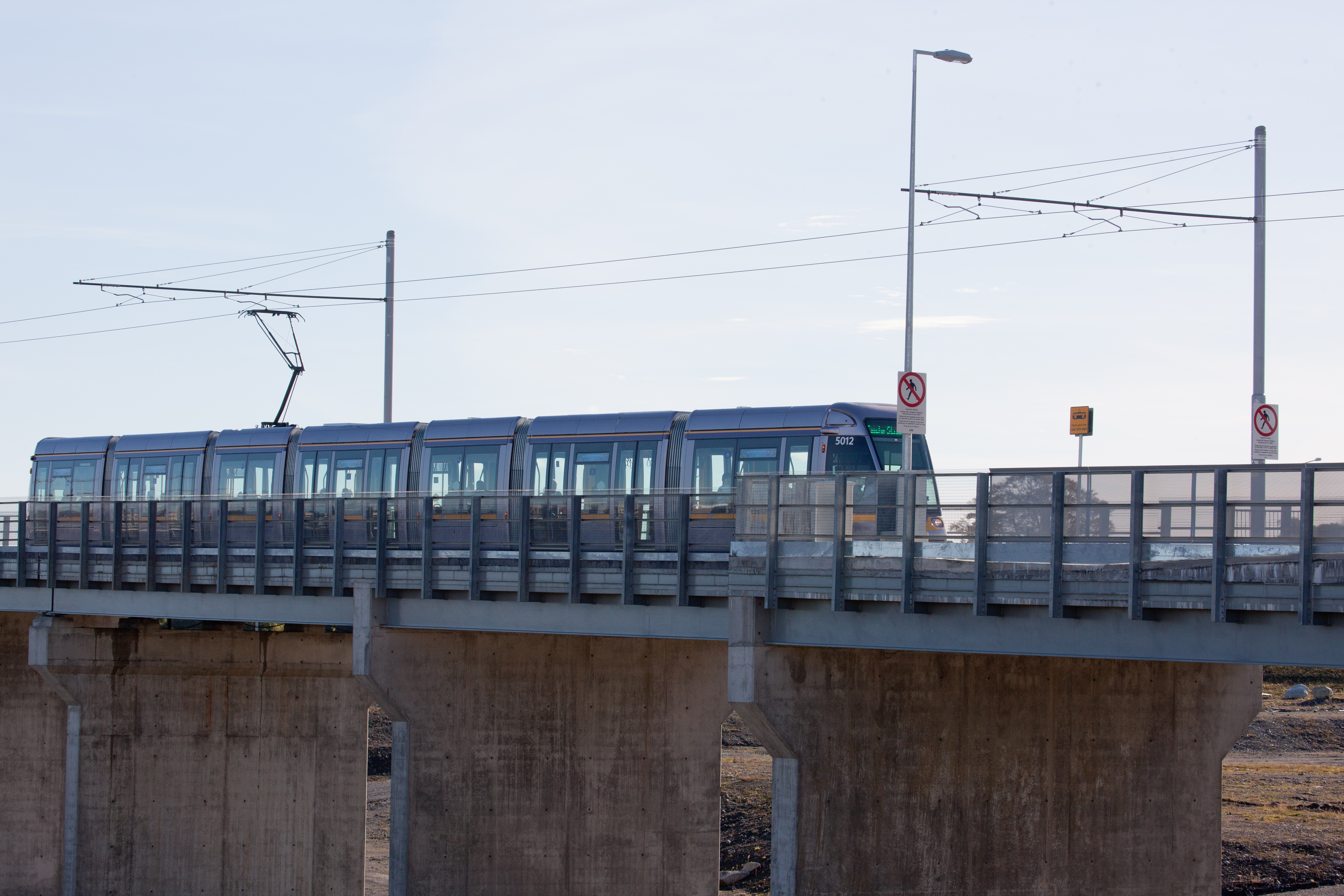
- Dublin-bound Luas after passing over the R118 north of Cherrywood

Overview
- Native name: Líne Uaine, Líne Ghlas
- Status: Operational
- Owner: Transport Infrastructure Ireland
- Locale: Ireland
- Termini: Broombridge Parnell; Sandyford Brides Glen
- Stations: 35

Service
- Type: Light rail
- Operator: Transdev
- Depot: Broombridge-Hamilton Sandyford
- Rolling stock: Alstom Citadis 502

History
- Opened: 30 June 2004

Technical
- Line length: 24.5 km (15.2 mi)
- Num of tracks: Double track
- Character: Primary
- Track gauge: 1,435 mm (4 ft 8 1/2 in) standard gauge
- Electrification: 750 V DC Overhead catenary
- Operating speed: 70 km/h (43 mph)

The Green Line (Irish: Líne Uaine, Líne Ghlas) is one of the two lines of Dublin's Luas light rail system. It mostly follows the route of the old Harcourt Street railway line, which was reserved for possible re-use when it closed in 1958. The Green Line allows for passengers to transfer at O’Connell - GPO and Marlborough to Luas Red Line services and also allows commuters to use Broombridge as an interchange station to reach outer suburbs such as Castleknock and Ongar as well as Iarnród Éireann services.

The Green Line from St Stephen's Green to Sandyford launched on 30 June 2004. An extension to the Bride's Glen stop at Cherrywood was opened on 16 October 2010.

As of 2018, the Green line is operating at near maximum capacity during the morning and evening rush hours, and it experiences mass overcrowding and congestion at these times. To assist in alleviating this congestion, seven new longer trams came into service in 2018, with a further eight entering service in 2020. Platforms between St Stephen's Green and Sandyford have been lengthened to accommodate the new trams.

== Course of the line ==
The section south of St Stephen's Green makes significant re-use of the old Harcourt Street railway line while the northbound route of the newer Cross City section mainly re-uses the old Midland Great Western Railway line after skirting the former site of Broadstone railway works and station.

=== Southern section ===
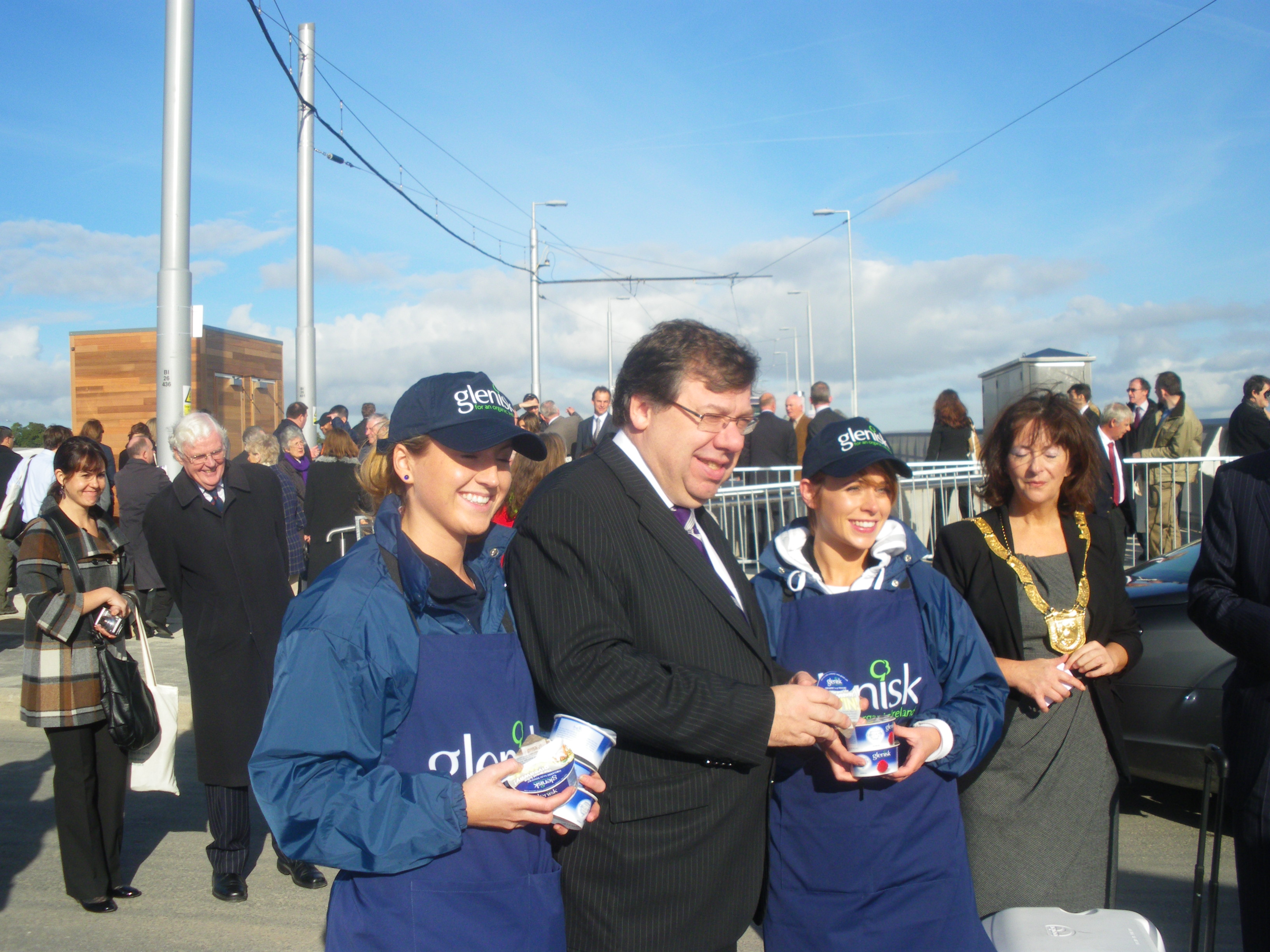
Taoiseach Brian Cowen in Cherrywood at the inaugural ride of the extended Green Line, 2010

Between Harcourt Street and Charlemont, the Green Line takes a large loop east around buildings which did not exist between 1859 and 1959. As such, there is no train bridge on Adelaide Road for the current line, as there had been for the Harcourt Street Line, but rather the current line travels on Adelaide Road to Charlemont.

The line then follows the old alignment of the Harcourt Street line from Charlemont station as far as Blackthorn Avenue where the line runs slightly south of the old line before reaching the current Sandyford stop (known as "Stillorgan" on the Harcourt Street line). After Sandyford the line detours over the Leopardstown Road/Brewery Road junction so as to run west around the Leopardstown Racecourse before rejoining the original alignment just north of Carrickmines. The Harcourt Street line had run around the eastern edge of the racecourse, via Silverpark. Remnants of the old Foxrock Station are visible at the back of The Hedgerows in Foxrock. The route deviation was seemingly intended to serve the new properties that would have been built during the "Celtic Tiger" boom, before the extension was open.

After this detour around Leopardstown Racecourse, the current line runs roughly along the original alignment with some minor detours, particularly prevalent at Laughanstown. The line terminates a few yards south of the Harcour Street line alignment in the developing area of Cherrywood.

There are some other cosmetic differences between the Harcourt Street Line and the current Green Line, such as the positioning of the Ranelagh stop. The location of Ranelagh on the former line was at the current Beechwood stop. The old Ranelagh stop, named Rathmines and Ranelagh, was the last stop on the old line before the train reached the city.

=== Luas Cross City ===
Luas Cross City (Irish: Luas Traschathrach), formerly called Luas BXD, is an extension to the Green Line which runs from St. Stephen's Green to Broombridge railway station.

Construction of Luas Cross City began in June 2013 and it opened on 9 December 2017. The Rosie Hackett Bridge carrying the new line over the river Liffey was opened on 20 May 2014.

The new section begins at the former city centre terminus, St. Stephen's Green, crosses the Red Line near the Abbey stop, and continues northwards, terminating at Broombridge station. There it connects passengers using Iarnród Éireann InterCity services to Sligo (as of 26 August 2024) and commuter services to Maynooth and M3 Parkway.

=== Stops ===
Image	Name Name in Irish	Zone	Location	Transport interchange	Serves
	Broombridge; Droichead Broome	Green 1	Broombridge railway station 53.372684°N 6.298975°W	Broombridge Dublin Bus routes Go Ahead Ireland routes	Cabra; Tolka Valley Park; Dublin Industrial Estate
	Cabra; Cabrach	Green 1	Connaught Street / Fassaugh Road; 53.364200°N 6.281745°W		Cabra; Mount Bernard Park; National Botanic Gardens; Glasnevin Cemetery
	Phibsborough; Baile Phib	Green 1	North Circular Road / Cabra Road; 53.360235°N 6.279945°W		Phibsborough; Dalymount Park; St Peter's Church, Phibsborough
	Grangegorman; Gráinseach Ghormáin	Green 1	Grangegorman; 53.357700°N 6.277520°W	Drumcondra (walk 1.6 km/0.99 mi) dublinbikes	Mater Misericordiae University Hospital; Technological University Dublin; Phoenix Care Centre
	Broadstone — University; An Chloch Leathan — Ollscoil	Green 1 / Central	Western Way; 53.354517°N 6.272976°W	Drumcondra (walk 1.6 km/0.99 mi) Dublin Bus routes dublinbikes	Stoneybatter; King's Inns; 14 Henrietta Street; Blessington Street Park Technological University Dublin
	Dominick; Doiminic	Central	Dominick Street Lower; 53.351386°N 6.265649°W	Dublin Bus routes dublinbikes	Cineworld Dublin; Ilac Centre; 14 Henrietta Street; DIT Bolton Street; Rotunda Hospital
	Parnell	Central	Parnell Street East; 53.352993°N 6.260424°W (Southbound only)	Many bus routes on Parnell Street / Parnell Square dublinbikes	Gate Theatre; James Joyce Centre; Hugh Lane Gallery; Dublin Writers Museum; Mountjoy Square
	Marlborough; Maoilbhríde	Central	Marlborough Street South; 53.349843°N 6.258149°W (Southbound only)	Luas Red Line Abbey Street (walk 100 m/110 yd) Dublin Connolly (walk 650 m/710 yd) Dublin Bus routes dublinbikes	Department of Education; St Mary's Cathedral
	Trinity; An Trionóid	Central	College Street; 53.345455°N 6.258085°E (Southbound only)	Tara Street (walk 350 m/380 yd) Many bus routes on College Green dublinbikes	College Green, Dame Street; Trinity College; Parliament House; Olympia Theatre
	O'Connell Upper; Ó Conaill Uachtarach	Central	O'Connell Street North; 53.351572°N 6.261067°W (Northbound only)	Many bus routes on O'Connell Street dublinbikes	O'Connell Street; Savoy Cinema
	O'Connell - GPO; Ó Conaill - AOP	Central	O'Connell Street South; 53.349625°N 6.260295°W (Northbound only)	Luas Red Line Abbey Street (walk 140 m/150 yd); Many bus routes on O'Connell Street dublinbikes	O'Connell Street, Henry Street; The Spire; General Post Office
	Westmoreland	Central	Westmoreland Street; 53.346070°N 6.259072°E (Northbound only)	Tara Street (walk 450 m / 1/4 mile) Dublin Bus routes	The National Wax Museum Plus Trinity College; Parliament House; Olympia Theatre
	Dawson; Dásain	Central	Dawson Street; 53.341516°N 6.258192°W	Dublin Pearse (walk 1 km / 2/3 mile) Dublin Bus routes dublinbikes	Dawson Street Grafton Street Kildare Street; Leinster House; St. Ann's Church, Dawson Street; Kerlin Gallery; Mansion House Leinster House National Museum of Ireland – Archaeology; National Library of Ireland Trinity College Dublin
	St. Stephen's Green; Faiche Stiabhna	Central	St. Stephen's Green West; 53.339179°N 6.261350°W	Tara Street (walk 1.3 km / 3/4 mile); Dublin Pearse (walk 1.6 km / 1 mile); Dublin Bus routes dublinbikes	St. Stephen's Green Grafton Street; Gaiety Theatre; Royal College of Surgeons of Ireland; Dublin Castle and Chester Beatty Library
	Harcourt; Sráid Fhearchair	Central	Harcourt Street; 53.333644°N 6.262734°W	Dublin Bus routes dublinbikes	National Concert Hall; Iveagh Gardens; Synge Street CBS
	Charlemont	Central / Green 2	Grand Parade; 53.330610°N 6.258630°W	Dublin Bus routes dublinbikes	Portobello; Cathal Brugha Barracks; Grand Canal
	Ranelagh; Raghnallach	Green 2	Ranelagh; 53.326127°N 6.256212°W	Dublin Bus routes	Ranelagh Rathmines; Leinster Cricket Club; Fitzwilliam Lawn Tennis Club
	Beechwood; Coill na Feá	Green 2	Dunville Avenue / Beechwood Road; 53.320924°N 6.254658°W	Dublin Bus routes	Rathmines; Sandford Park School
	Cowper	Green 2	Cowper Road; 53.320924°N 6.254658°W	Dublin Bus routes	Dartry Gonzaga College
	Milltown; Baile an Mhuilinn	Green 2	Richmond Avenue South; 53.309654°N 6.251807°W	Go-Ahead Ireland routes	Milltown Golf Club; Alexandra College; Trinity Hall
	Windy Arbour; Na Glasáin	Green 2	Churchtown Road Lower / St. Columbanus' Road; 53.301759°N 6.250675°W	Dublin Bus routes	Windy Arbour, Churchtown, Clonskeagh; University College Dublin (Belfield campus; walk 1.7 km/1.1 mi); Islamic Cultural Centre of Ireland; De La Salle College Churchtown; Central Mental Hospital
	Dundrum; Dún Droma	Green 2/3	Dundrum / Taney Road; 53.292424°N 6.245123°W	Dublin Bus routes Go-Ahead Ireland routes Dublin Coach routes	Dundrum; Dundrum Town Centre (main entrance)
	Balally; Baile Amhlaoibh	Green 3	Drummartin; 53.286030°N 6.236712°W	Dublin Bus routes Luas Park + Ride	Balally; Goatstown; Dundrum Town Centre (Dundrum South); Wesley College; Mount Anville Secondary School; Airfield Estate
	Kilmacud; Cill Mochuda	Green 3	Benildus Avenue / Drummartin Link Road; 53.282948°N 6.224090°W	Dublin Bus routes	Kilmacud; St Benildus College
	Stillorgan; Stigh Lorgan	Green 3	Blackthorn Avenue; 53.277643°N 6.204595°W	Dublin Bus routes Luas Park + Ride	Stillorgan; Sandyford (west side); Beacon Hospital; RCSI Institute of Leadership; St. Raphaela's School
	Sandyford; Áth an Ghainimh	Green 3/4	Blackthorn Avenue; 53.277618°N 6.204634°W	Dublin Bus routes Go-Ahead Ireland routes Luas Park + Ride	Sandyford; Stillorgan (east side); Sandyford Business District
	Central Park; An Pháirc Láir	Green 4	South County Business Park; 53.270099°N 6.203786°W	Aircoach routes	Leopardstown Park Hospital; Leopardstown Racecourse; Foxrock; Kilmacud Crokes GAA; Nord Anglia International School Dublin South County Business Park
	Glencairn; Gleann an Chairn	Green 4	Murphystown Road; 53.266281°N 6.209923°W	Dublin Bus routes Go-Ahead Ireland routes	Glencairn House
	The Gallops; An Eachrais	Green 4	Murphystown Way; 53.261157°N 6.205870°W	Go-Ahead Ireland routes	Stepaside; Leopardstown; Kilgobbin Castle
	Leopardstown Valley; Gleann Baile na Lobhair	Green 4	Ballyogan Road; 53.258316°N 6.198373°W	Go-Ahead Ireland routes	Leopardstown shopping centre Ballyogan
	Ballyogan Wood; Coill Bhaile Uí Ógáin	Green 4	Ballyogan Vale; 53.255078°N 6.184431°W	Go-Ahead Ireland routes	Ballyogan; Carrickmines Park; Stepaside Golf Course
	Carrickmines; Carraig Mhaighin	Green 5	Glenamuck Road North; 53.254350°N 6.171621°W	Go-Ahead Ireland routes Luas Park + Ride	Carrickmines; Cabinteely; Foxrock; Cornelscourt; Carrickmines Park; Carrickmines Golf Club; Carrickmines Croquet and Lawn Tennis Club
	Laughanstown; Baile an Lachnáin	Green 5	Laughanstown (Lehaunstown); 53.250636°N 6.154953°W		Cabinteely; Tully Church; Brennanstown Portal Tomb
	Cherrywood; Coill na Sílíní	Green 5	Grand Parade; 53.245382°N 6.145839°W		Cherrywood; Cherrywood Business Park
	Brides Glen; Gleann Bhríde	Green 5	Cherrywood Business Park; 53.241870°N 6.142782°W	Dublin Bus routes Go-Ahead Ireland routes	Cherrywood; Loughlinstown; St. Columcille's Hospital

=== Bridges ===
The line re-uses some existing bridges and viaducts and has had new bridges specially constructed. The new build William Dargan Bridge at Dundrum crosses the Slang River. The River Liffey is crossed by the new Rosie Hackett Bridge southbound and the existing O'Connell Bridge northbound. The River Dodder is crossed by the Nine Arches Bridge originally constructed for the Harcourt Street railway line in 1854.

=== Depots ===
The Green line initially was provisioned with a works depot just past the Sandyford terminus and opposite the old Stillorgan railway station building. The depot could stable 32 trams. When the Green line was extended to Broombridge a further depot was constructed over part of the old Liffey Junction site. It was named Hamilton Depot in honour of William Rowan Hamilton who developed the quaternion mathematical number system. The primary control facility for the Luas system for such functions as power and signalling lies at the Red line Luas depot at Red Cow. Following a storm damage incident in October 2017 at Red Cow it was found the depots at Broombridge and Sandyford were not able to take over the function and the whole Luas system was suspended for two days.

== Planned developments ==
=== Partial upgrade to metro standard ===
==== Initial proposal ====
The section of the Luas Green Line between Charlemont and Sandyford was built with the eventual intention that it be upgraded to carry metro services. This was first outlined by the Dublin Transportation Office (now part of the National Transport Authority) in its "Platform for Change" report published in November 2001, which proposed the section would be upgraded and included in a metro line between Dublin Airport and Sandyford. The metro project was eventually launched as Metro North with an altered route from Swords to St. Stephens Green. No further plans for an upgrade of the Luas line were made before Metro North was shelved by transport minister Leo Varadkar, then Minister for Transport, Tourism and Sport, in November 2011.

In 2015, the metro project was revived by the National Transport Authority as the "new Metro North". A strategy report for transport in the Greater Dublin area published in 2016 additionally included the Metro South project, which would see the Luas Green Line upgraded to metro standard between Ranelagh and Bride's Glen "to cater for the longer term usage forecasts". The proposal included the construction of a tunnel extension from the Ranelagh area to St. Stephen's Green, where it would have linked with Metro North. At the time, it was planned that trains could either enter the tunnel at Ranelagh to run on the Metro North route towards Swords, or continue at street level on the Luas tracks towards Broombridge.

In 2018, a reworked metro project was announced as MetroLink, which builds upon the Metro North and Metro South projects. The line would run from Swords to a new interchange station at Charlemont, where trains would emerge and continue above-ground towards Sandyford on the tracks currently used by the Luas Green Line. Luas trains would be replaced by metro services between Ranelagh and Sandyford, but continue to operate between Broombridge and Charlemont as well as between Sandyford and Bridge's Glen. The National Transport Authority stated at the time that MetroLink was planned to enter service in 2027.

==== Deferral ====
During the public consultation process for this proposal, Dublin City Council submitted that a large sewer was blocking the path of where the tunnel was planned to emerge, just south of the existing Charlemont tram stop. This necessitated the realignment of the tunnel portal to just north of the current Beechwood Luas stop. This realignment also meant that the planned upgrade of the Luas line would grow in size from a possible 9 months to nearly 48, as the tunnel boring machine needed to reach the new portal in Beechwood before the Green Line upgrade works could begin. This would therefore delay the opening of the entire Metrolink line. The constructability report detailed, however, that if the Green Line Upgrade was done as a second phase to the northern section, then the northern could open on schedule. By completing the Green Line upgrade as a second phase, time savings could also be made on the upgrade works.

The MetroLink project has since proceeded to without the section between Beechwood and Sandyford. The line would terminate at Charlemont in the south, where passengers could change to Luas Green Line trains for onward travel to Sandyford. In May 2019, an executive of Transport Infrastructure Ireland reaffirmed their commitment to extend the metro to Sandyford, though it would not proceed "now, or in the short term."

=== Proposed extension to Finglas ===
In July 2020, a public consultation was announced seeking feedback on the extension of the Luas Green line from Broombridge, across the River Tolka through Tolka Valley Park, through west Finglas before terminating at Charlestown. As of 2024, the "Luas Finglas" project was projected to be a four-station northward extension from Broombridge, with stops at St Helena's Road, Finglas Village, St Margaret's Road and Charlestown. Planning approval was granted for this extension in October 2025.

== Gallery ==
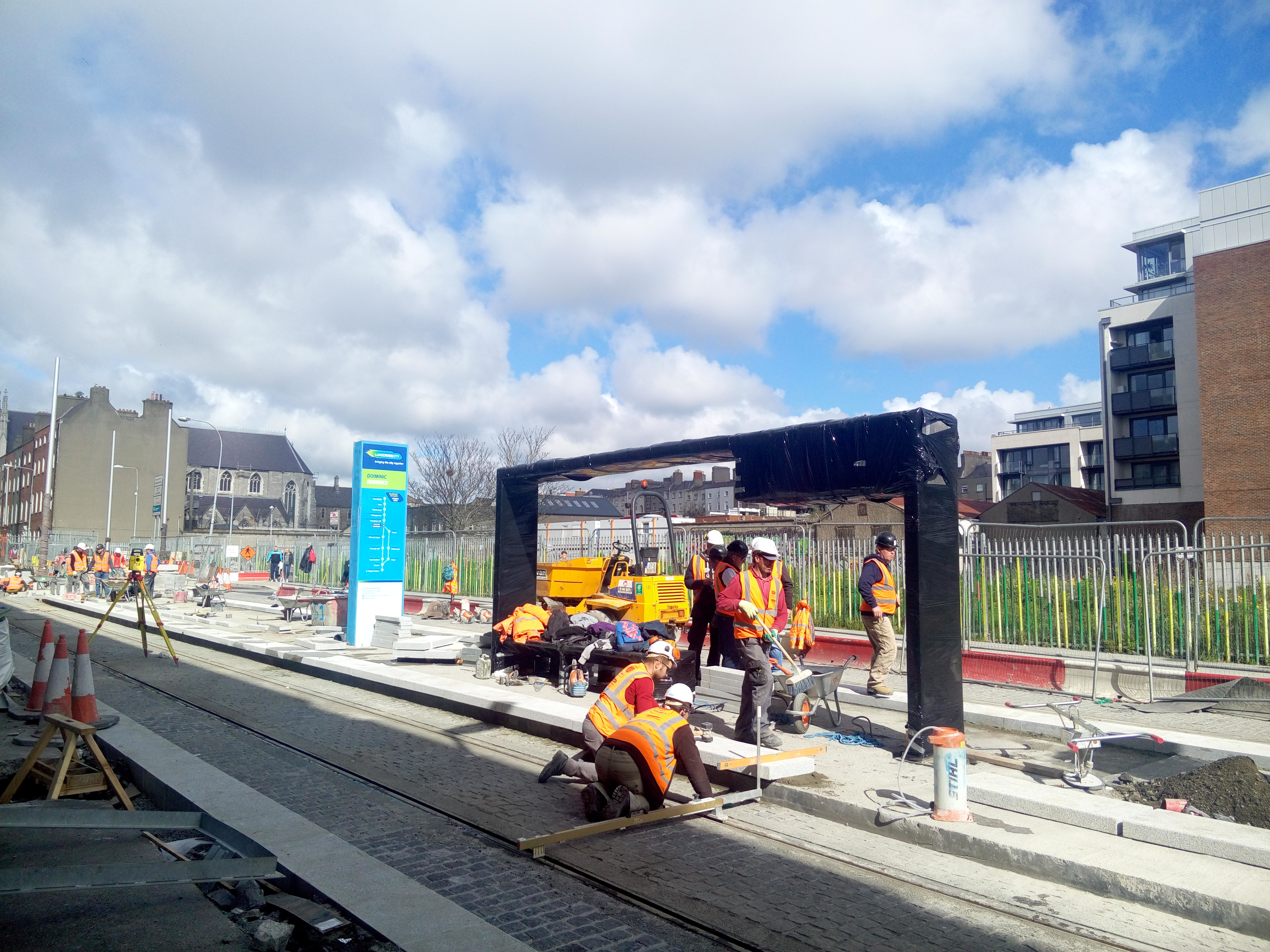
Dominick stop construction site on Luas Cross City line, taken in Dominick Street Lower

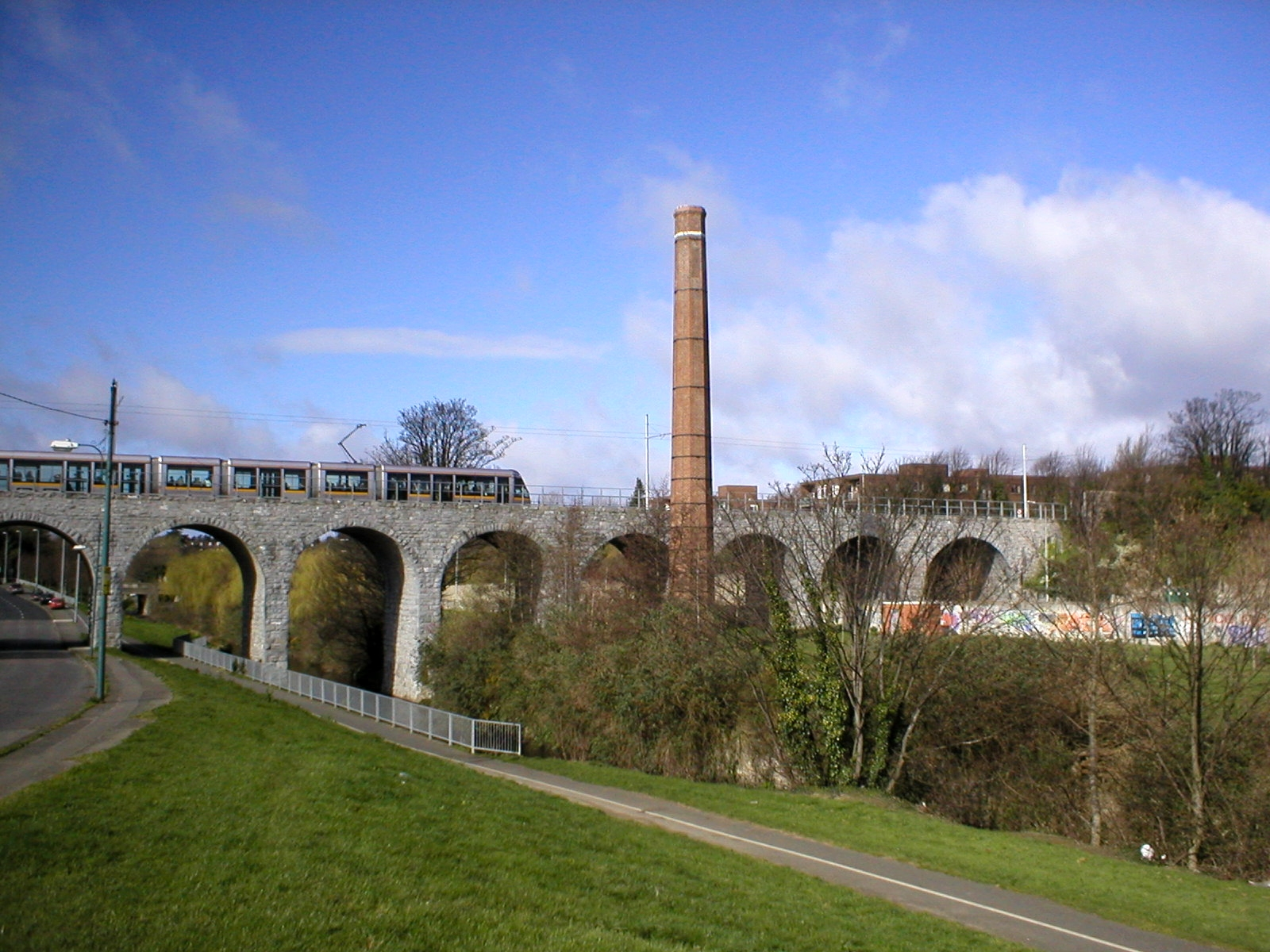
The Nine Arches Bridge over the River Dodder at Milltown

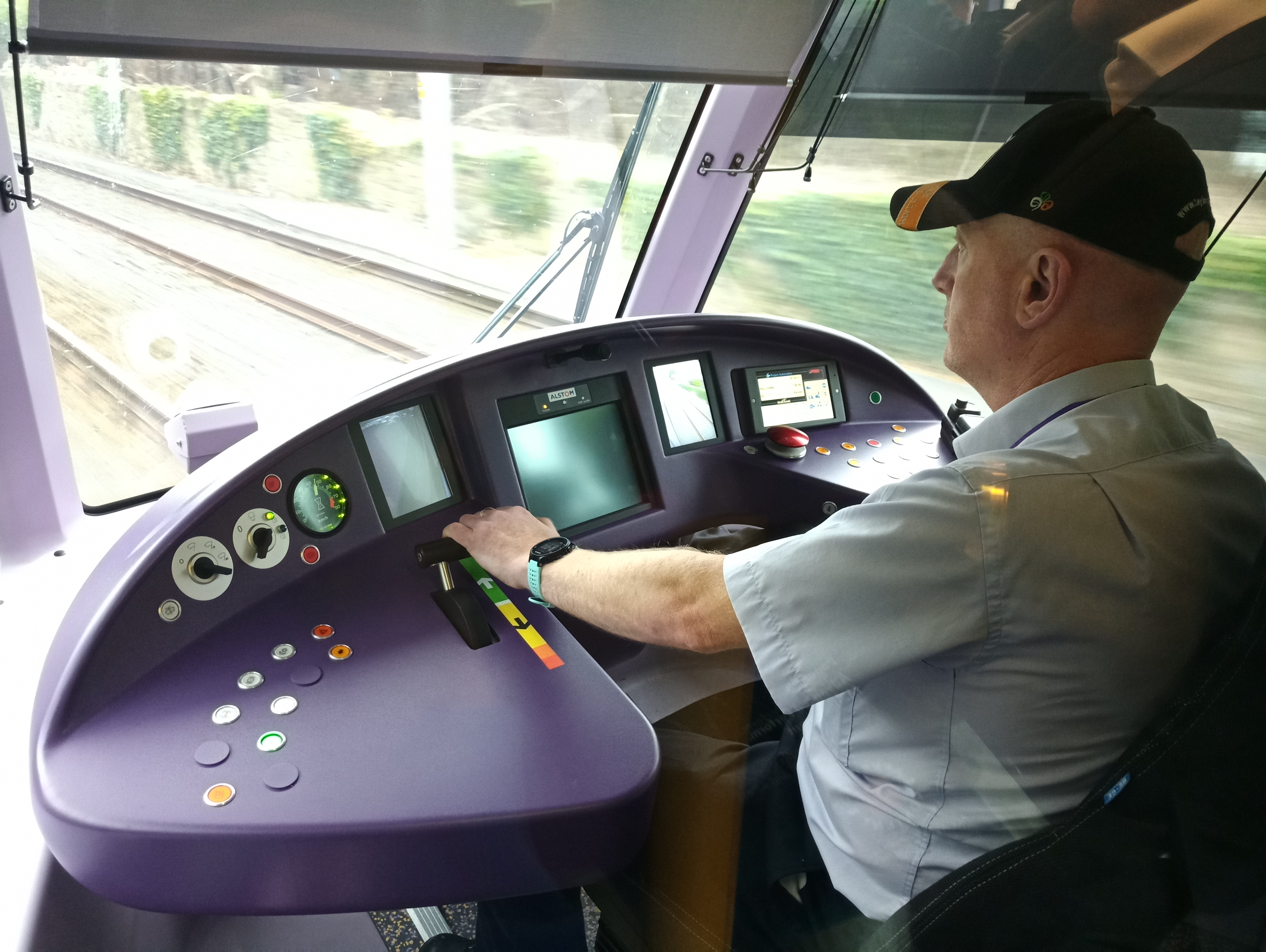
Driving cab of a Luas Green Line tram

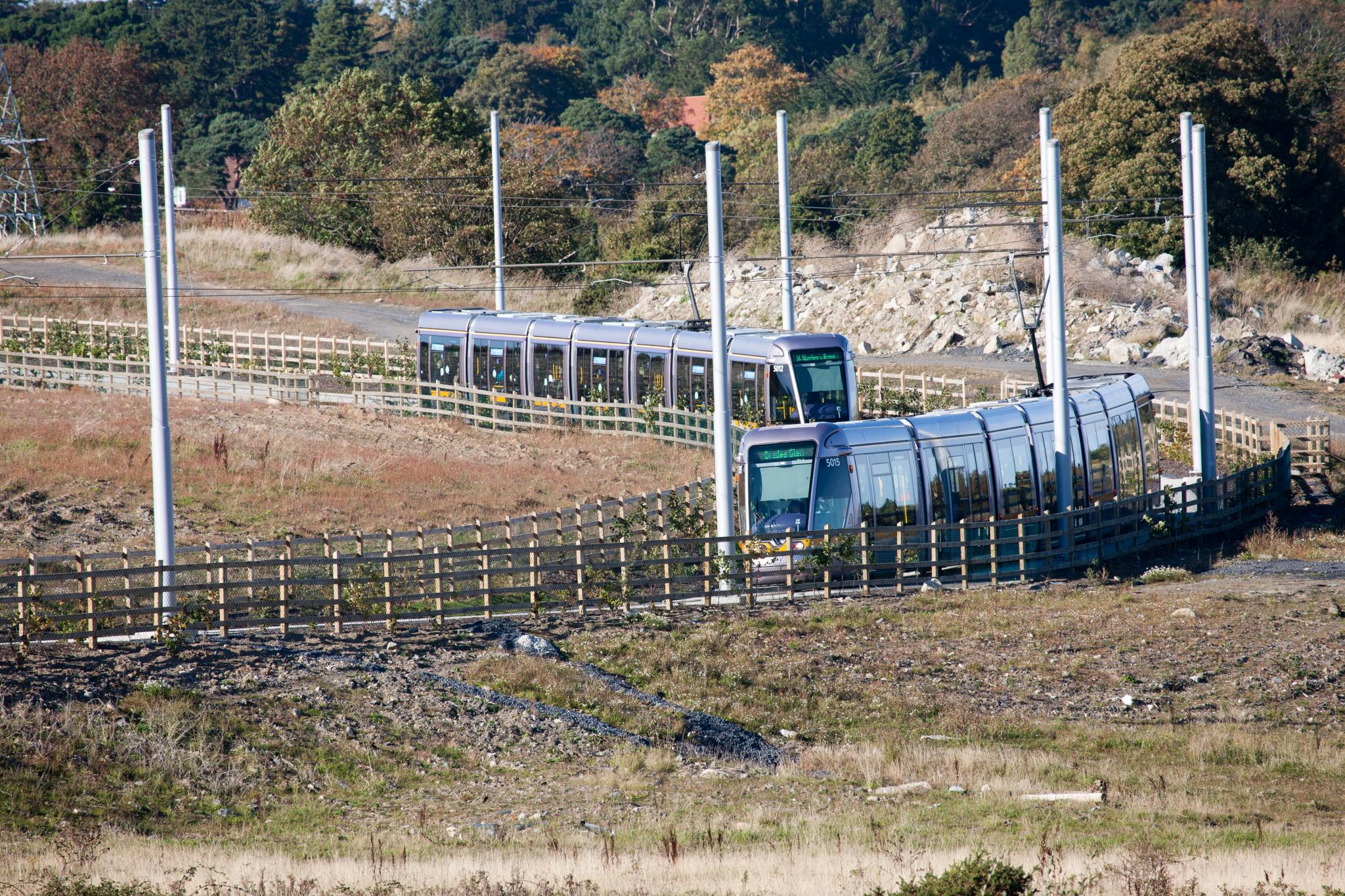
Trams pass near Cherrywood in 2010
