= Leopardstown =

Suburb of Dublin, Ireland

Leopardstown Baile na Lobhar (Irish)
- Suburb
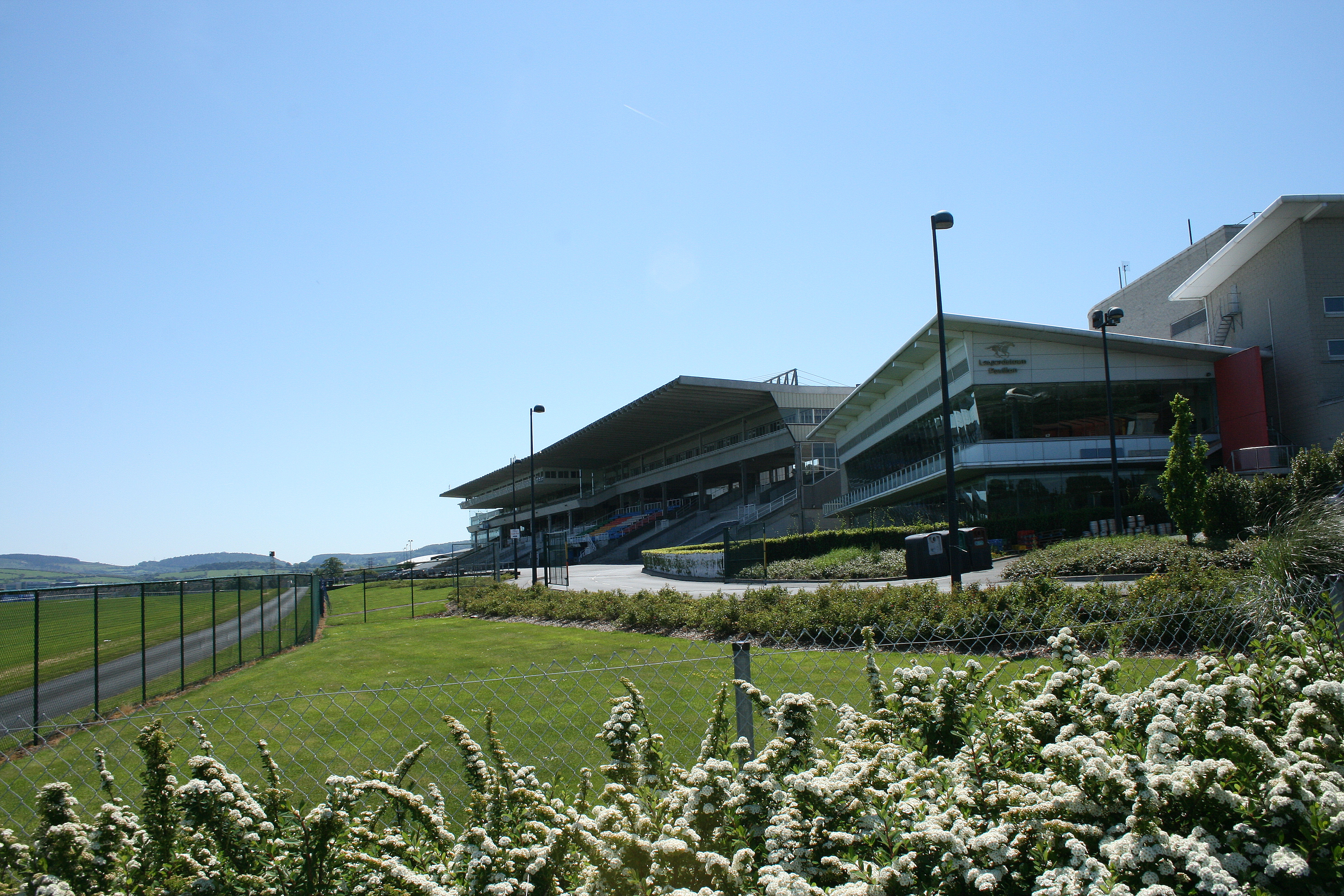
- The stand at Leopardstown Racecourse

- Location in Dublin Leopardstown (Ireland)
- Coordinates: 53.270°N 6.205°W
- Country: Ireland
- Province: Leinster
- County: Dún Laoghaire–Rathdown
- Elevation: 93 m (305 ft)

Population (2006)
  - Total: 2,067
- Time zone: UTC+0 (WET)
  - Summer (DST): UTC+1 (IST (WEST))
- Eircode routing key: D18
- Telephone area code: +353(0)1
- Irish Grid Reference: O202259

Leopardstown (Irish: Baile na Lobhar, meaning 'town of the lepers'), historically called Ballinlore, is a suburb of Dublin, Ireland, at the foot of the Wicklow Mountains. With institutional lands and a large racecourse, it is divided by the M50 motorway, and adjoins Sandyford, Stepaside, Ballyogan, Carrickmines, Foxrock and Stillorgan.

== Etymology and history ==
Leprosy was common in Dublin in the medieval period and in the 14th century St Stephen's Leper Hospital was built near St Stephen's Green. It was later moved out to the foothills of the Dublin Mountains to avoid infection spreading in the city. The area became known as Baile na Lobhar, "town of the lepers". This was anglicized as 'Ballinlore' and translated into English as 'Leperstown', eventually being corrupted to 'Leopardstown'.

== Places of interest ==
Places of interest in Leopardstown include Leopardstown Racecourse, Glencairn House (the residence of the British Ambassador to Ireland), Leopardstown Park Hospital, and Burton Hall, the childhood home of Hollywood actress Kathleen Ryan.

== Sports ==
The area is home to Leopardstown Racecourse, a horse-racing venue which was originally established in 1888. The Kilmacud Crokes' hurling pitch is located at Silverpark in Leopardstown.

== Culture ==
Leopardstown is mentioned in the feature film Spy Kids, a road sign for Baile an Liopaird being seen outside Machete's shop. The Bob Geldof song "The House At The Top Of The World" includes the lyric "Soon I'd come to the Leopardstown dual carriageway ... I don't remember a town being there and I never saw no leopards."

== Transport ==
=== Rail ===
Leopardstown was formerly served by the Harcourt Street railway line from Dublin to Bray, with Foxrock serving as the nearest station. It served the nearby Leopardstown Racecourse until the line was closed in January 1959.

Today Leopardstown is served by four Luas Green Line stops: Central Park, Glencairn, The Gallops and Leopardstown Valley.

=== Bus ===
Dublin Bus routes 44, 47 and 118 and Go-Ahead Ireland routes S8 and 114 serve Leopardstown. Aircoach route 700 links Leopardstown with Dublin Airport.
