= Ballyogan =

Suburb south of Dublin, Ireland

Ballyogan Baile Uí Ógáin (Irish)
- Suburb
- Location in Dublin
- Coordinates: 53°15′30″N 6°11′50″W
- Country: Ireland
- Province: Leinster
- County: County Dublin
- Local authority: Dún Laoghaire-Rathdown County Council
- Elevation: 116 m (381 ft)

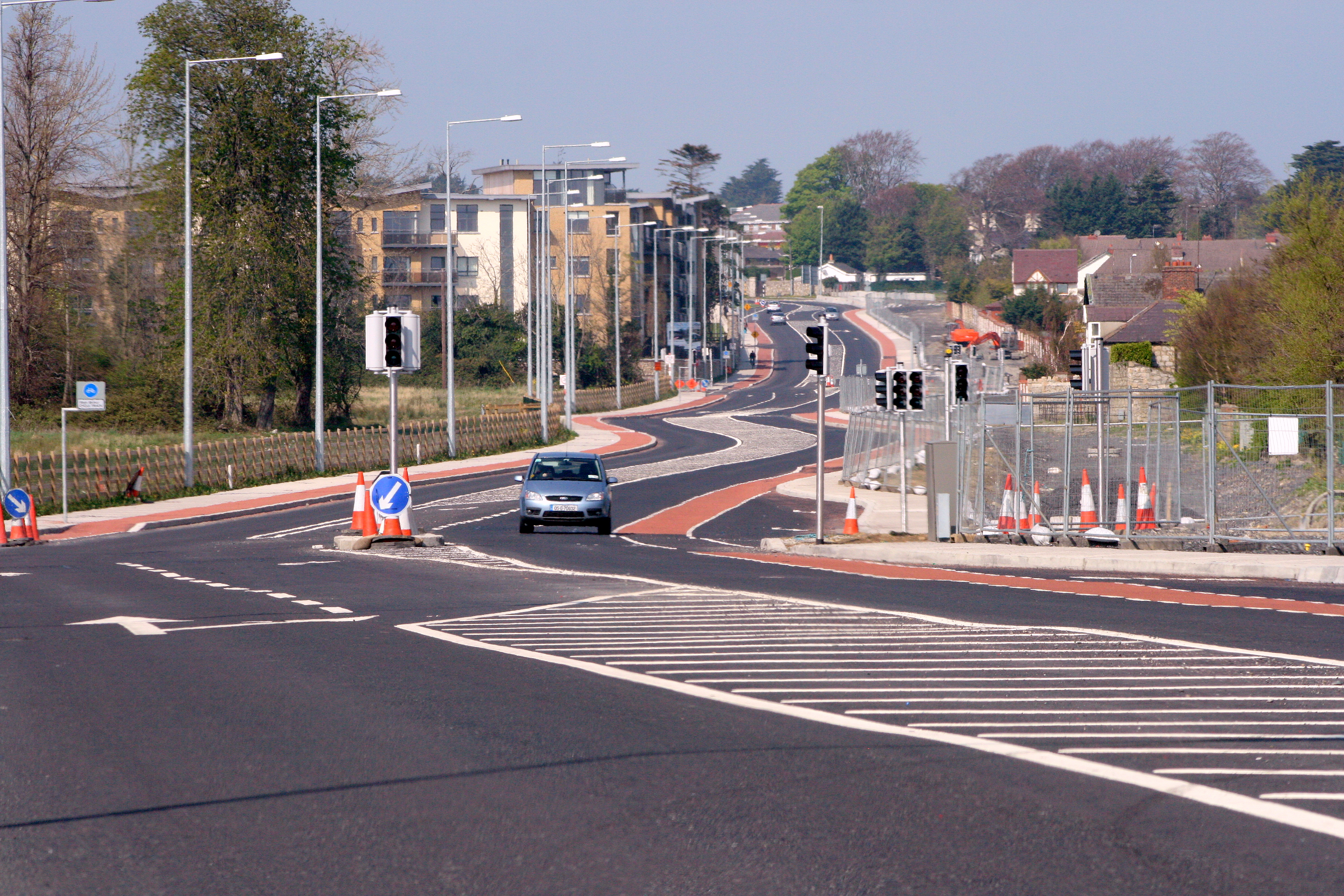
Ballyogan Road, northern (Sandyford) end; Luas Green line extension under construction on the right

Ballyogan (Irish: Baile Uí Ógáin, meaning 'Hogan's town') is a residential area in Dún Laoghaire–Rathdown, County Dublin, Ireland, located approximately 12 km south of Dublin city centre.

== Location ==
Ballyogan is bounded to the west and north by Stepaside and Sandyford; across the M50 motorway to the east is Leopardstown and to the south, Carrickmines.

Ballyogan is centred on Ballyogan Road. The residential and shopping areas are located between the road and the M50 motorway which runs more or less parallel to and east of Ballyogan road. The Ballyogan Road is nearly 3 km long; it starts in Sandyford at its northern end and ends at Carrickmines.

== Population ==
The area has a population of about 2,000 people.

== Amenities ==
West of the Ballyogan Road is a former Local Authority landfill and a recycling centre.

== Historical elements ==
Also running west of the road are remnants of the Pale ditch, a defensive structure which marks a former border of The Pale. Just west of here are the Dublin Mountains which were outside English control. Another reminder of the area's past as a frontier country is found at adjoining Carrickmines where the remains of Carrickmines Castle became a centre of controversy when the M50 was being built.

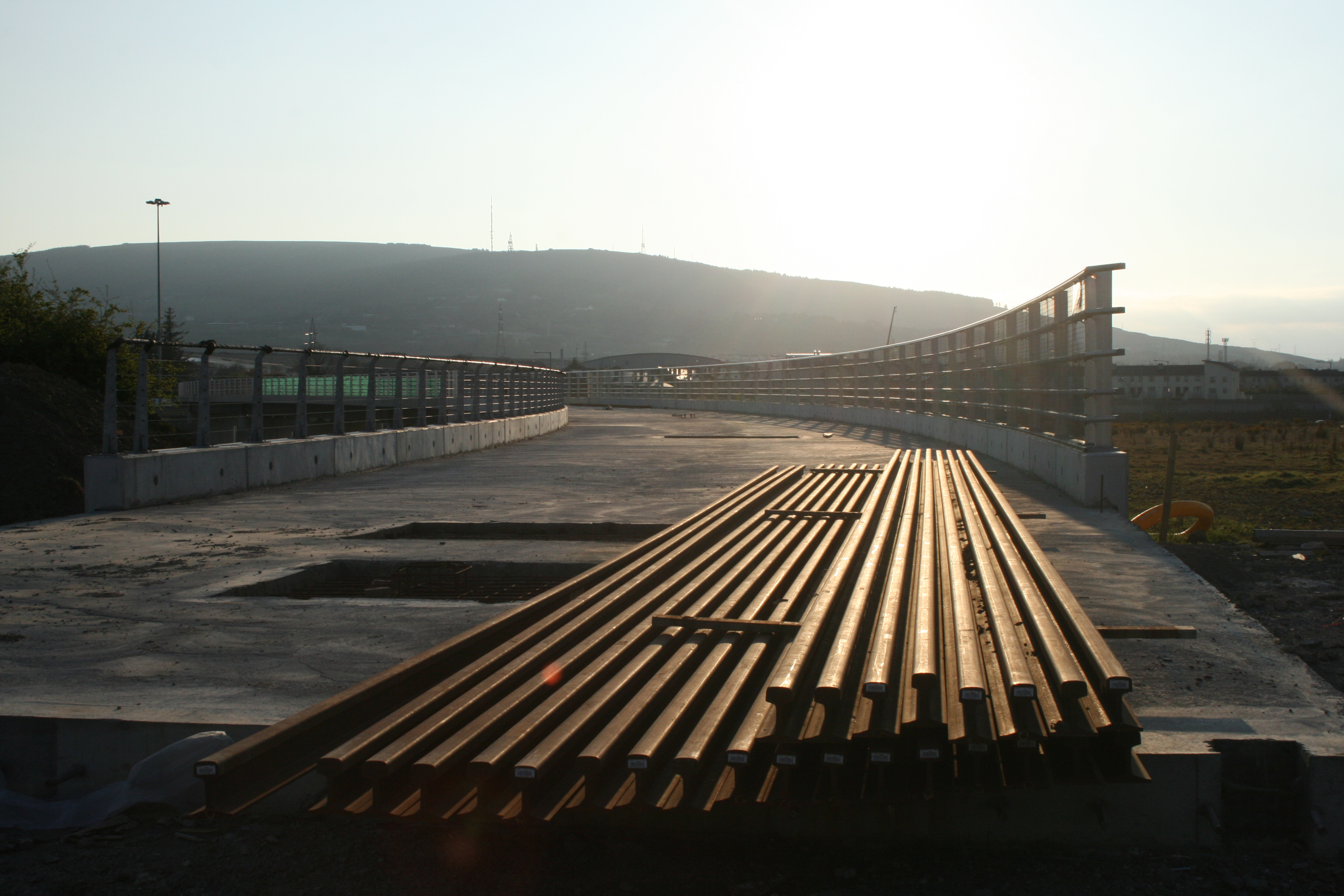
Luas Green Line extension crossing the M50 at Ballyogan

== Transport ==
The Luas Green Line extension, opened in October 2010, runs most of the length of the road on its Eastern side. It has three stops on Ballyogan Road; The Gallops; Leopardstown Valley and Ballyogan Wood, which is in Ballyogan, as the name suggests.

Ballyogan is also served by regular Go-Ahead Ireland (formerly Dublin Bus) 63 and 63A services which run from Dún Laoghaire to Kilternan.

== See also ==
- List of towns and villages in Ireland
