= Central Park Luas stop =

Tram stop in Dublin, Ireland

Central Park An Pháirc Láir
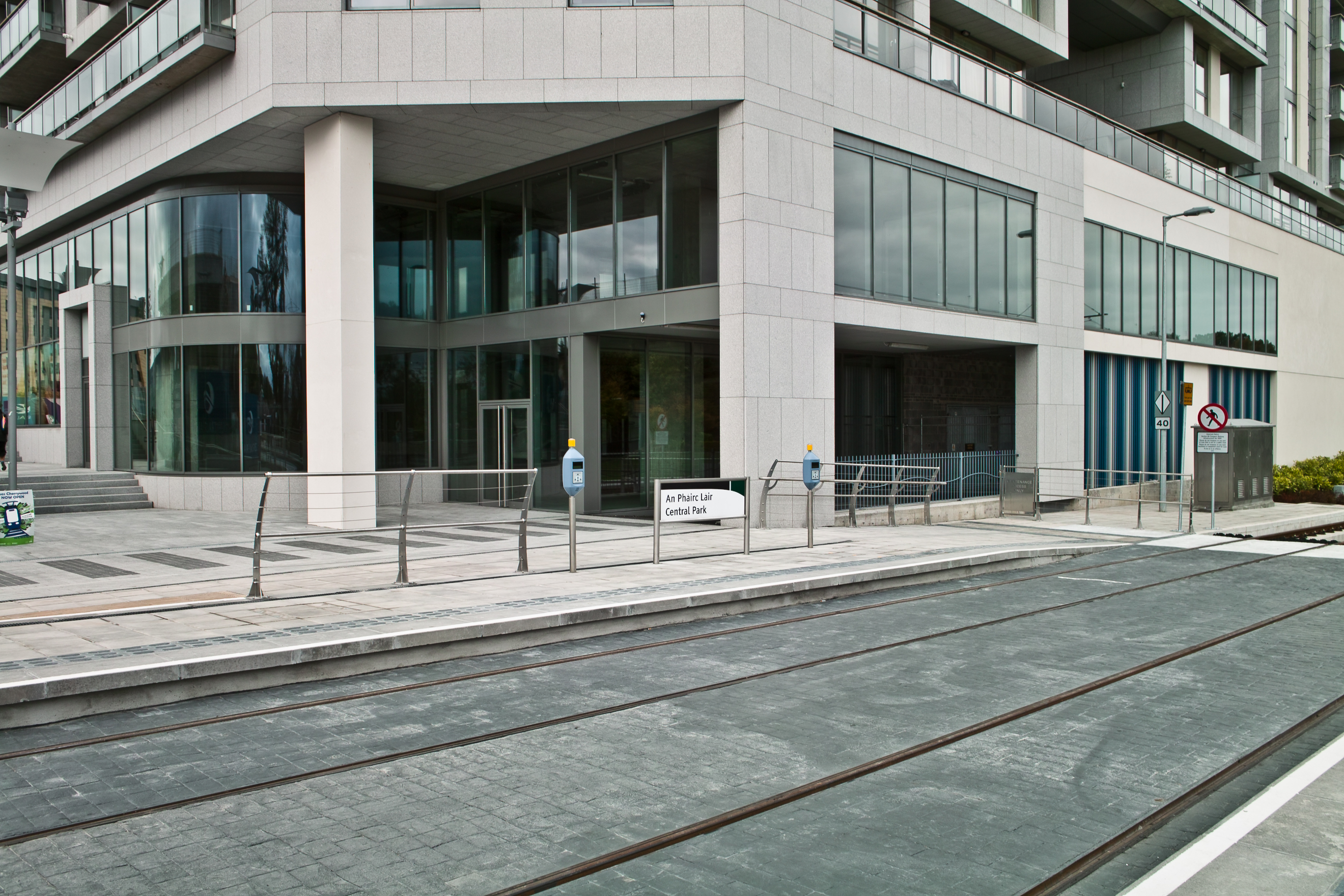
- The Northbound platform with apartments behind it

General information
- Location: County Dublin; Ireland
- Coordinates: 53°16′13″N 6°12′14″W
- Owner: Transport Infrastructure Ireland
- Operator: Luas
- Line: Green
- Platforms: 2

Construction
- Structure type: At-grade

Other information
- Fare zone: Green 4

Key dates
- 16 October 2010: Stop opened

Services
Preceding station	Luas	Following station
Sandyford towards Parnell or Broombridge	Green Line	Glencairn towards Brides Glen
Location
- Location within Dublin

Central Park (Irish: An Pháirc Láir) is a stop on the Luas light-rail tram system in Dún Laoghaire–Rathdown, County Dublin, Ireland. It opened in 2010 as a stop on the extension of the Green Line south from Sandyford to Brides Glen.

== Location and access ==
The stop is located adjacent to a business park of the same name. Leopardstown Park Hospital is on the other side of the stop, and Leopardstown Racecourse and Kilmacud Crokes GAA are also within walking distance.

The stop has two entrances: the northbound platform opens directly onto a public plaza in the centre of the business park, and a specially built pathway connects the southbound platform to an unnamed road leading to the hospital.

To the south of the stop, the tram line slopes upwards, then passes the business park's car park on a viaduct which then takes the line over the M50 motorway. To the north, it cuts through the business park on its own right of way, then crosses a road junction on a curved viaduct and runs alongside Burton Hall Road, which it then crosses, turning onto the side of Blackthorn Avenue, taking it to Sandyford.

== Onward transport ==
The stop is served by Dublin Bus routes 47 and 118, providing connections to Stepaside and Belarmine, as well as further destinations such as Stillorgan and University College Dublin.
