= Kilgobbin Castle (Dublin) =

- Caisleán Chill Ghobáin (Irish)
- Sesson Castle
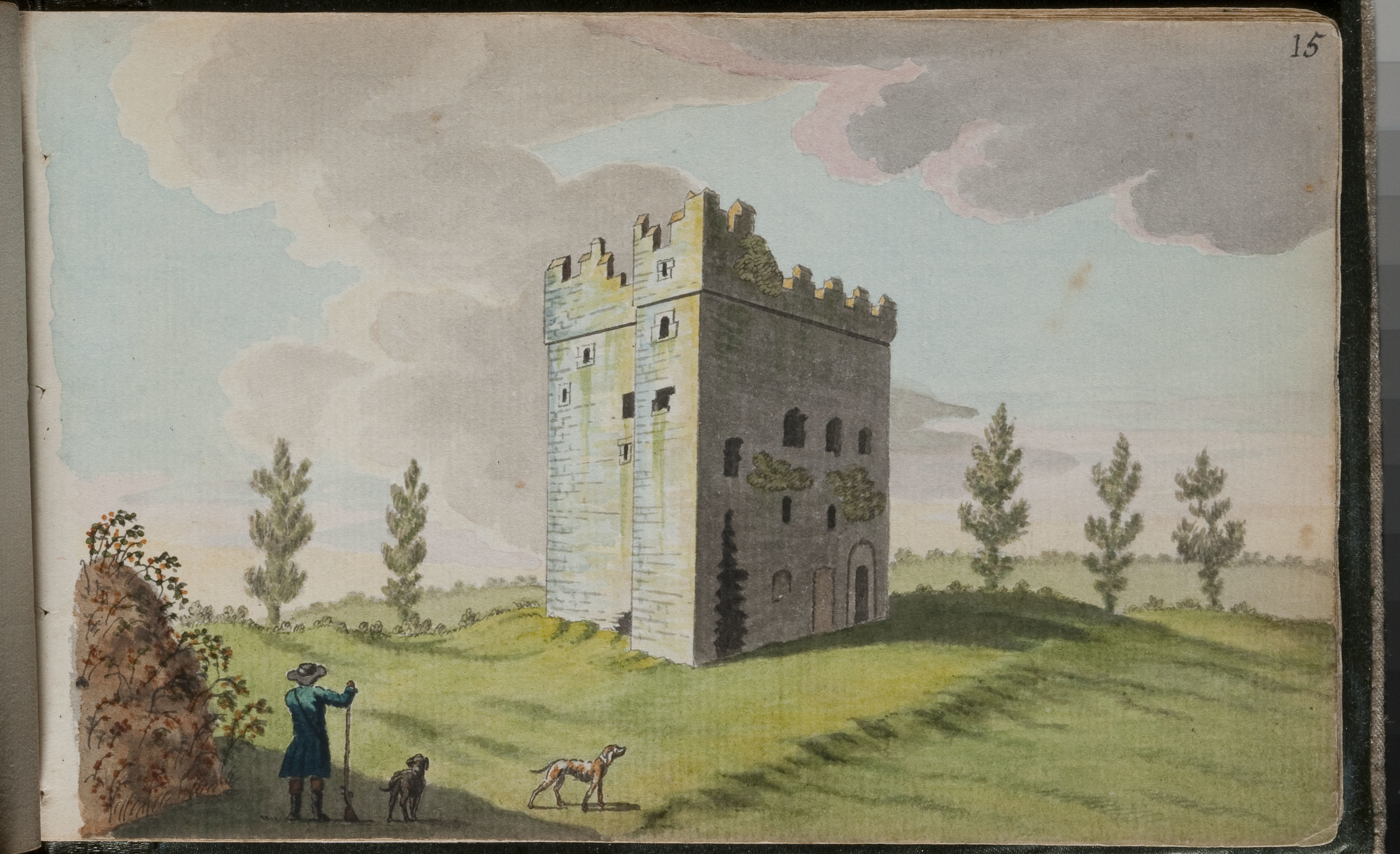
- 18th century sketch of Kilgobbin Castle by Gabriel Beranger

- Location within Dublin Location within Ireland
- 53°15′35″N 6°12′47″W
- Type: tower house
- Location: Kilgobbin Road, Stepaside, Dún Laoghaire–Rathdown, Ireland

History
- Built: c. 1476

Site notes
- Architectural style: Norman

Kilgobbin Castle is a 15th-century tower house in Dublin, Ireland.

== Location ==
Kilgobbin Castle is located to the north of Stepaside and east of Two Rock, guarding the southern approach to Dublin from County Wicklow.

== History ==
Archeological excavations have shown that the site of the tower house was inhabited long before it was built; there is evidence of 11th–12th century metalworking, a 13th-century "plough pebble" and 13th–14th century pottery.

Kilgobbin Castle was built by the Cambro-Norman Walsh family c. 1476, as one of the Pale towers built after King Henry VI, in 1429, awarded a grant of ten pounds to any man who built a castle on the edge of the Pale; it was one of several on the southern edge of The Pale. In 1476 the castle was sacked by the O'Byrnes.

In 1641 the Walshes were dispossessed, with the castle going to Adam Loftus, who then rented it to Mathew Talbot, an officer in the Confederate Irish Army, and the castle was an important site in the Irish Confederate Wars of the 1640s, including a skirmish near the castle in January 1642. After that war it was granted to Dr. John Harding of Trinity College, Dublin. In the 19th century it was owned by the Eustaces, the McDonnells and the judge and scholar Richard Nutley.

It was occupied by several further owners until falling into ruin by the early 19th century. Antiquarian John Lee visited Kilgobbin Castle in 1806–7 and noted it was formerly called Sesson Castle.

Local legend claimed Kilgobbin Castle was haunted by a man in a suit of armor and a woman who carried a bucket of water and rattled coins in her apron.

== Building ==
Early 19th century description of castle, from the Dublin Penny Journal

The castellated fortification is a tall square tower. Only two of the walls are still standing, the north and east walls having collapsed in 1832. The entrance is in the west wall. It is three storeys high with thick granite walls, arrow slits and a vaulted ground floor ceiling. A service tower on the southeast corner contains a spiral staircase and garderobe.
