= Ballyogan Wood Luas stop =

Tram stop in Dublin, Ireland

Ballyogan Wood Coill Bhaile Uí Ógáin
- Platform at Ballyogan Wood

General information
- Location: Ballyogan Road; Ballyogan, County Dublin; Ireland
- Coordinates: 53°15′18″N 6°11′04″W
- Owner: Transport Infrastructure Ireland
- Operator: Transdev (as Luas)
- Line: Green
- Platforms: 2
- Bus routes: 1
- Bus operators: Go-Ahead Ireland
- Connections: L27

Construction
- Structure type: At-grade

Other information
- Fare zone: Green 4

History
- Opened: 16 October 2010
Location
- Location within Dublin

Ballyogan Wood (Irish: Coill Bhaile Ógain) is a stop on the green line of the Luas light-rail tram system in Dún Laoghaire–Rathdown, County Dublin, Ireland. The stop provides access to the nearby residential area of Ballyogan, as well as providing access to the nearby Carrickmines Park.

== History ==
The stop opened in 2010 as a stop on the extension of the Green Line south from Sandyford to Brides Glen.

== Services ==
On average, trams run every 10–15 minutes. Southbound trams all go to Brides Glen. Most trams travelling north continue to the northern terminus at Broombridge, but some terminate at Parnell.

Preceding station	Luas	Following station
Leopardstown Valley towards Parnell or Broombridge	Green Line	Carrickmines towards Brides Glen

== Location and access ==
The stop is located at the side of Ballyogan Road and has edge platforms. To the north of the stop, trams continue along a section of reserved track at the side of Ballyogan Road on their way to Broombridge railway station. To the south, they turn to the left, crossing the M50 motorway on a bridge and re-joining the old Harcourt Street railway alignment before continuing to Brides Glen.

== Onward transport ==
The stop is served by Go-Ahead Ireland route L27. It connects the stop to Carrickmines village and Cabinteely, as well as to further destinations such as Monkstown and Dún Laoghaire.
