= Kilgobbin Cross =

- Ardchros Chill Ghobáin (Irish)
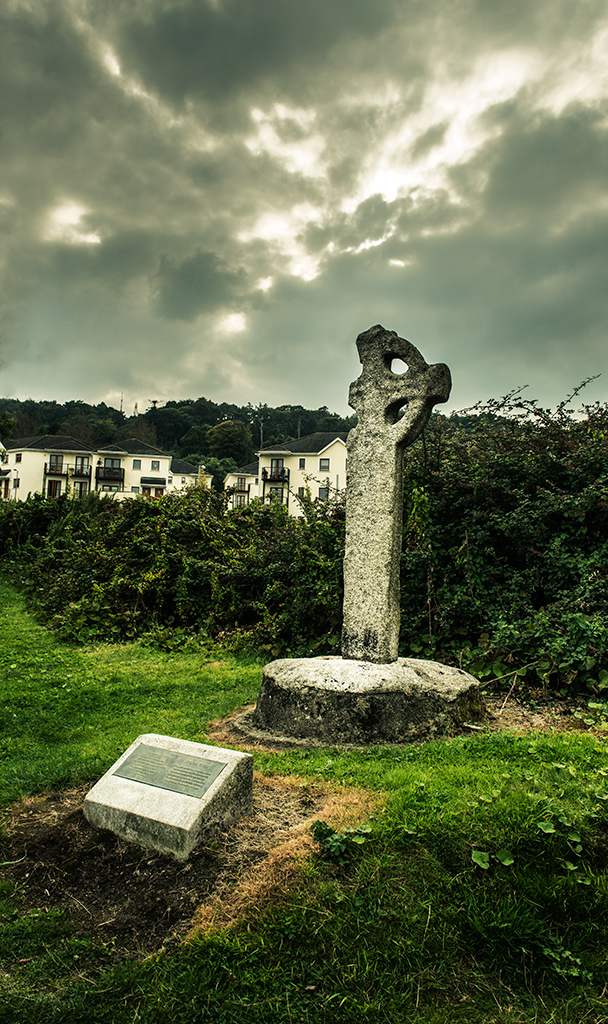

- Location within Dublin
- 53.256478°N 6.217806°W
- Type: High cross
- Location: Kilgobbin Lane, Stepaside, Dún Laoghaire–Rathdown, Ireland

History
- Built: 10th century

Site notes
- Height: 2.5 metres (8.2 ft)

National monument of Ireland
- Official name: Kilgobbin
- Reference no.: 226

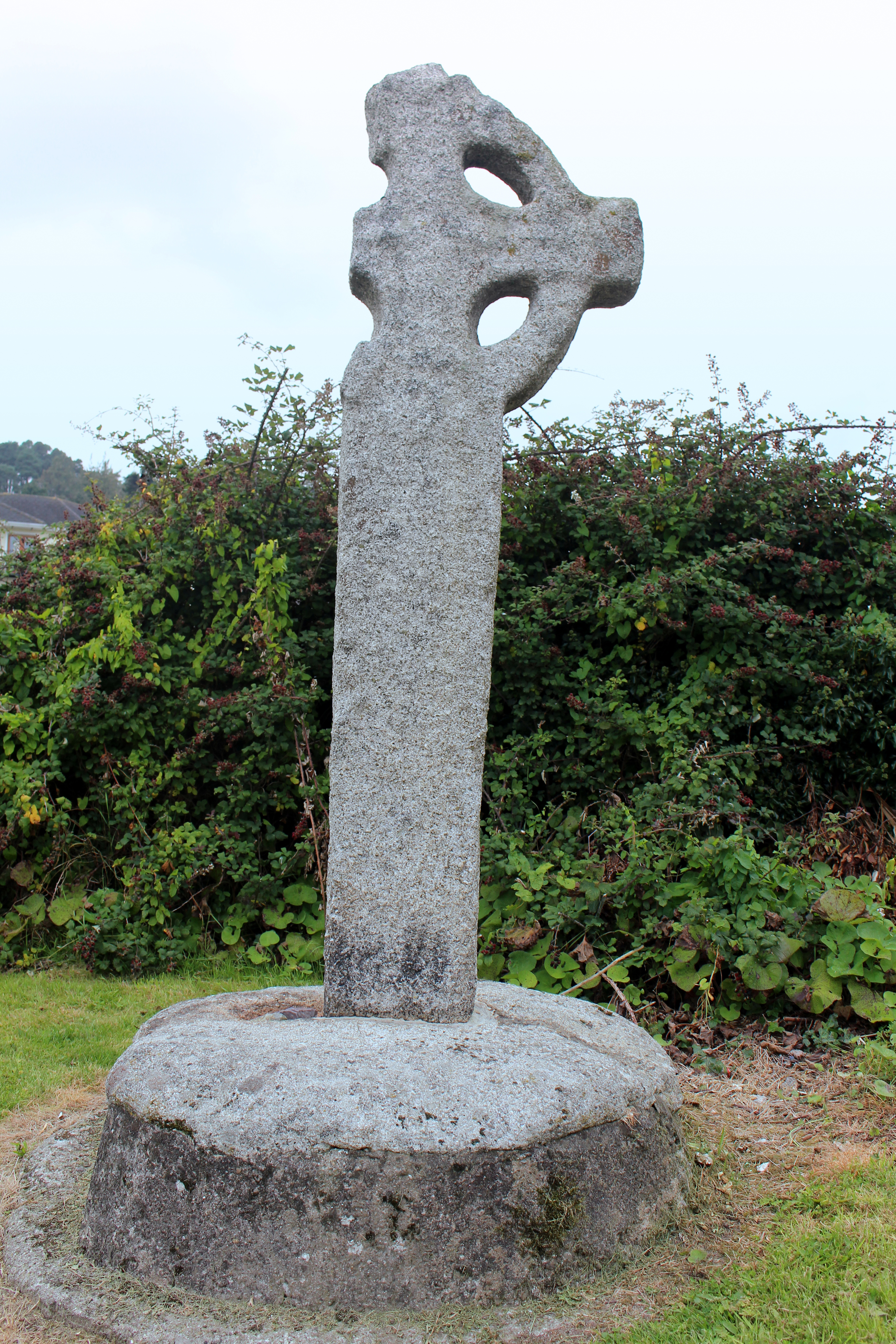
Another image of the cross

Kilgobbin Cross is a high cross and National Monument located in Stepaside, County Dublin, Ireland.

== Location ==
Kilgobbin Cross is located on Kilgobbin Lane, Stepaside, about 450 m (490 yd) north-northwest of Stepaside town centre.

== History ==
The townland of Kilgobbin (Irish: Cill Ghobáin, meaning 'church of Goban') takes its name from a St Goban, of which there appear to have been many in Ireland (the hagiographies are confused). The depiction of Jesus wearing a long cloak places the cross in the 10th century AD. The cross was buried in the graveyard and unearthed c. 1800.

== Description ==
The cross is made of granite and stands 2.4 metres (7.9 ft) high. It is a Celtic cross with one side broken off. An inscription on the east face shows the Crucifixion of Jesus, with Jesus wearing a long robe. Unusually, there is a bullaun stone set into the cross's base.
