= Carrickmines Luas stop =

Rail stop in County Dublin, Ireland

Carrickmines Carraig Mhaighin
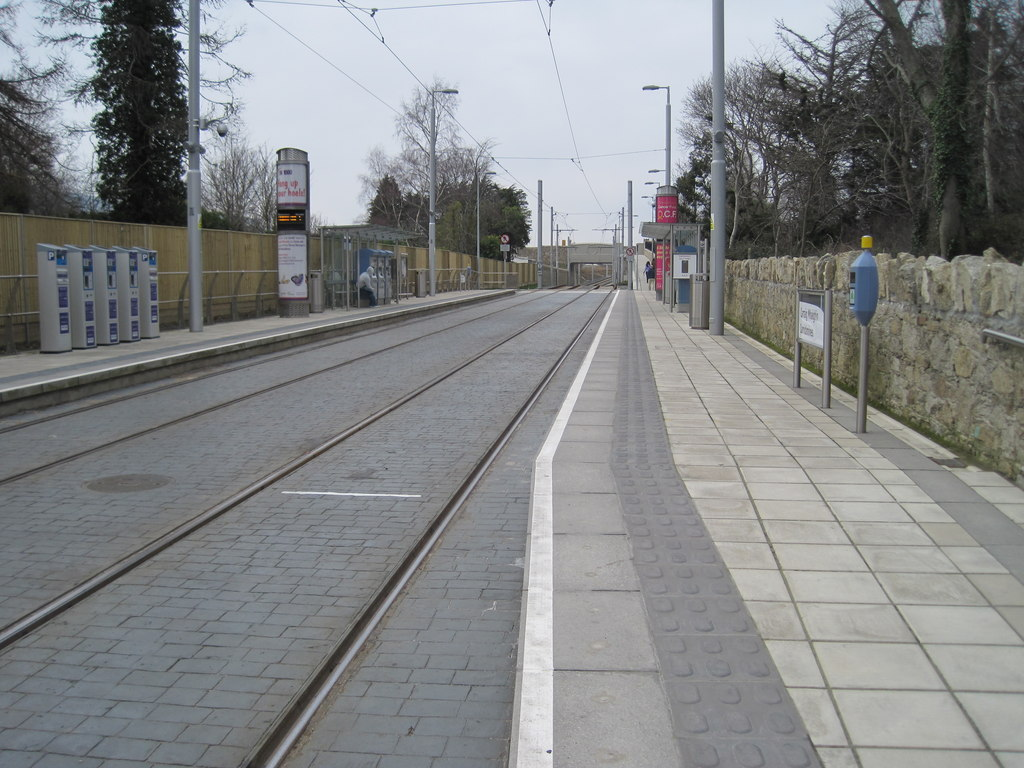

General information
- Location: Glenamuck Road, Carrickmines, County Dublin; Ireland
- Coordinates: 53.25401°N 6.16997°W
- Owner: Transport Infrastructure Ireland
- Operator: Transdev (as Luas)
- Line: Green
- Platforms: 2
- Tracks: 2
- Bus routes: 2
- Bus operators: Go-Ahead Ireland
- Connections: L26; L27

Construction
- Structure type: At-grade
- Parking: Park and ride

Other information
- Fare zone: Green 5

History
- Original company: Dublin, Wicklow and Wexford Railway
- Pre-grouping: Dublin and South Eastern Railway
- Post-grouping: Great Southern Railways

Key dates
- 10 July 1854: Station opened
- 13 December 1951: Station reduced to a halt under Foxrock
- 31 December 1958: Station closed
- 16 October 2010: Luas stop opened
Location
- Location within Dublin

Carrickmines (Irish: Carraig Mhaighin) is a stop on the Luas light rail tram system in Dún Laoghaire–Rathdown, County Dublin, Ireland, which serves the nearby village of Carrickmines. It opened in 2010 and was built on the site of a disused heavy rail station of the same name.

== History ==
=== Railway station (1854–1958) ===
The Harcourt Street railway line was built by the Dublin, Wicklow and Wexford Railway and opened in 1854, running from a temporary terminus at Harcourt Road near the city centre to Bray. Carrickmines was originally one of four intermediate stops on the line along with Dundrum, Stillorgan and Shankill.

The station was located to the east of Glenamuck Road North, which crossed the railway line on an iron bridge. The up platform (for trains towards Dublin) featured a small station building whose design was similar to those of other DWWR buildings, attributed to the line's engineer William Dargan. Passengers accessed this platform through a gateway next to the building. The down platform featured a smaller waiting room and a ramp leading passengers to the road bridge. A water tower was also situated on the up platform.

=== Closure (1959–2010) ===
The Harcourt Street line had declined in use throughout the early 20th century and was becoming rundown in the 1940s and 50s. Carrickmines had been used so little by passengers that it was reduced to a halt under Foxrock in December 1951. After the line continued to dwindle in use, it was closed by CIÉ at the end of 1958, despite objection from the community. The remaining section was used for the filming of Johnny Nobody in May 1960, notably in Tullygates and Carrickmines. The tracks were lifted soon after and all stations on the route were auctioned off.

Carrickmines station building became a private residence. The property included the track bed and both platforms. The waiting room was used as an out building. The water tower, down platform and ramp all survived, and the building continued to be accessed by a driveway leading to the main road. The owners later built an extension to the back of the house, where the rails used to run.

=== Luas construction (2010) ===
In 2010, the Luas Green Line was extended south from Sandyford to Brides Glen. The line mostly uses the same alignment as the Harcourt Street line between Carrickmines and Brides Glen, and Carrickmines was rebuilt as a tram stop.

During construction, the property had to be bought by the Railway Procurement Agency for work to begin. The modern extension was demolished as it was blocking the tracks. The waiting room and ramp were also demolished, the latter being rebuilt. A wall was built to separate the stop from the old station property, and the old alignment had new tracks laid and overhead catenary wired hung. Once work had finished, the station building was once again sold off as a private residence.

At the same time as the construction of the stop, the Glenamuck Road North, which passes the stop was widened. To allow for this, the old iron road bridge was replaced with a modern concrete bridge. The new bridge has high solid parapets. On the sides that face the roads, these parapets are covered with sandstone bricks. This pattern extends along the walls on either side of the road.

== The stop today ==
Carrickmines stop has ticket machines, shelters, displays, and signage of the same design as other Luas stops. One platform is bound by a steel railing, the other by a sandstone wall. The station building can still clearly be seen from the platforms, as can the old water tower, which has fallen into disrepair.

The main entrance is a gap in the wall at Glenamuck Road North. The stop is marked with a solar powered totem featuring the Luas logo, a feature unique to the stop. The entrance has a flat area with a bicycle rack, then connects to a newly built ramp (in the same position as the old DWWR ramp) which leads to the western end of the southbound platform. The stop has a park and ride facility with 362 spaces, of which 13 are for disabled badge holders and 4 have an EV charger. The car park also has a bus stop and turning circle, although as of 2021 this is not used. The car park is accessed from a dedicated turn off of Carrickmines South Roundabout, and a short pathway leads to the northbound platform.

On average, trams run every 10–15 minutes. All southbound trams go to Brides Glen. Most trams travelling north from Carrickmines continue to the northern terminus at Broombridge, but some terminate at Parnell.

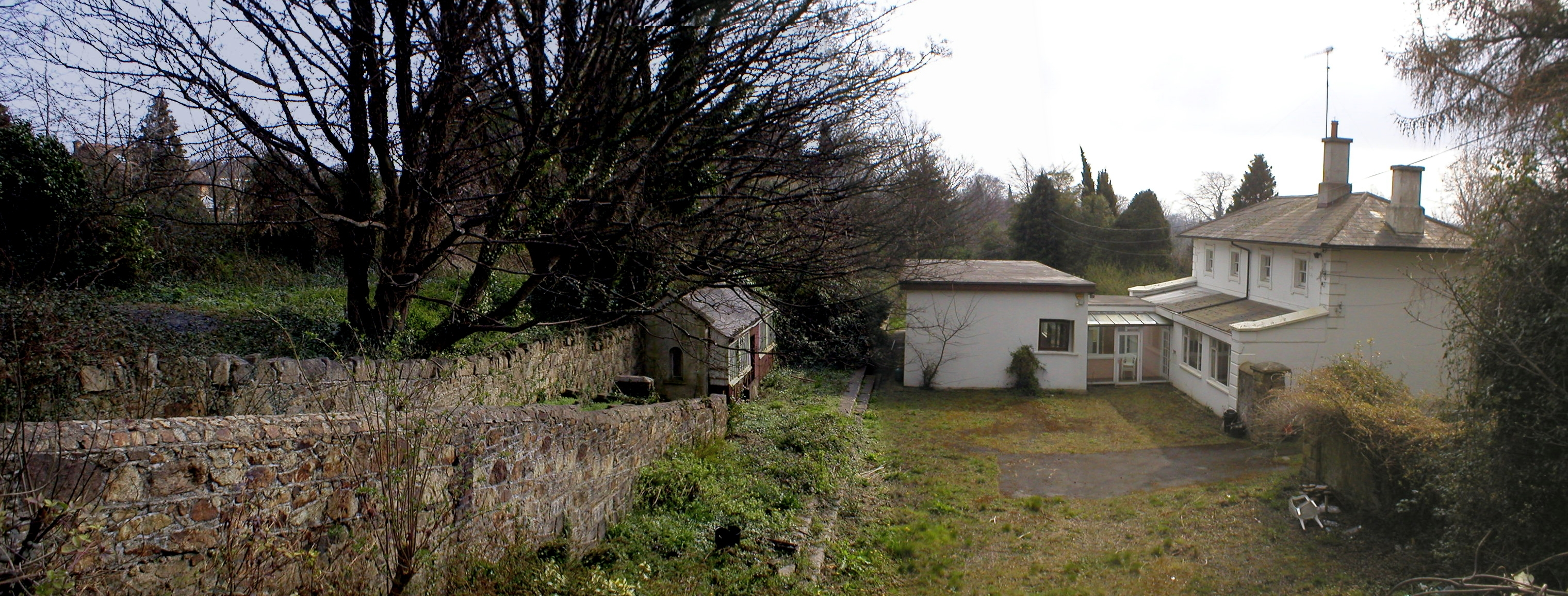
The station in 2007, showing the building, waiting room, down platform and passenger ramp

== Onward transport ==
The stop is served by Go-Ahead Ireland routes L26 and L27. These connect the stop to Carrickmines village and Cabinteely, as well as to further destinations such as Kilternan and Dún Laoghaire.

Preceding station	Luas	Following station
Ballyogan Wood towards Parnell or Broombridge	Green Line	Laughanstown towards Brides Glen
Disused railways
Foxrock; Line and station closed	Dublin and South Eastern Railway; Harcourt Street line	Shankill; Line and station closed
