= Leopardstown Valley Luas stop =

Tram stop in Dublin, Ireland

Leopardstown Valley Gleann Baile na Lobhair
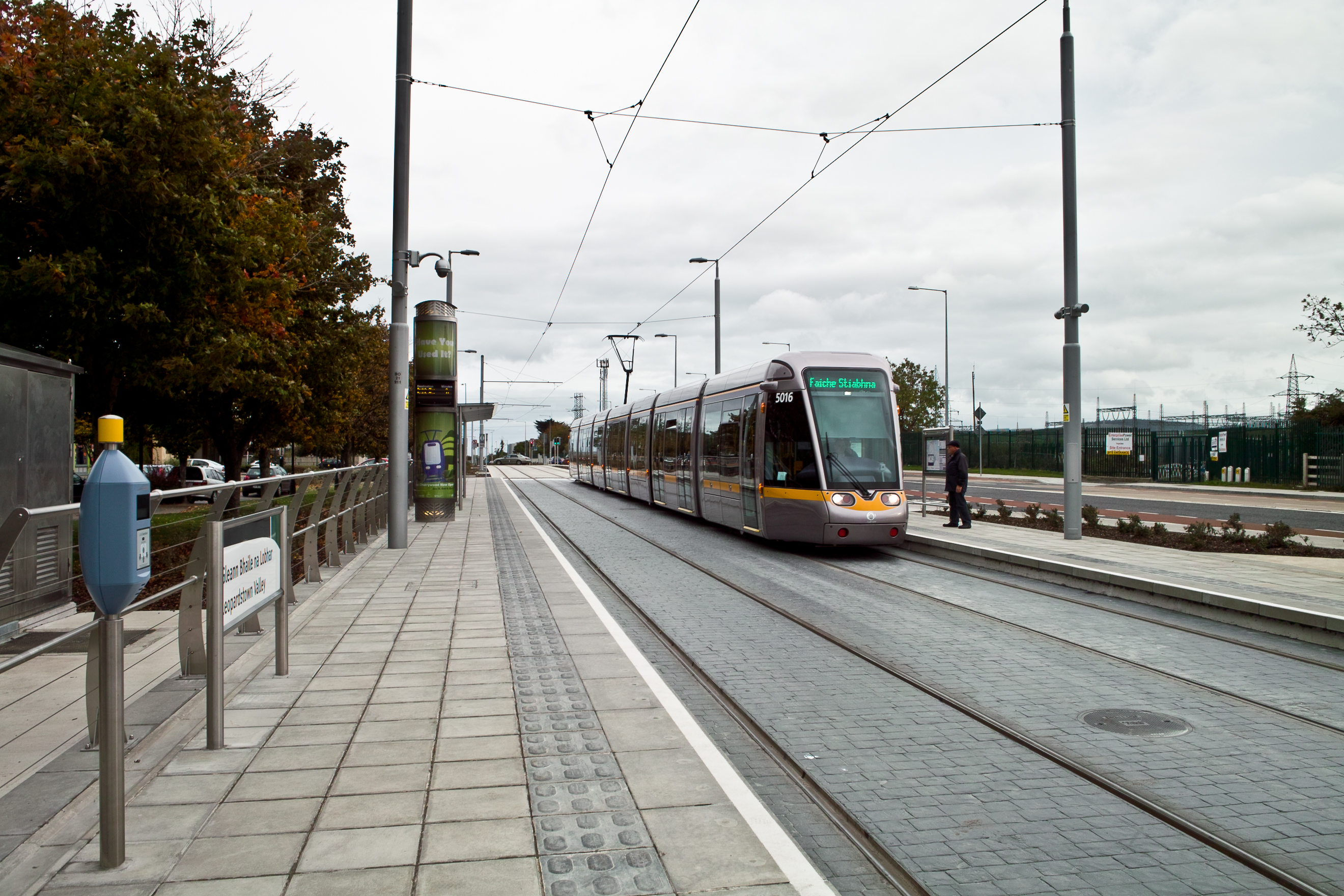
- A tram at Leopardstown Valley

General information
- Location: Dublin; Ireland
- Coordinates: 53°15′30″N 6°11′54″W
- Owner: Transport Infrastructure Ireland
- Operator: Luas
- Line: Green
- Platforms: 2
- Bus routes: 1
- Bus operators: Go-Ahead Ireland
- Connections: L27

Construction
- Structure type: At-grade

Other information
- Fare zone: Green 4

Key dates
- 16 October 2010: Stop opened

Services
Preceding station	Luas	Following station
The Gallops towards Parnell or Broombridge	Green Line	Ballyogan Wood towards Brides Glen
Location
- Location within Dublin

Leopardstown Valley (Irish: Gleann Bhaile na Lobhar) is a stop on the Luas light-rail tram system in Dún Laoghaire–Rathdown, County Dublin, Ireland. It opened in 2010 as a stop on the extension of the Green Line south from Sandyford to Brides Glen. The stop provides access to the nearby residential area of Leopardstown and its eponymous shopping centre.

== Service ==
The stop is located at the side of Ballyogan Road, in the middle of a 2 km (1.2 mi) stretch of reserved track which runs alongside the road.

== Onward transport ==
The stop is served by Go-Ahead Ireland route L27. This route connects the stop to Carrickmines village and Cabinteely, as well as to further destinations such as Monkstown and Dún Laoghaire.
