= Glencairn House =

Historic residence in Dublin, Ireland

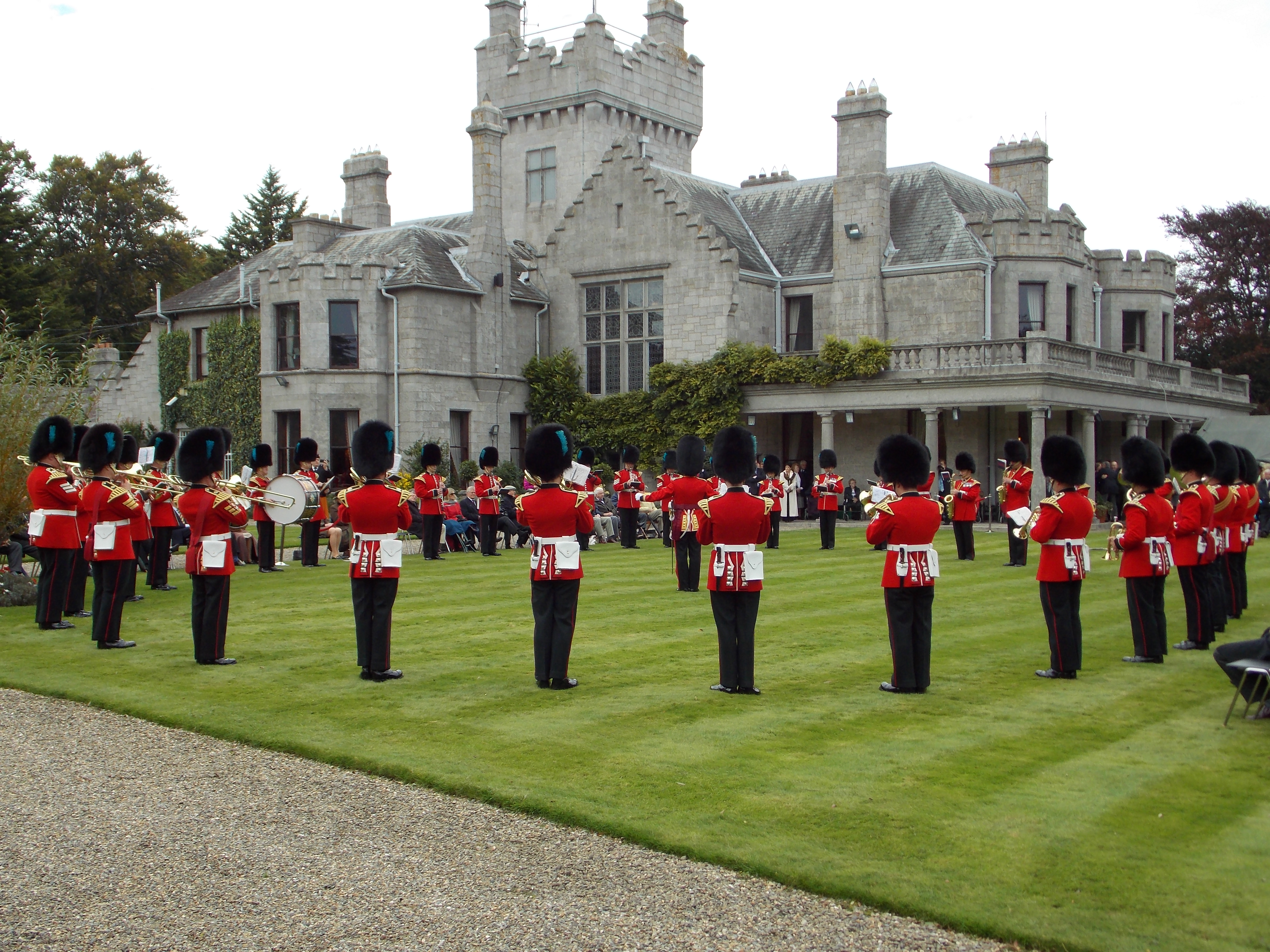

- Location within Dublin

General information
- Status: Ambassador's Residence
- Type: House
- Architectural style: Gothic Revival, Tudor Revival
- Location: Sandyford, Dublin, Ireland
- Coordinates: 53.26625°N 6.20938°W
- Estimated completion: 1861
- Owner: United Kingdom

Technical details
- Material: granite
- Floor count: 3

Design and construction
- Architect: Benjamin Woodward
- Developer: George Gresson

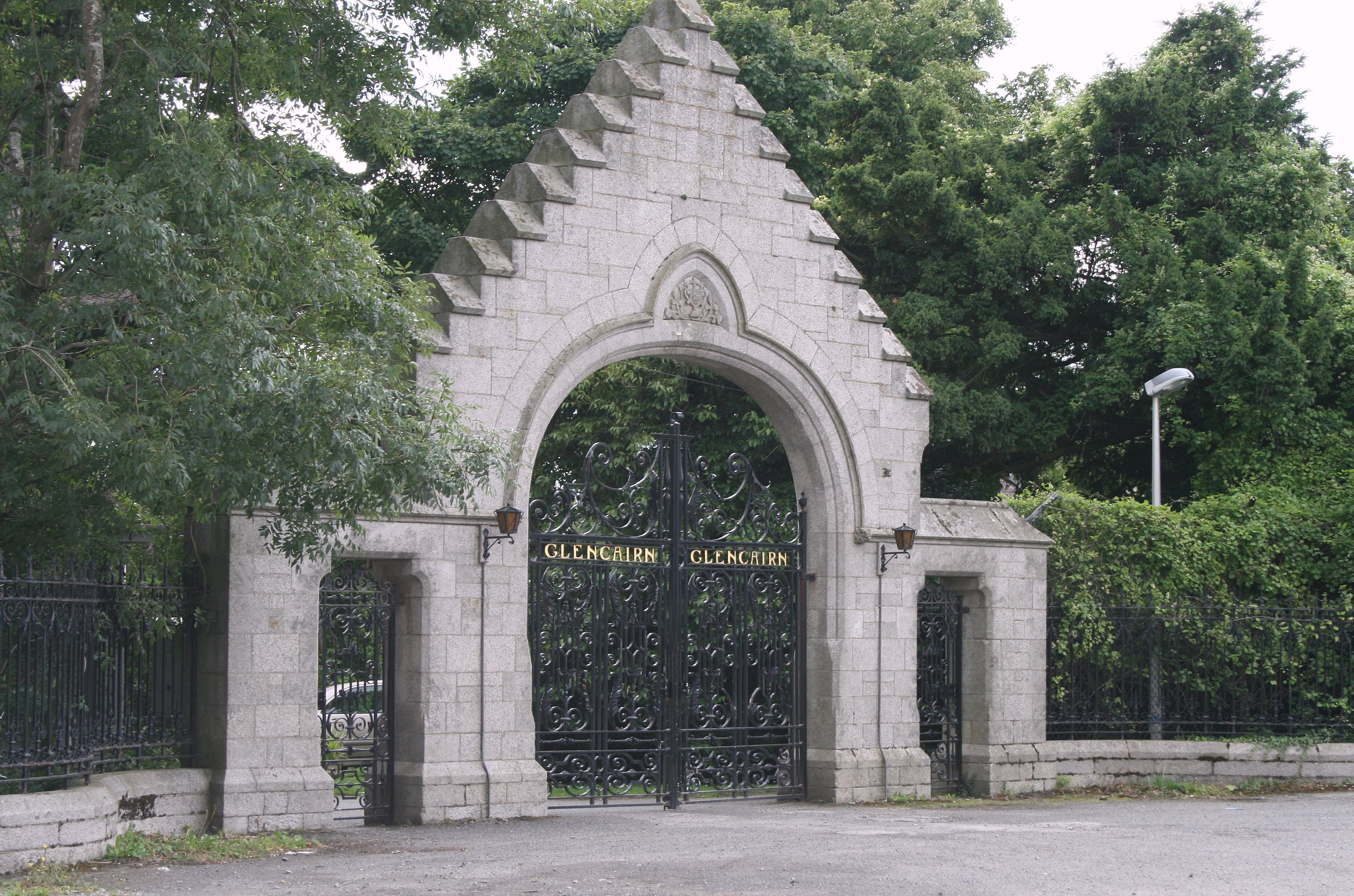
The front gate of Glencairn House on Murphystown Road, in 2008.

Glencairn House is the official residence of the British Ambassador to Ireland. Glencairn has been the official residence of successive ambassadors since the 1950s.

The house is located in the southern suburbs of Dublin, on the Murphystown Road in the Leopardstown area, adjacent to exit 14 of the M50 motorway.

== History ==
At the beginning of the 20th century, the house was owned by Richard Croker, a leading figure from New York's Tammany Hall.

The house and its surrounding estate were sold by the British Foreign and Commonwealth Office in April 1999 for GBP£24 million, without having purchased an alternative residence. In 2000, an alternative site was purchased at nearby Marlay Grange, close to Marlay Park.

The Ambassador continued to live at Glencairn while the Marlay Grange site was refurbished. A subsequent cost appraisal showed that it would in fact be more cost-effective to repurchase Glencairn than to continue with plans to refurbish Marlay Grange, and in 2007 the British Government sold Marlay Grange, without ever having occupied it.

Prior to Richard Croker's ownership, Glencairn was in the Gresson family. It was the home of George Gresson a wealthy Dublin lawyer, son of the Reverend George Leslie Gresson, (1767-1842) Rector of Ardnurcher, County Westmeath, and his first wife Clarissa, daughter of Robert Reynell and his wife Elizabeth Knox, Killynen, County Westmeath. Rev. Gresson was the eldest son of William Gresson (1744-1802) of Hawkswood, Swanlinbar, County Cavan and his wife Margaret Leslie, (marriage articles 29 Dec. 1766) daughter of Henry Leslie (1710-1786) of Nutfield, Aghavea, County Fermanagh, and his first wife Amelia Creichton (married 5 Jan. 1740, Parish of St. Peter and Kevin, Dublin) daughter of John Creichton of Aghalane, Kinawley, County Fermanagh and his wife Henrietta Townley. The Gressons were landowners in County Cavan and County Tyrone. George Gresson built Glencairn House in 1860, died unmarried, 3 Nov. 1876, age 76, buried in the Gresson Family Vault, Tyrellspass, County Westmeath. Rev. George Leslie Gresson and his wife Clarissa Reynell, married in 1798, had ten children: William Reynell 1799, (Rev. William Reynell Gresson (1799-1873) of Larch Vale, near Moneygall, Rector of Burrisnefarney, County Tipperary, married in 1823 Frances Holmes, 5th daughter of Richard Holmes of Prospect and Garryduff, County Westmeath). George 1800 (of Glencairn House), Chapman 1801 (died young), Harriette 1804, Henry Barnes Gresson 1809, Clarissa 1811, Richard 1813 (died unmarried, 7 May 1838, age 25), Robert Christmas 1817, Eleanor 1819, and finally Skelton. (Skelton Robert Gresson, of Castle Street, Liverpool, Lancashire, beneficiary to his brother's will, George of Glencairn House). In 1826, George Leslie Gresson married Mary Anne Turpin and they had five children: Charles, John, Henrietta Elizabeth, Mary Ann, and Alicia in 1835. Their son John George Gresson, Cleric, Schoolmaster, married Eleanor Sophia Haygarth 12 January 1865 at Reading, Berkshire, England: they entrusted their son Arthur George to John Langdon Down, who pioneered research for those persons with developmental and intellectual disabilities at his home called Normansfield, near Teddington, an affluent riverside area of southwest London. Arthur George Gresson made his home here for many years with Dr. Down and his family. The syndrome became known worldwide as Down's syndrome).

From the Gressons ownership of Glencairn passed to James Murphy, judge of the High Court.

The judge was noted for his "warm-hearted hospitality", and in his time Glencairn was one of the centres of Dublin social life. On his death in 1901 his heirs sold it to Croker.

== Luas halt ==
The sale of the land facilitated the acquisition of a railway corridor for an extension of the Luas Sandyford (Green) line to Cherrywood. It runs in front of the gate (see the image above) and gatehouse of the Ambassador's residence. It began operating in 2010, and a stop/station on the line is built near the gate. The stop is called Glencairn.

== See also ==
- Christopher Ewart-Biggs
- Embassy of the United Kingdom, Dublin
