= Dublinbikes =

Bike-share system in Dublin, Ireland

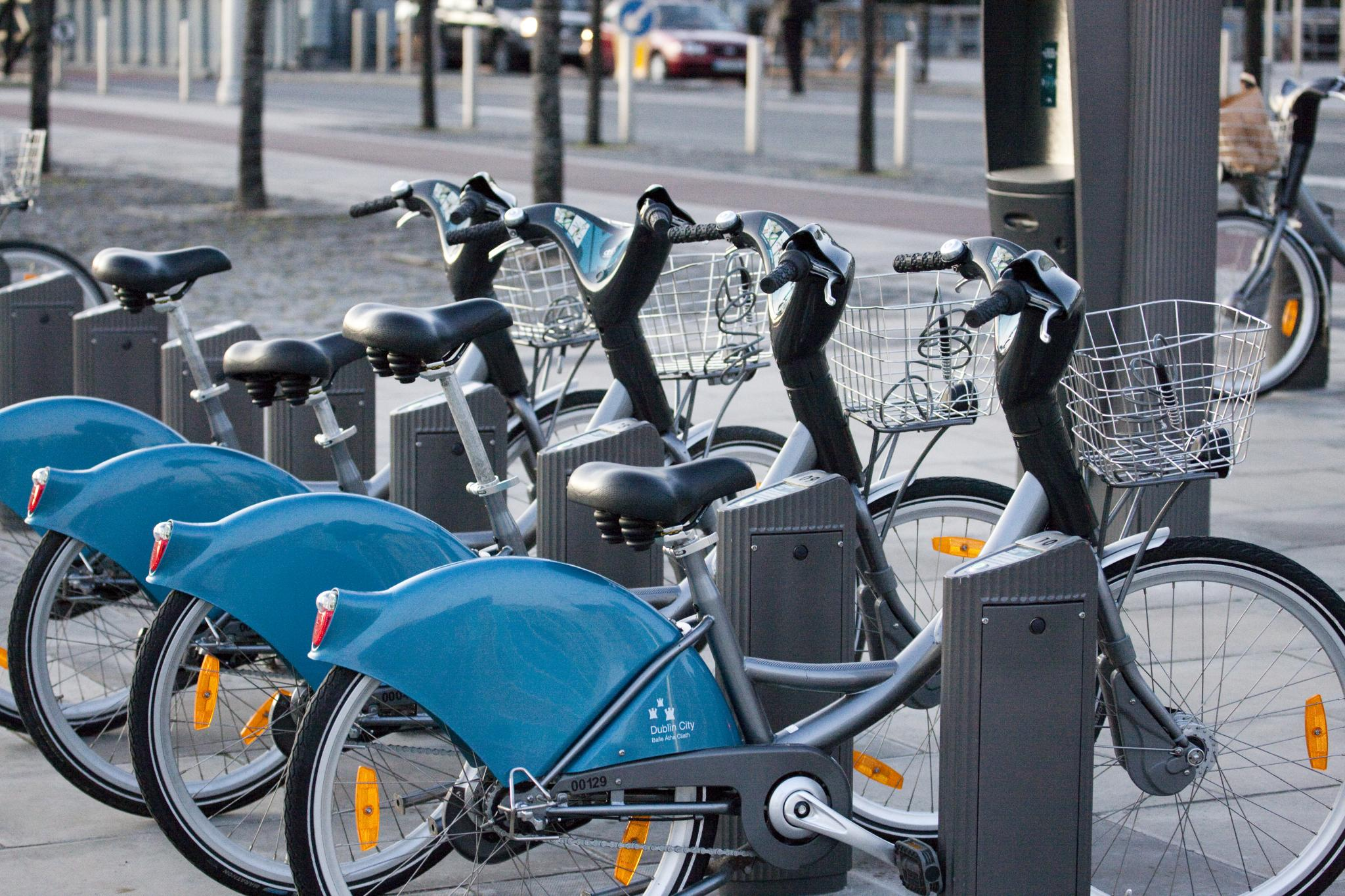
- A Dublinbikes docking station

Overview
- Locale: Dublin, Ireland
- Transit type: Bicycle-sharing system
- Number of stations: 115
- Daily ridership: 42,000 annual subscribers
- Website: dublinbikes.ie

Operation
- Began operation: September 13, 2009; 17 years ago
- Operator: JCDecaux

Dublinbikes (styled "dublinbikes") is a public bicycle rental scheme which has operated in the city of Dublin since 2009. At its launch, the scheme, which is sponsored by JCDecaux, used 450 French-made unisex bicycles with 40 stations. By 2011, this had expanded to 550 bicycles and 44 stations, and in 2013 it was announced that a major expansion of the scheme would add a further 950 bikes and another 58 hire points. Dublin was the 17th city to implement such a scheme, and it was considered one of the most successful bike-sharing schemes in the world; however, progress later stalled, with only 2 of 14 phases being rolled out.

As of 2016 the scheme lost €376,000 a year, leading to further expansion of Dublin Bikes being put on hold.

== History ==
The scheme was announced by Dublin City Council in 2006 when JCDecaux received 72 free advertising spaces around Dublin in a 15-year deal in return for the advertising company's funding of the project. Critics argued that the deal was an expensive one when compared to Copenhagen where companies pay to have their logos attached to the bicycle. 450 bicycle stands were installed in groups of ten and twenty in forty locations around Dublin from June 2009. The scheme was opposed by An Taisce who said it was "misuse of legislation by a local authority to facilitate a private development".

The Dublinbikes scheme was launched on 13 September 2009, with around 150 ordinary cyclists embarking on their first ride behind John Tierney, Dublin City Manager, and Andrew Montague, a councillor who was representing the Lord Mayor of Dublin on the journey.

It was announced on 18 June 2014 that Coca-Cola Zero would become a commercial partner with Dublinbikes for three years. Starting at the end of June 2014, the brand was renamed Coca-Cola Zero Dublinbikes and the Coca-Cola Zero brand was added to each individual bike in return for investment in the scheme.

On 20 July 2017, Just Eat took over as the commercial partner for the next three years. Just Eat invested €2.25 million in the scheme over the three-year period. This is a 15% increase on the Coca-Cola Zero investment in order to help the profitability and expansion of the service. The brand was therefore renamed Just Eat dublinbikes and all 1,500 bikes had the new branding applied to them by August 2017. As part of the announcement, it was confirmed that an additional 15 stations would open in the city (predominantly around Grangegorman) and 100 bikes would be added to the network.

On 9 December 2020, Dublin City Council and JCDecaux announced that Now TV would become the next sponsor of Dublinbikes, in a deal worth €2.25 million over three years. The Now TV partnership comes with the release of a new app that will allow users to release a bike from their smartphone.

== Progress ==
The scheme proved to be a great success, much exceeding predictions. Approximately 1,000 people used the bicycles in the first six hours, with a further 1,000 people having subscribed to use them. Some 11,000 people applied in the first fortnight and Dublin City Council's supply of subscriber cards was reduced to zero, with the Council having initially targeted a 5,000-person uptake in the first year. More than 25,000 people had applied to take part in the scheme by March 2010. Minister for the Environment, Heritage and Local Government John Gormley said after the launch this level of uptake indicated the new "mainstream" approach to cycling in Ireland.

In the first 10 months of the scheme there were over 37,000 users, over 828,000 journeys, no crashes, no vandalism, and only one bike missing (which was recovered).

On 10 May 2010 (post-launch), city councillors in Dublin voted for more advertising hoardings to be used to help with payments, with more than 30,000 people having subscribed (1,500 was the predicted number of subscribers for this stage of the project). On 14 August 2010, it was announced that the scheme had reached its one millionth trip. By May 2011, two million journeys had been made and the scheme had expanded to 550 bicycles and 44 stations. In 2013 it was announced that a major expansion of the scheme would add a further 950 bikes and another 58 hire points.

Subscribers
Date	Long term	Total journeys (cumulative)
18 April 2010	21,134	556,497
May 2011	33,643	2,003,105
20 April 2012		3,500,000
12 January 2013		4,674,277
27 November 2013	36,636	6,037,199
13 September 2014	46,695	7,951,866
30 April 2015	54,808	10,568,398
16 May 2016	60,187	14,705,855
20 July 2017	66,883	19,811,383
21 March 2018	67,890	22,417,162

== Cost to users ==
To use the system, users need to take out a subscription, which allows the subscriber an unlimited number of rentals. Subscriptions can get a Long Term Hire Card costing €35, or a 3-day ticket costing €5. Users also authorise Dublin Bikes to charge €150 from their credit card if the bike is not returned. The first half-hour of every journey is free, after that a service charge applies. See below for pricing structure:

Time	30 min	1 hr	2 hrs	3 hrs	4 hrs
Rate	Free	€0.50	€1.50	€3.50	€6.50

After 4 hours, every extra 30 minutes costs €2. In practice, the system is virtually free at the point of use for Long Term subscribers as over 95% of journeys last less than 30 minutes.

Dublinbikes only accepts Chip and PIN (or other compatible EMV cards), and will not accept magnetic stripe cards such as those used in the United States.

== Service ==
The robust bicycles are produced by the French bicycle company Mercier in Hungary and are repaired by JCDecaux. They are three-speed bicycles, fitted with Shimano Nexus gears which can be changed up and down using a twist/grip shifter on the right handlebar. A Shimano hub dynamo in the front wheel generates power for front and rear always-on LED lighting. The bikes are fitted with Schwalbe Marathon tyres. Other components include a locking system, an adjustable cushioned saddle, a front bicycle basket, a kick stand and a bell.

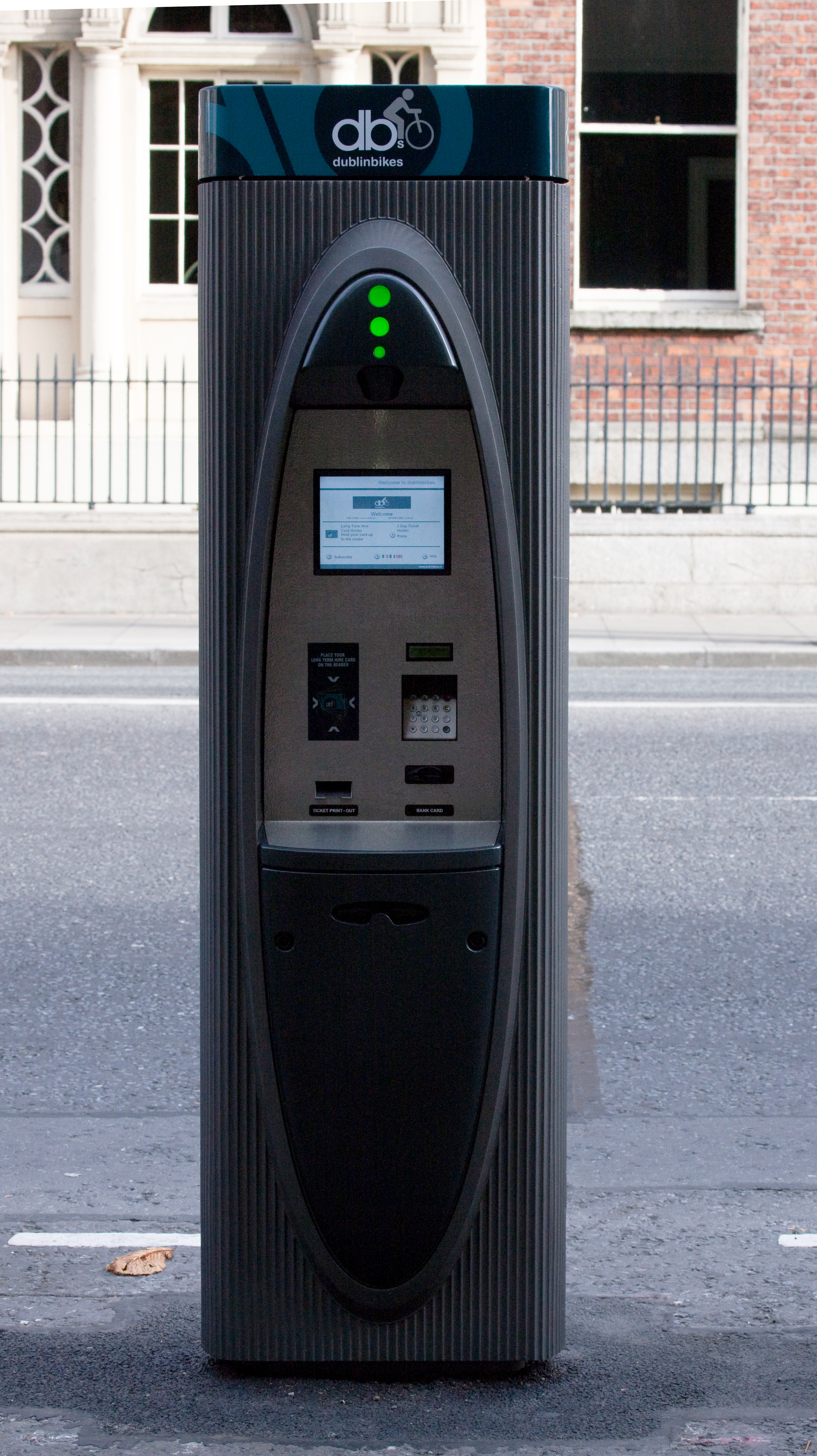
A Dublinbikes terminal

Each station is equipped with an automatic rental terminal and stands for 20 to 40 bicycles. Initially, fourteen terminals had credit card facilities enabling the user to purchase a 3-Day Ticket.

If a user arrives with a rented bicycle at a station without open spots, the terminal grants another fifteen minutes of free rental time. The rental terminals also display information about neighbouring Dublinbikes stations, including location, number of available bicycles and open stands. A fleet of bicycle-transporting vehicles are used to redistribute bicycles between empty and full stations.

== Future ==
In November 2010, a major five-year expansion plan was adopted due to the huge success of the scheme thus far. The plan called for the number bikes increase from 450 to 5,000 and the number of bike stations increase from 40 to 300. The scheme was to be extended as far north as DCU, as far south as UCD, as far east as Sandymount and as far west as Inchicore. The expansion will be funded differently than the original scheme, most likely through a mix of public and private funding.

In July 2012 it was announced that the first part of the scheme would begin before the end of the year.

== Stations ==
When launched in 2009 there was a total of 40 bike stations and 450 bikes. There was a small expansion completed in 2011, adding four new stations and an extra 100 bikes. In April 2013 expansion plans were announced to expand the network to 102 stations and increasing the number of bikes from 550 to 1500. In March 2018, it was confirmed that the service would expand from 101 stations to 116 and from 1,500 bikes to 1,600.

Name	Station #	Spaces	Opened	Location
Avondale Road	108	40	6 June 2018	53.35945°N 6.27616°W
Barrow Street	70	40	22 April 2014	53.34164°N 6.23622°W
Benson Street	90	40	21 February 2014	53.34404°N 6.23347°W
Blackhall Place	88	30	8 May 2014	53.34879°N 6.28165°W
Blessington Street	2	20	13 September 2009	53.35680°N 6.26818°W
Bolton Street	3	20	13 September 2009	53.35108°N 6.26983°W
Brookfield Road	84	30	26 May 2014	53.33902°N 6.30018°W
Buckingham Street Lower	109	30	5 October 2018	53.35334°N 6.24934°W
Cathal Brugha Street	24	20	13 September 2009	53.35208°N 6.26056°W
Charlemont Street	5	40	13 September 2009	53.33069°N 6.25996°W
Charleville Road	107	40	6 June 2018	53.35916°N 6.28185°W
Christchurch Place	6	20	13 September 2009	53.34341°N 6.27003°W
City Quay	99	30	27 March 2014	53.34666°N 6.24616°W
Clarendon Row	1	31	13 September 2009	53.34090°N 6.26233°W
Clonmel Street	54	33	27 November 2013	53.33609°N 6.26239°W
Collins Barracks Museum	87	38	5 August 2014	53.34750°N 6.28522°W
Convention Centre	65	40	28 November 2013	53.34739°N 6.23864°W
Custom House	23	30	13 September 2009	53.34822°N 6.25400°W
Custom House Quay	8	30	13 September 2009	53.34804°N 6.24791°W
Dame Street	10	16	13 September 2009	53.34400°N 6.26652°W
Denmark Street Great	59	20	3 March 2014	53.35559°N 6.26113°W
Deverell Place	45	30	27 November 2013	53.35144°N 6.25523°W
Earlsfort Terrace	11	30	13 September 2009	53.33447°N 6.25837°W
Eccles Street	12	20	13 September 2009	53.35918°N 6.26932°W
Eccles Street East	79	27	8 May 2014	53.35810°N 6.26560°W
Emmet Road	83	40		53.34071°N 6.30815°W
Exchequer Street	9	24	13 September 2009	53.34304°N 6.26356°W
Excise Walk	48	40	27 November 2013	53.34796°N 6.24801°W
Fenian Street	63	35	27 November 2013	53.34148°N 6.24660°W
Fitzwilliam Square East	89	40	15 April 2014	53.33520°N 6.25092°W
Fitzwilliam Square West	13	30	13 September 2009	53.33588°N 6.25270°W
Francis Street	73	30	22 April 2014	53.34210°N 6.27523°W
Frederick Street South	98	30		53.34147°N 6.25678°W
Fownes Street Upper	14	30	13 September 2009	53.34455°N 6.26359°W
George's Lane	50	40	27 March 2018	53.35016°N 6.27974°W
Georges Quay	16	20	13 September 2009	53.34747°N 6.25232°W
Golden Lane	17	20	13 September 2009	53.34076°N 6.26752°W
Grand Canal Dock	69	40	21 February 2014	53.34283°N 6.23842°W
Grangegorman Lower (Central)	104	40	27 March 2018	53.35518°N 6.27838°W
Grangegorman Lower (North)	105	36	27 March 2018	53.35596°N 6.27833°W
Grangegorman Lower (South)	103	40	27 March 2018	53.35466°N 6.27866°W
Grantham Street	18	30	13 September 2009	53.33407°N 6.26547°W
Grattan Street	57	23	27 November 2013	53.33959°N 6.24369°W
Greek Street	4	20	13 September 2009	53.34687°N 6.27303°W
Guild Street	49	40	11 August 2014	53.34797°N 6.24091°W
Hanover Quay	68	40	21 February 2014	53.34410°N 6.23708°W
Harcourt Terrace	41	20	6 January 2011	53.33257°N 6.25783°W
Hardwicke Place	61	25	15 April 2014	53.35708°N 6.26315°W
Hardwicke Street	15	16	13 September 2009	53.35563°N 6.26432°W
Hatch Street	55	36	29 August 2014	53.33404°N 6.26076°W
Herbert Place	19	30	13 September 2009	53.33474°N 6.24514°W
Herbert Street	47	40	3 November 2014	53.33576°N 6.24553°W
Heuston Bridge (North)	92	40	5 August 2014	53.34784°N 6.29241°W
Heuston Bridge (South)	100	25	5 August 2014	53.34710°N 6.29203°W
Heuston Station (Car Park)	94	40	5 August 2014	53.34699°N 6.29779°W
Heuston Station (Central)	93	40	5 August 2014	53.34662°N 6.29688°W
High Street	7	29	13 September 2009	53.34344°N 6.27462°W
James Street	75	40	25 August 2014	53.34346°N 6.28738°W
James Street East	20	30	13 September 2009	53.33652°N 6.24800°W
Jervis Street	40	21	13 September 2009	53.34825°N 6.26649°W
John Street West	72	31	8 May 2014	53.34310°N 6.27716°W
Kevin Street	71	40	5 August 2014	53.33778°N 6.26774°W
Killarney Street	115	30	6 September 2018	53.35486°N 6.24757°W
Kilmainham Gaol	97	40	29 August 2014	53.34211°N 6.31001°W
Kilmainham Lane	96	30		53.34178°N 6.30509°W
King Street North	101	30	3 June 2014	53.35029°N 6.27347°W
Leinster Street South	21	30	13 September 2009	53.34212°N 6.25435°W
Lime Street	62	40	30 January 2014	53.34604°N 6.24363°W
Market Street South	76	38	10 July 2014	53.34237°N 6.28767°W
Mater Hospital	78	40	23 July 2014	53.36009°N 6.26482°W
Merrion Square East	25	30	13 September 2009	53.33908°N 6.24696°W
Merrion Square South	113	40	21 August 2018	53.33860°N 6.24863°W
Merrion Square West	26	20	13 September 2009	53.33994°N 6.25169°W
Molesworth Street	27	20	13 September 2009	53.34122°N 6.25753°W
Mount Brown	82	22	26 May 2014	53.34166°N 6.29718°W
Mountjoy Square East	111	40	20 June 2018	53.35675°N 6.25628°W
Mountjoy Square West	28	30	13 September 2009	53.35638°N 6.25859°W
Mount Street Lower	56	40	27 November 2013	53.33788°N 6.24160°W
New Central Bank	66	40	17 January 2014	53.34715°N 6.23419°W
Newman House	53	40	7 April 2014	53.33705°N 6.26007°W
North Circular Road	60	30	26 March 2014	53.35965°N 6.26049°W
North Circular Road (O'Connell's)	112	30	6 June 2018	53.35784°N 6.25156°W
Oliver Bond Street	74	30	8 May 2014	53.34393°N 6.28051°W
Ormond Quay Upper	29	29	13 September 2009	53.34608°N 6.26827°W
Parkgate Street	86	38	5 August 2014	53.34799°N 6.29188°W
Parnell Square North	30	20	13 September 2009	53.35373°N 6.26533°W
Parnell Street	31	20	13 September 2009	53.35079°N 6.26554°W
Pearse Street	32	30	13 September 2009	53.34430°N 6.25063°W
Phibsborough Road	110	40	20 June 2018	53.35635°N 6.27371°W
Princes Street / O'Connell Street	33	23	13 September 2009	53.34900°N 6.26049°W
Portobello Harbour	34	30	13 September 2009	53.33037°N 6.26510°W
Portobello Road	43	30	9 March 2011	53.33002°N 6.26817°W
Rathdown Road	106	40	6 June 2018	53.35893°N 6.28036°W
Royal Hospital	95	40	29 August 2014	53.34388°N 6.29706°W
Sandwith Street	64	40	24 January 2014	53.34524°N 6.24753°W
Sir Patrick Dun's Hospital	58	40	7 April 2014	53.33926°N 6.24077°W
Smithfield	35	30	13 September 2009	53.34742°N 6.27822°W
Smithfield North	42	30	6 January 2011	53.34963°N 6.27780°W
South Dock Road	91	30	22 April 2014	53.34185°N 6.23128°W
St. James's Hospital (Central)	81	40	26 May 2014	53.33997°N 6.29562°W
St. James's Hospital (Luas)	80	40	10 July 2014	53.34136°N 6.29293°W
Strand Street Great	46	35	27 November 2013	53.34713°N 6.26384°W
St. Stephen's Green East	36	40	13 September 2009	53.33783°N 6.25611°W
St. Stephen's Green South	37	30	13 September 2009	53.33749°N 6.26169°W
Talbot Street	38	40	13 September 2009	53.35106°N 6.25266°W
The Point	67	40	17 January 2014	53.34685°N 6.23076°W
Townsend Street	22	20	13 September 2009	53.34593°N 6.25455°W
Upper Sherrard Street	44	30	9 March 2011	53.35841°N 6.26049°W
Western Way	102	40	10 July 2014	53.35494°N 6.26940°W
Wilton Terrace	39	20	13 September 2009	53.33230°N 6.25271°W
Wilton Terrace (Park)	114	40	21 August 2018	53.33365°N 6.24834°W
Wolfe Tone Street	77	29	3 June 2014	53.34886°N 6.26741°W
York Street (East)	52	32	27 November 2013	53.33874°N 6.26206°W
York Street (West)	51	40	27 November 2013	53.33931°N 6.26477°W

== Alternatives ==
In May 2018, Dublin City Council granted licenses to two operators, Urbo and BleeperBike, to run a new, stationless bike-sharing scheme, with "full interoperability between the two schemes". In 2019, the second licence has been re-advertised after Urbo never launched their bikes in Dublin. The Irish company Moby won the second license and is expected to launch a fleet of electrically assisted bikes by 2020.

== See also ==
- List of bicycle-sharing systems
