= Glencairn Luas stop =

Tram stop in Dublin, Ireland

Glencairn Gleann an Chairn
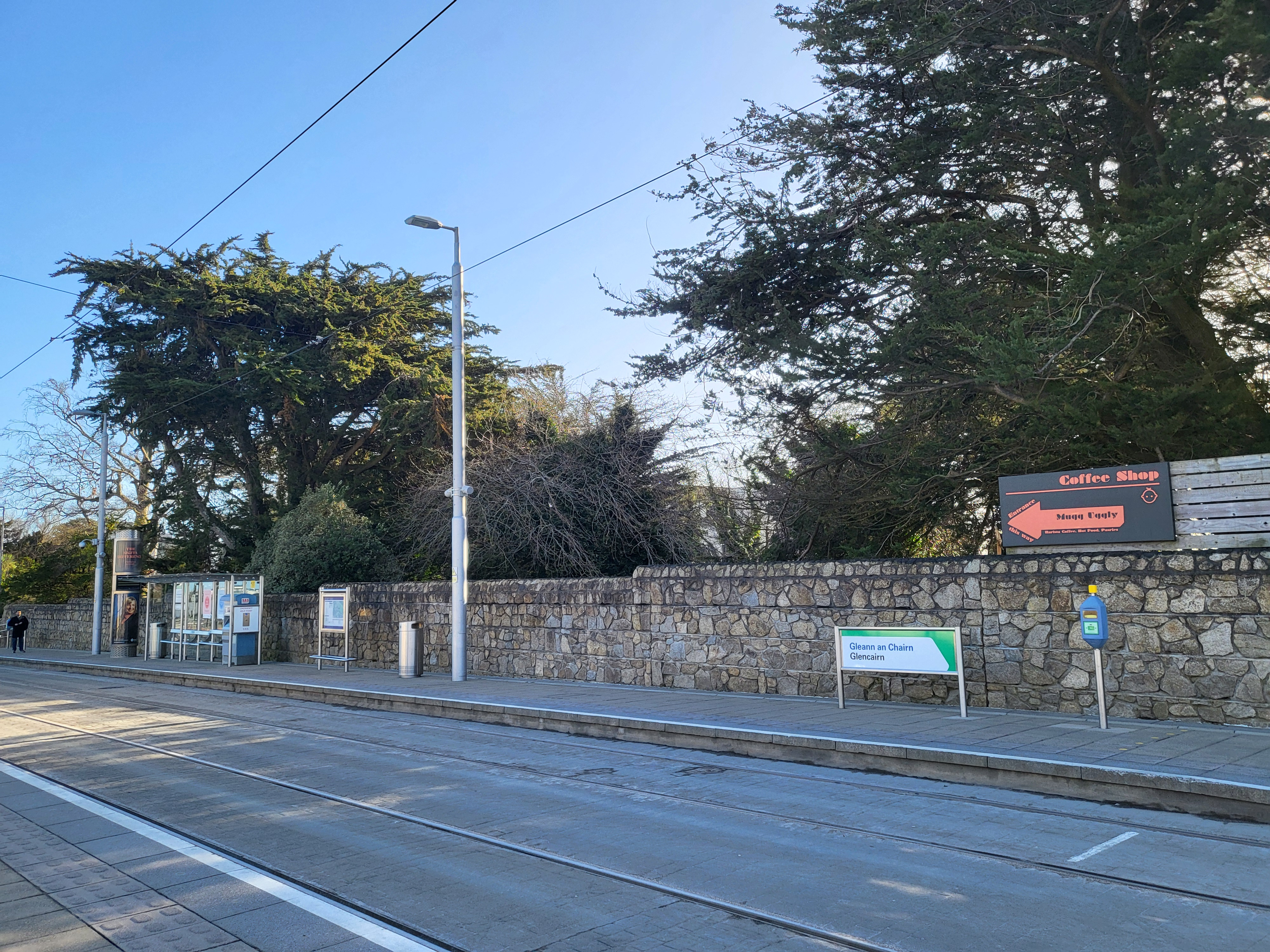
- Glencairn Stop

General information
- Location: County Dublin; Ireland
- Coordinates: 53°15′59″N 6°12′36″W
- Owner: Transport Infrastructure Ireland
- Operator: Luas
- Line: Green
- Platforms: 2
- Bus routes: 2
- Bus operators: Dublin Bus
- Connections: 47; 118

Construction
- Structure type: At-grade

Other information
- Fare zone: Green 4

Key dates
- 16 October 2010: Stop opened

Services
Preceding station	Luas	Following station
Central Park towards Parnell or Broombridge	Green Line	The Gallops towards Brides Glen
Location
- Location within Dublin

Glencairn (Irish: Gleann an Chairn) is a stop on the Luas light-rail tram system in Dún Laoghaire–Rathdown, County Dublin, Ireland. It opened in 2010 as a stop on the extension of the Green Line south from Sandyford to Brides Glen.

== Location and access ==
The stop is located at the side of Murphystown Way, near Glencairn House, the official residence of the British ambassador to Ireland.

To the south of the stop, the track continues in a reserved section at the side of the road. To the north, it cuts through an otherwise undeveloped wooded area, crosses the M50 motorway on a bridge, and continues north.

== Onward transport ==
The stop is served by Dublin Bus routes 47 and 118, providing connections to Stepaside and Belarmine, as well as further destinations such as Stillorgan and University College Dublin.
