= Stepaside, Dublin =

Suburban village in County Dublin, Ireland

Stepaside An Chéim
- Suburban village
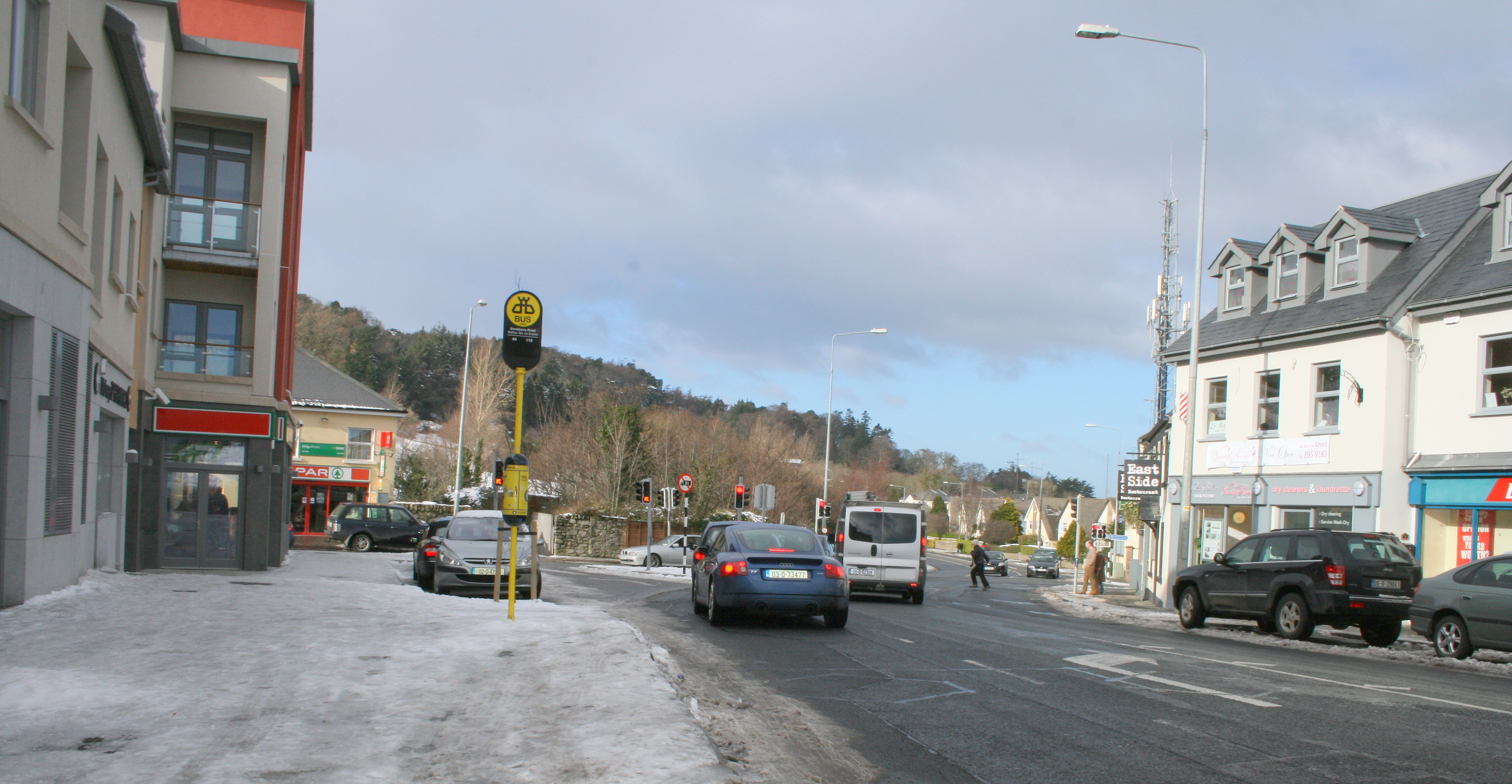
- Stepaside's main street

- Location in Dublin Stepaside (Ireland)
- Coordinates: 53°15.17′N 6°12.845′W
- Country: Ireland
- County: County Dublin
- Local authority: Dún Laoghaire–Rathdown County Council
- Time zone: UTC+0 (WET)
  - Summer (DST): UTC+1 (IST (WEST))
- Eircode routing key: D18
- Area code: 01 (+3531)
- Irish Grid Reference: O189241

Stepaside (Irish: An Chéim) is a village in the townland of Kilgobbin, located in south County Dublin, in Dún Laoghaire–Rathdown, Ireland. The area is 4 kilometres (2.5 mi) south of Dundrum.

== History ==
Stepaside developed in the 18th and early 19th centuries when the adjacent medieval settlement of Kilgobbin was bypassed by a new stretch of the Enniskerry Road, was built from what is now Lamb's Cross through to Kilternan. Stepaside became a new staging post along this route, while Kilgobbin Road with its coaching inn (now Oldtown House) was no longer used by goods traffic or stagecoaches.

Stepaside is home to Kilgobbin Church, built in the 17th century.

== History and development ==
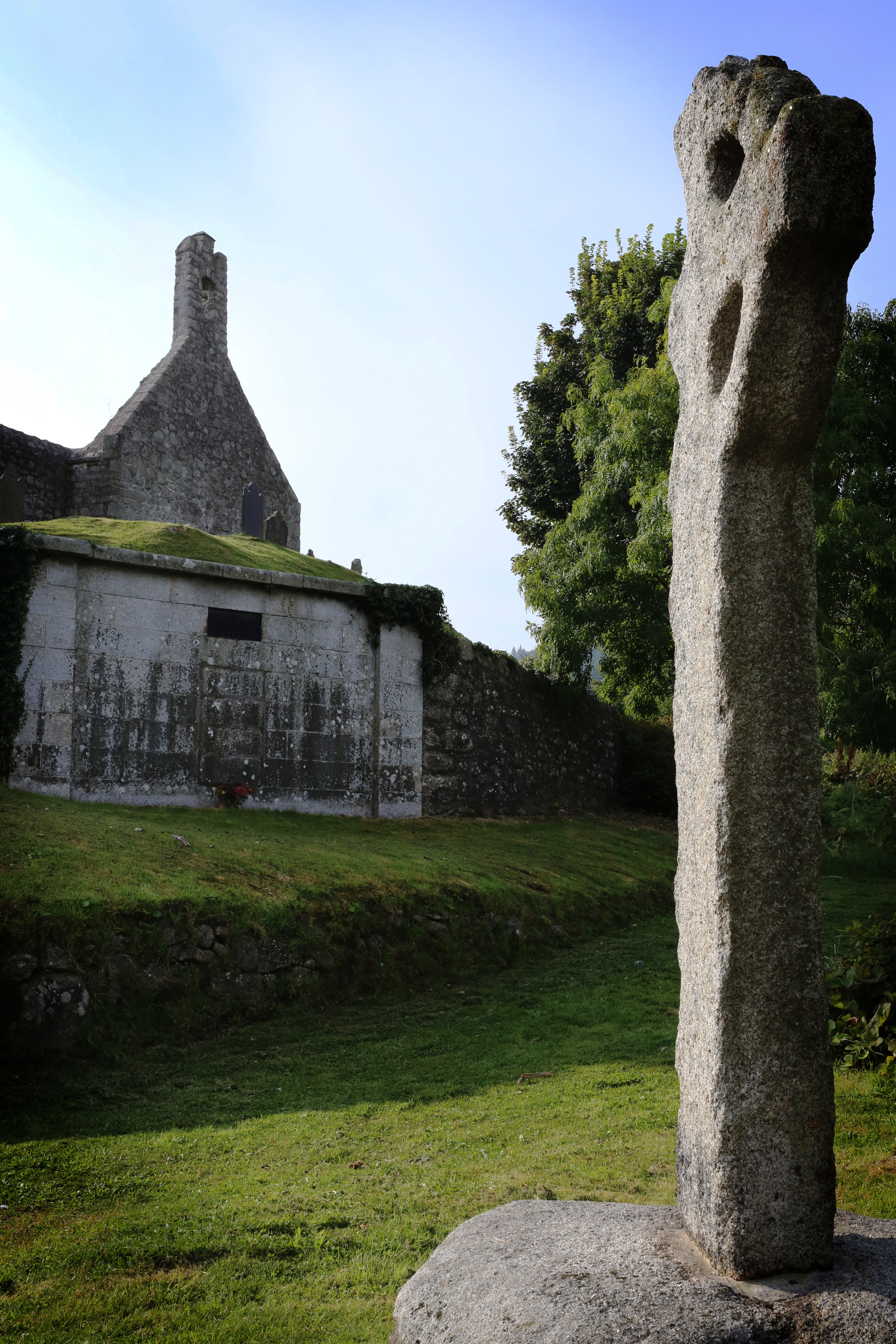
Kilgobbin Cross is a 10th century cross in Stepaside

Previously a separate rural village, as of the early 21st century, Stepaside has been absorbed by the Dublin conurbation to the north and east, and has seen accompanying residential development and population growth.

In 2007, Dún Laoghaire–Rathdown County Council announced plans to build a community park for the Carrickmines, Ballyogan, and Stepaside areas. A large civic centre in the area is named after Samuel Beckett.

== Population ==
As of the 2016 census, the population of the Glencullen electoral area, which includes the villages of Stepaside, Glencullen and Kiltiernan, was 19,773 in total.

== Location and access ==
Stepaside lies to the south-east of Dublin city on the R117 regional road. It is also near junction 14 of the M50 motorway. Located at the foot of Three Rock Mountain, neighbouring areas include Sandyford, Kilternan, Ballyogan, Leopardstown, Carrickmines, Belarmine and Glencullen.

Stepaside is served by Dublin Bus routes 44, 47 and 118. Go-Ahead Ireland route L26 also has stops in the area. The Luas Green Line has stops at Glencairn and The Gallops, each approximately 2 kilometres (1.2 mi) from the centre of Stepaside.

== Amenities ==
Dublin's newest public park is in Stepaside – the former estate of Fernhill House, which was opened to the public in 2019. It has heritage buildings, garden areas, parkland and woods, located close to Stepaside village (one entrance is opposite the Belarmine development). Ticknock Forest is also nearby.

Stepaside village itself has a post office and a Garda station. It also has a number of pubs and restaurants, a small supermarket, fishmongers, butchers, pharmacy and other small retail outlets.

There are several schools in Stepaside, including Educate Together primary and secondary schools. A gaelscoil (Irish-speaking school), Gaelscoil Thaobh na Coille, is located in Woodside.

== Sport ==
Local soccer (association football) clubs include Stepaside F.C., and Wayside Celtic F.C. at Kilternan. There is also an all-weather pitch at Jamestown in Stepaside. While there are no Gaelic Athletic Association clubs in the area, nearby clubs include Naomh Olaf (Sandyford), Kilmacud Crokes (Stillorgan), and Stars of Erin (Glencullen).

There are a number of golf courses, driving ranges and par 3 golf facilities in the area.

== People ==
Former or current residents of Stepaside village have included:

- Alan Byrne, retired soccer player of the 1980s and 1990s
- Mick Curley, chairman of the National Referees' Association, was stationed in the village in the 1970s as a Garda superintendent.
- Joe Elliott, the Sheffield-born lead singer of Def Leppard, lives in the area
- Neale Richmond, Fine Gael politician
- Hal Roach, comedian.

== See also ==
- List of towns and villages in Ireland
