= The Gallops Luas stop =

Tram stop in Dublin, Ireland

The Gallops An Eachrais
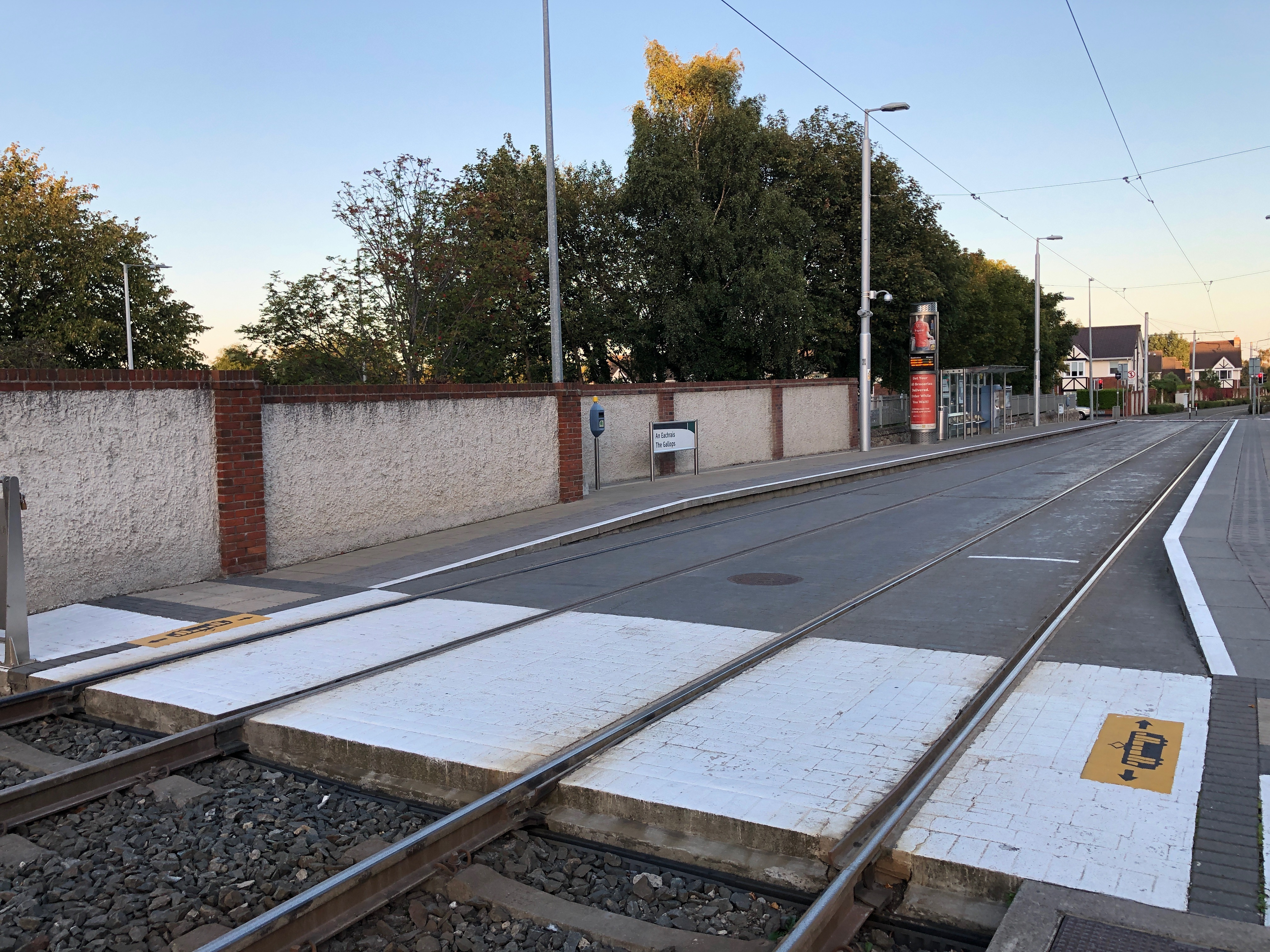
- The Gallops stop

General information
- Location: Dublin; Ireland
- Coordinates: 53°15′40″N 6°12′21″W
- Owner: Transport Infrastructure Ireland
- Operator: Luas
- Line: Green
- Platforms: 2

Construction
- Structure type: At-grade

Other information
- Fare zone: Green 4

Key dates
- 16 October 2010: Stop opened

Services
Preceding station	Luas	Following station
Glencairn towards Parnell or Broombridge	Green Line	Leopardstown Valley towards Brides Glen
Location
- Location within Dublin

The Gallops (Irish: An Eachrais) is a stop on the Luas light-rail tram system in Dún Laoghaire–Rathdown, County Dublin, Ireland. It opened in 2010 as a stop on the extension of the Green Line south from Sandyford to Brides Glen. The stop provides access to the nearby village of Stepaside. The stop is named for the nearby housing estate (built in the 1990s), which is named for its location near Leopardstown Racecourse.

== Location and access ==
The stop is located at the side of Ballyogan Road. To the south of the stop, the line continues in a section of reserved track next to the road. To the north, the track curves along Murphystown Way.
