= Leopardstown Park Hospital =

Hospital in Foxrock, Dublin, Ireland

- Health Service Executive
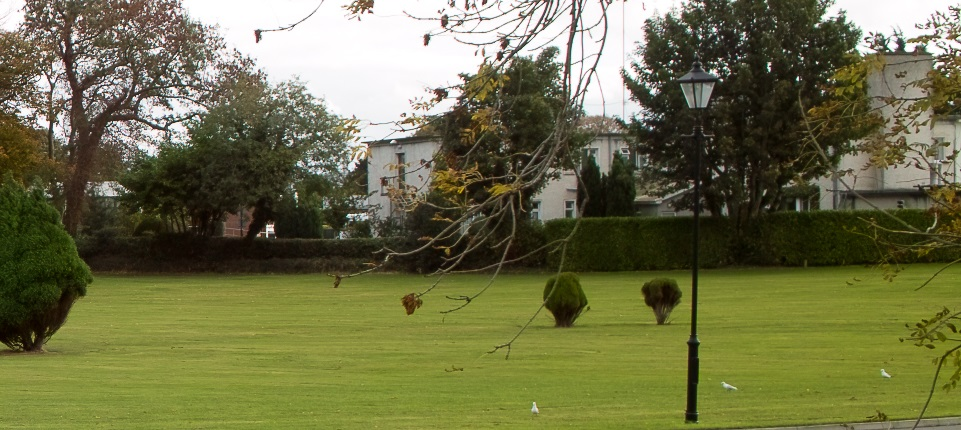
- Leopardstown Park Hospital

- Shown in Dublin

Geography
- Location: Foxrock, Dublin, Ireland
- Coordinates: 53.2687°N 6.2044°W

Organisation
- Care system: Public / Voluntary
- Type: General

Services
- Beds: 197

History
- Founded: 1917

Links
- Website: www.lph.ie
- Lists: Hospitals in the Republic of Ireland

Leopardstown Hospital (Irish: Ospidéal Pháirc Bhaile na Lobhar) is a publicly funded voluntary hospital in Foxrock, Dublin, Ireland offering healthcare to elderly patients and war veterans.

== History ==
The house and grounds were donated in trust in 1917 to found a hospital for wounded and invalided members of the British Armed Forces. Ireland was part of the United Kingdom of Great Britain and Ireland and involved in the First World War. The hospital was established by the British Ministry of Pensions, which funded it and nominated the trustees even after the independence of the Irish Free State in 1922, as did its successor, the Department of Health and Social Security (DHSS). Between 1922 and 1931, Leopardstown Park Hospital was the only in-patient facility in the Irish Free State for the treatment of shell-shocked veterans of the First World War.

In 1974, when the number of British veterans in Dublin had fallen low, a private act was passed by the Oireachtas, with the agreement of the DHSS, to amend the trust deed to allow non-service patients to be admitted. In 1979, management was transferred to a board of nine members, seven now appointed by the Irish Minister of Health and two by the UK Secretary of State for Defence. British war veterans retain priority right of admission.

In April 2008, Enda Kenny, leader of opposition party Fine Gael, used the hospital as an example of then-Taoiseach Bertie Ahern's failure to provide adequate healthcare.

In June 2017 the hospital marked its centenary with a concert on the hospital grounds, attended by the Minister for Arts, Heritage, Regional, Rural and Gaeltacht Affairs, Heather Humphreys, and Robert Barnett, the British ambassador to Ireland.

== Facilities ==
The hospital is run by the Leopardstown Park Hospital Board on behalf of the Health Service Executive and offers residential day care, a day centre, respite care and convalescent care for the elderly. The hospital has 197 beds.
