= List of national monuments in County Dublin =

The Irish state has officially approved the following list of national monuments in County Dublin and the city of Dublin. In the Republic of Ireland, a structure or site may be deemed to be a "national monument", and therefore worthy of state protection unless the government decides to demolish it. If the land adjoining the monument is essential to protect it, this land may also be protected.

== National Monuments ==
NM#	Monument name	Description	Image	Townland	Location
310	Baldongan Church	Church & Tower		Baldongan	53°33′11″N 6°07′44″W
437	Ballyedmonduff Wedge Tomb	Wedge Tomb		Ballyedmonduff	53°13′45″N 6°13′34″W
590	Balrothery Tower	Church Tower		Balrothery	53°35′12″N 6°11′24″W
291	Brennanstown Portal Tomb	Portal Tomb		Brennanstown	53°15′14″N 6°09′32″W
32	Clondalkin Round Tower	Round Tower & Cross		Clondalkin	53°19′19″N 6°23′43″W
285	Tully's Castle	Castle		Clondalkin	53°19′15″N 6°23′24″W
444	Archbold's Castle	Castle		Dalkey	53°16′40″N 6°06′23″W
33	Dalkey Island Church	Church		Dalkey Island	53°16′22″N 6°05′08″W
401	St. Mary's Abbey	Abbey (Cistercian) (Chapter house)		Northside Dublin	53°20′51″N 6°16′09″W
34	St. Audoen's Church	Church		Southside Dublin	53°20′37″N 6°16′27″W
	St. Stephen's Green	Park		Southside Dublin	53°20′17″N 6°15′33″W
230	Dunsoghly Castle	Castle		Dunsoghly	53°25′37″N 6°19′06″W
276	Glencullen Standing Stone	Standing Stone		Glencullen	53°13′11″N 6°13′03″W
605	Grange Abbey	Church		Donaghmede	53°23′57″N 6°09′38″W
36	Howth Church	Church		Howth	53°23′15″N 6°03′57″W
226	Kilgobbin Cross	Cross		Kilgobbin	53°15′23″N 6°13′04″W
207, 587	Kill of the Grange	Church, Well & Bullaun Stone		Kill of the Grange	53°16′53″N 6°09′40″W
35	Cill Iníon Léinín	Church		Killiney	53°15′17″N 6°06′59″W
675	Kilmainham Gaol	Prison		Kilmainham	53°20′31″N 6°18′35″W
493	Kilmashogue	Wedge Tomb		Rathfarnham	53°15′28″N 6°16′32″W
343	Kiltiernan Tomb	Portal Tomb		Kiltiernan	53°14′20″N 6°12′26″W
216	Laughanstown	Crosses and wedge tomb		Laughanstown	53°14′32″N 6°09′06″W
225	Tully Church	Church		Laughanstown	53°14′49″N 6°09′08″W
157	Lusk	Round Tower & Church Tower		Lusk	53°31′34″N 6°10′02″W
302	Casino at Marino	Demesne Building		Marino	53°22′16″N 6°13′37″W
494	Monkstown Castle	Castle		Monkstown	53°17′20″N 6°09′02″W
628	Rathfarnham Castle	Castle or Fortified House		Rathfarnham	53°17′53″N 6°17′01″W
162	Rathmichael	Early Medieval Ecclesiastical Site		Rathmichael	53°13′58″N 6°08′46″W
340	Swords Castle	Castle		Swords	53°27′35″N 6°13′12″W
464	Tibradden	Cairn		Rathfarnham	53°14′19″N 6°16′49″W

== Sources ==
- National Monuments in Dublin, County and City
