= Cherrywood, Dublin =

Suburban development of Dublin, Ireland

Cherrywood Coill na Silíní (Irish)
- Suburban development
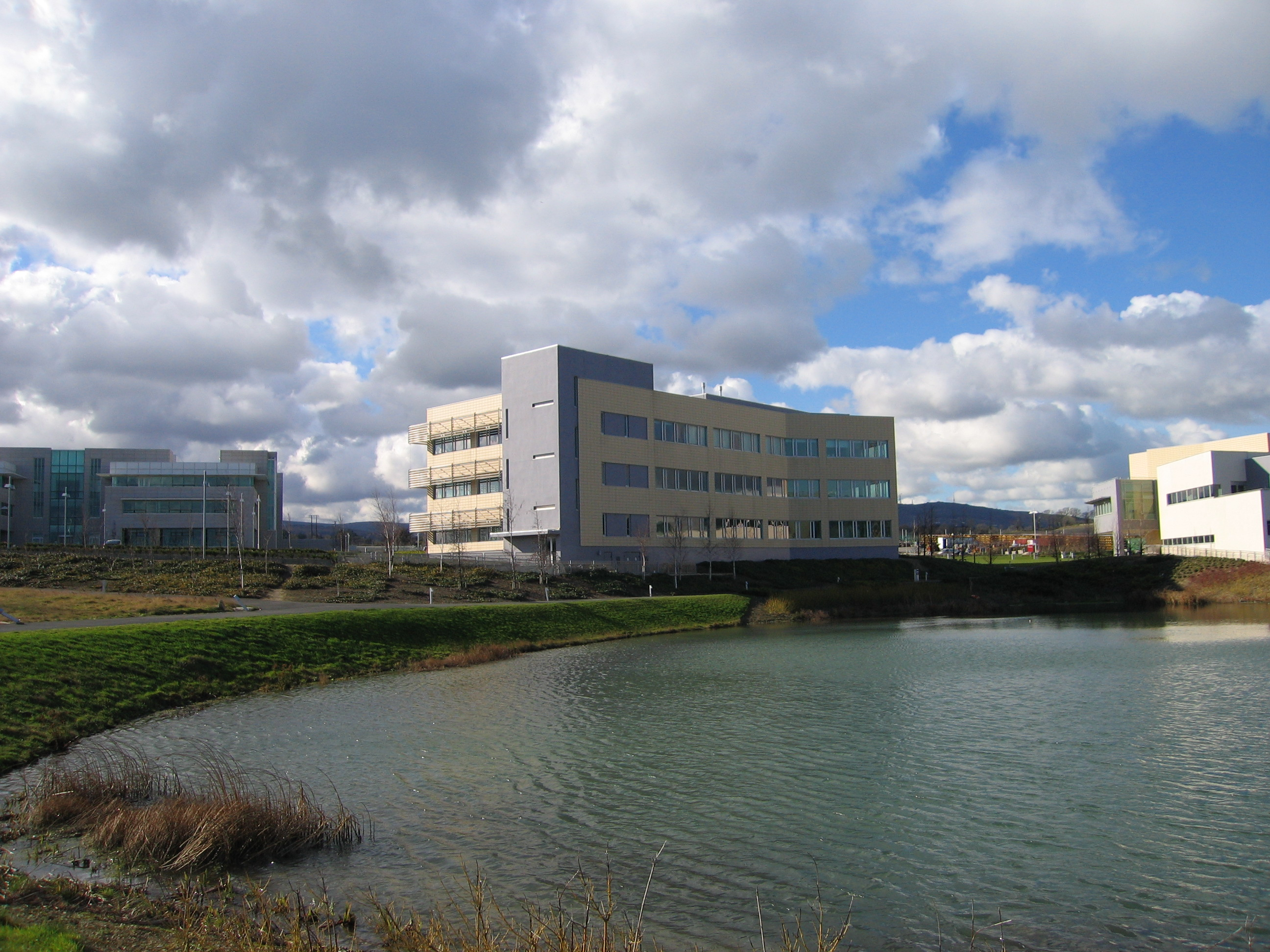
- Cherrywood Business Park

- Location in Ireland
- Coordinates: 53°14′40.6″N 6°8′29.3″W
- Country: Ireland
- Province: Leinster
- Traditional county: County Dublin
- Local authority: Dún Laoghaire–Rathdown County Council
- Established: 1988

Government
  - Dáil Éireann: Dún Laoghaire
- Elevation: 31 m (102 ft)
- Eircode routing key: D18
- Area code: 01 (+3531)
- Irish Grid Reference: O244235

Cherrywood (Irish: Coill na Silíní) is a suburban development of Dublin, Ireland, bordering Cabinteely, Loughlinstown and Rathmichael. It is located to the southeast of the city, in Dún Laoghaire–Rathdown. The development commenced on a greenfield site in 1998 and primarily comprises Cherrywood Business Park and new residential and retail development.

== Location ==
The modern development of Cherrywood is located on the old townlands of Cherrywood, Laughanstown and Glebe as well as parts of Brenanstown. It borders the modern day suburbs of Cabinteely, Loughlinstown, Rathmichael and Carrickmines.

It lies between the M50 motorway and the N11 road, about a kilometre north of where they fork from the M11. Cherrywood is divided by the R118 regional road which runs northeast to southwest through the area, crossing the N11 at Wyattville Road and joining the M50 at Junction 16.

To the south of this road lies the business park (originally 'Cherrywood Science and Technology Park' and later 'The Campus Cherrywood') as well as a number of mid-rise apartment buildings. The north side of the road is largely parkland and residential with a mixture of apartments and houses.

== History ==
=== Pre-development ===
Evidence of human activity in the area dates to (at least) the Neolithic period, with the Brennanstown Portal Tomb dated to c. 2500 BC. Another wedge tomb in Laughanstown dates from either the late Neolithic or early Bronze Age.

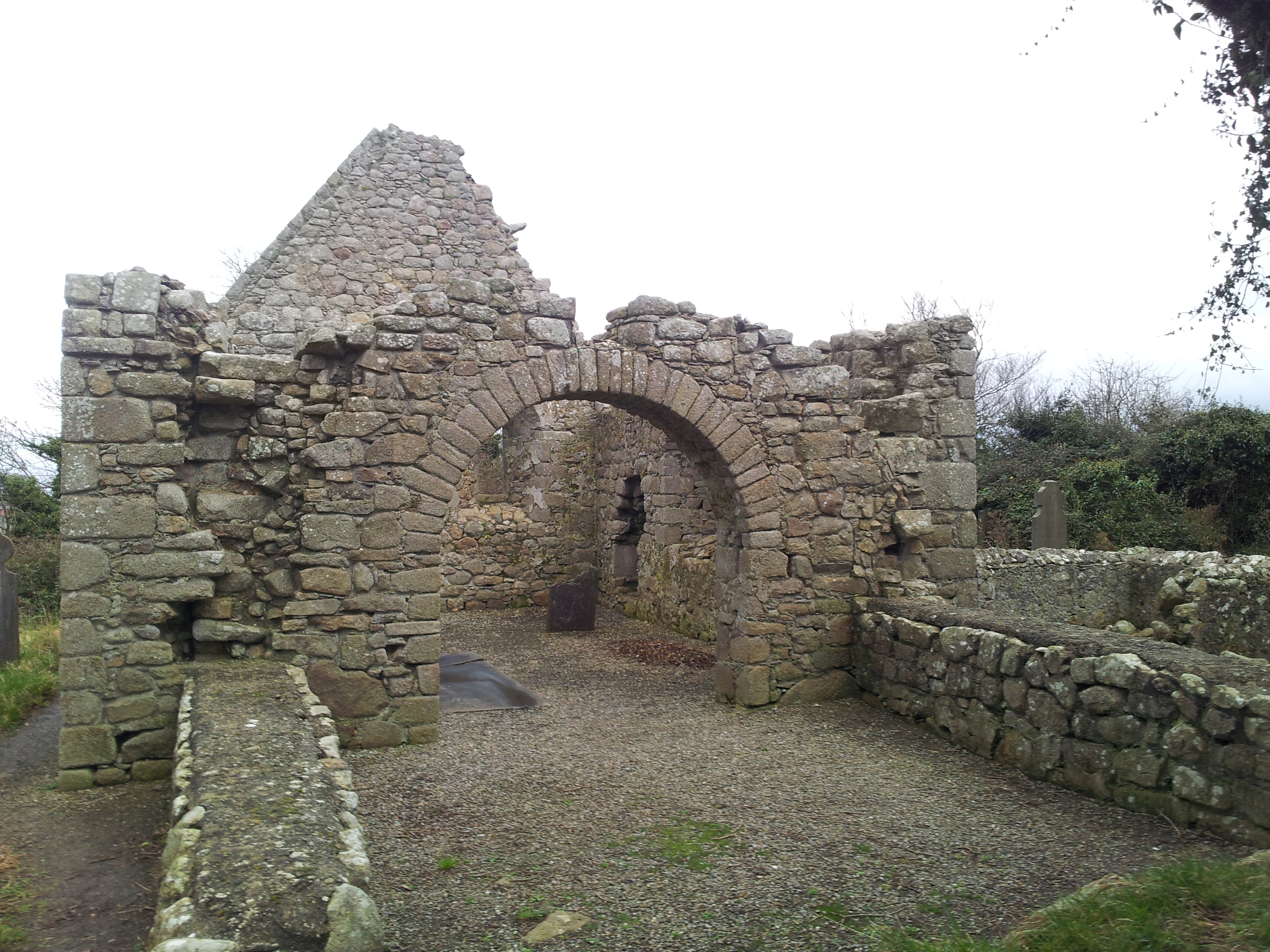
Tully Church

The ruined Tully Church at Laughanstown was established between the 6th and 9th centuries and remained in use until the 17th century.

Under fear of invasion by Napoleonic forces, a large army camp was established at Laughanstown in 1794 that is believed to have housed as many as 4,000 soldiers. Several roads were built connecting the camp to the coast at Killiney including the Military Road that runs through the crossroads ar Ballybrack before it was decommissioned in the 1810s.

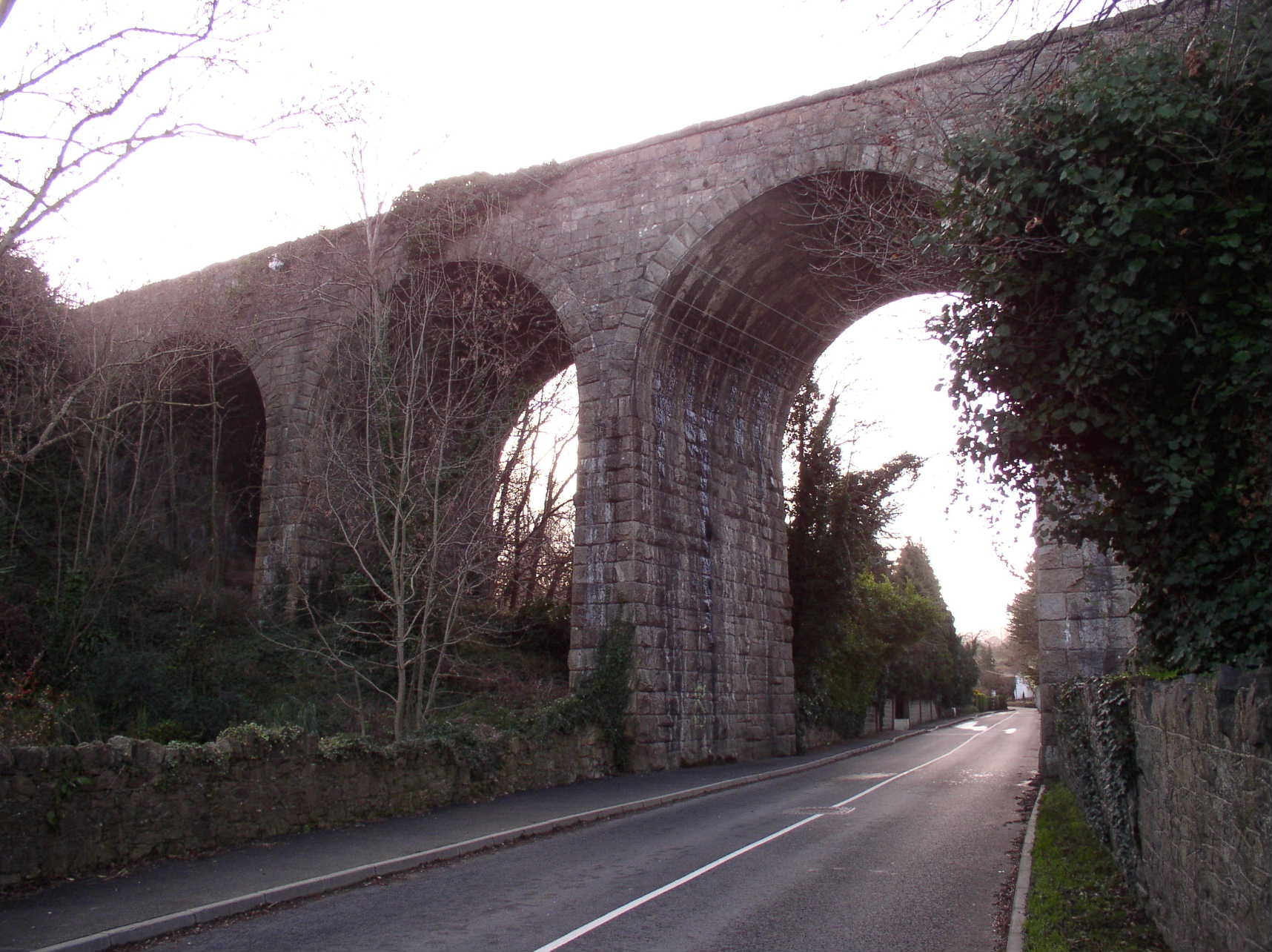
Brides Glen Viaduct

The Harcourt Street railway line was built through the area in the 1850s. Trains passed over a large 5-arched viaduct at Bride's Glen, located directly to the south of the modern business park. The Harcourt Street Line was closed in 1958, and the viaduct remains disused.

=== Business park development ===
Cherrywood is being formed around the business park, in a deliberate process under a Cherrywood-Carrickmines Local Area Plan, the 2004 and later County Development Plans, and a related Cherrywood-Rathmichael Area Plan. Cherrywood is designated as a District Centre, and limits apply to certain forms of development there. In total the business park has an area of approximately 400 acres with, as of 2024, much of it still under development or undeveloped.

The site where Cherrywood is located was rezoned for development by Dublin County Council in late 1993, at that time owned by Monarch Properties. In 1998 the first office buildings were developed in what was then branded "Cherrywood Business Park". Development proceeded slowly and, as with other planned developments in Ireland, the property crash in 2008 affected Cherrywood. In 2015, when several buildings were still empty while other planned developments were incomplete, some reports described parts of the development as a "ghost town".

==== New management ====
In 2012, investors created a new management company to market the area again after the collapse of Liam Carroll's development company. This was backed by AIB Bank and Danske Bank (parent company of National Irish Bank). Parts of the area received a facelift, and the "facilities building", which had previously only housed a food outlet, was expanded to include a gym. Most of the main office buildings are owned by the same company.

A new master plan was made and approved by the local authority, including plans for over 1,200 apartments and over 500,000 square feet of commercial space, including a hotel.

==== Rebranding and further development ====
Following a €145m acquisition by Spear Street Capital of the eight office blocks comprising the development in January 2018, the business park was rebranded as "The Campus Cherrywood". Proceeds from the deal were later used to develop the surrounding area.

Plans to open a new life-sciences incubation and acceleration facility in the area were announced in October 2021. The new facility was planned to provide 18 labs and 9 offices over 30,000 square feet of space, and create 100 jobs in the sector.

== Major tenants ==
The main tenant in the development is Dell, which has its "Dublin Campus" at Cherrywood. Other notable tenants include Aviva, Elavon, and Ireland-based multinational IT and consulting company, Accenture. Mater Private opened a day hospital in Cherrywood in 2020.

== Transport ==
=== Luas ===
The Luas Green Line was extended from Sandyford to Cherrywood. Construction started in February 2007 and the line became operational on 16 October 2010. There are three operational Luas stops in Cherrywood: Cherrywood, Laughanstown and the terminus at Brides Glen. A fourth stop was built at the northern edge of Cherrywood in Brenanstown but as of August 2024, has not yet been put into service. The Cherrywood stop is located where the line splits off from the original Harcourt Street railway line's alignment. The railway crossed through Cherrywood via the Brides Glen Viaduct.

=== Bus ===
Routes 111, X2 and 7 all run through Cherrywood and terminate at Brides Glen Luas stop. Cherrywood is also served on the nearby N11 by the E1 which runs 24 hours as well as the southbound 133 towards Wicklow. The L14 route, which runs from Southern Cross Road in Bray, now also terminates in Cherrywood.

== Amenities ==
As of August 2024, facilities included an all-weather multi-purpose playing pitch, a sports pavilion, tennis courts, cycle paths and greenways. More than 3,000 trees were planted in the creation of three parks. These three parks were named Beckett Park, Ticknick Park and Tully Park and were all officially opened together in May 2023.

Cherrywood Educate Together National School, Cherrywood's first primary school, was completed in 2024, after opening in 2 phases. It has 24 classrooms.

== Sources ==
- Dún Laoghaire, Dublin: Dún Laoghaire-Rathdown County Development Plan, 2004; Dún Laoghaire-Rathdown County Council; Sections 1 and 3
