= Cherrywood Luas stop =

Tram stop in Dublin, Ireland

Cherrywood Coill na Sílíní
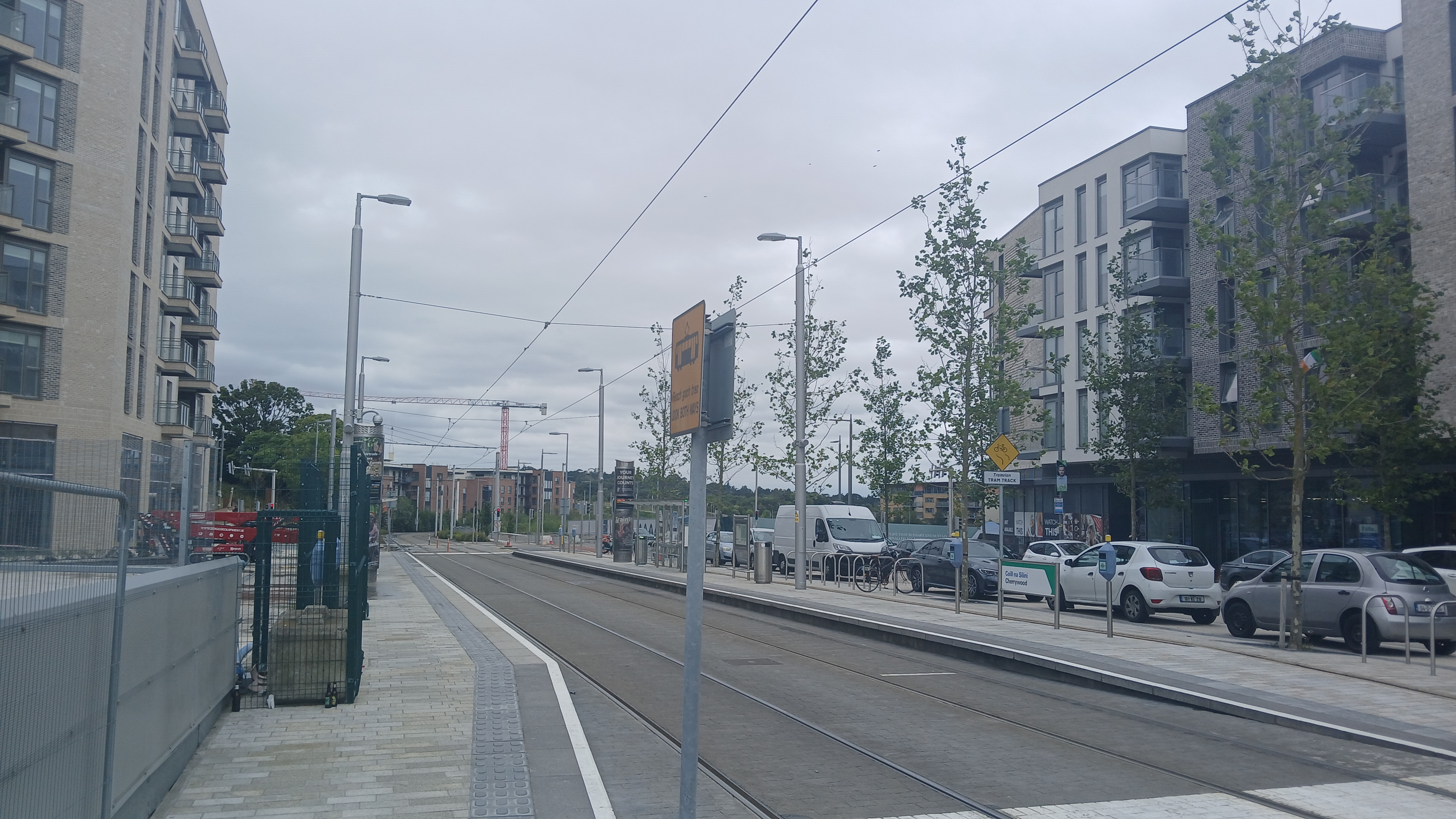
- View of the stop looking Northbound

General information
- Location: Grand Parade; Cherrywood, County Dublin; Ireland
- Coordinates: 53°14′43″N 6°08′45″W
- Owner: Transport Infrastructure Ireland
- Operator: Transdev (as Luas)
- Line: Green
- Platforms: 2
- Bus operators: Dublin Bus
- Connections: L14

Construction
- Structure type: At-grade

Other information
- Fare zone: Green 5

Key dates
- 16 October 2010: Stop opened
Location
- Location within Dublin

Cherrywood (Irish: Coill na Silíní) is a stop on the Luas light-rail tram system serving Cherrywood in Dún Laoghaire–Rathdown, County Dublin, Ireland. It opened in 2010 as a stop on the extension of the Green Line south from Sandyford to Brides Glen.

== Location and access ==
The stop provides access to the Cherrywood development and its eponymous business park. Cherrywood stop was built at the Northern end of a concrete viaduct over what would remain an empty plot of land for nearly a decade. However in late 2010s, the area around the stop began to be developed and it is now surrounded by apartment blocks and shops. The stop is accessed through Bishop Street and located on Grand Parade, a street still under construction as of October 2023.

== Services ==
Trams stop at the stop coming from either end every 10-18 minutes.

Preceding station	Luas	Following station
Laughanstown towards Parnell or Broombridge	Green Line	Brides Glen; Terminus
