= Glencullen Standing Stone =

- Liagáin Ghleann Cuilinn (Irish)
- Queen Mab
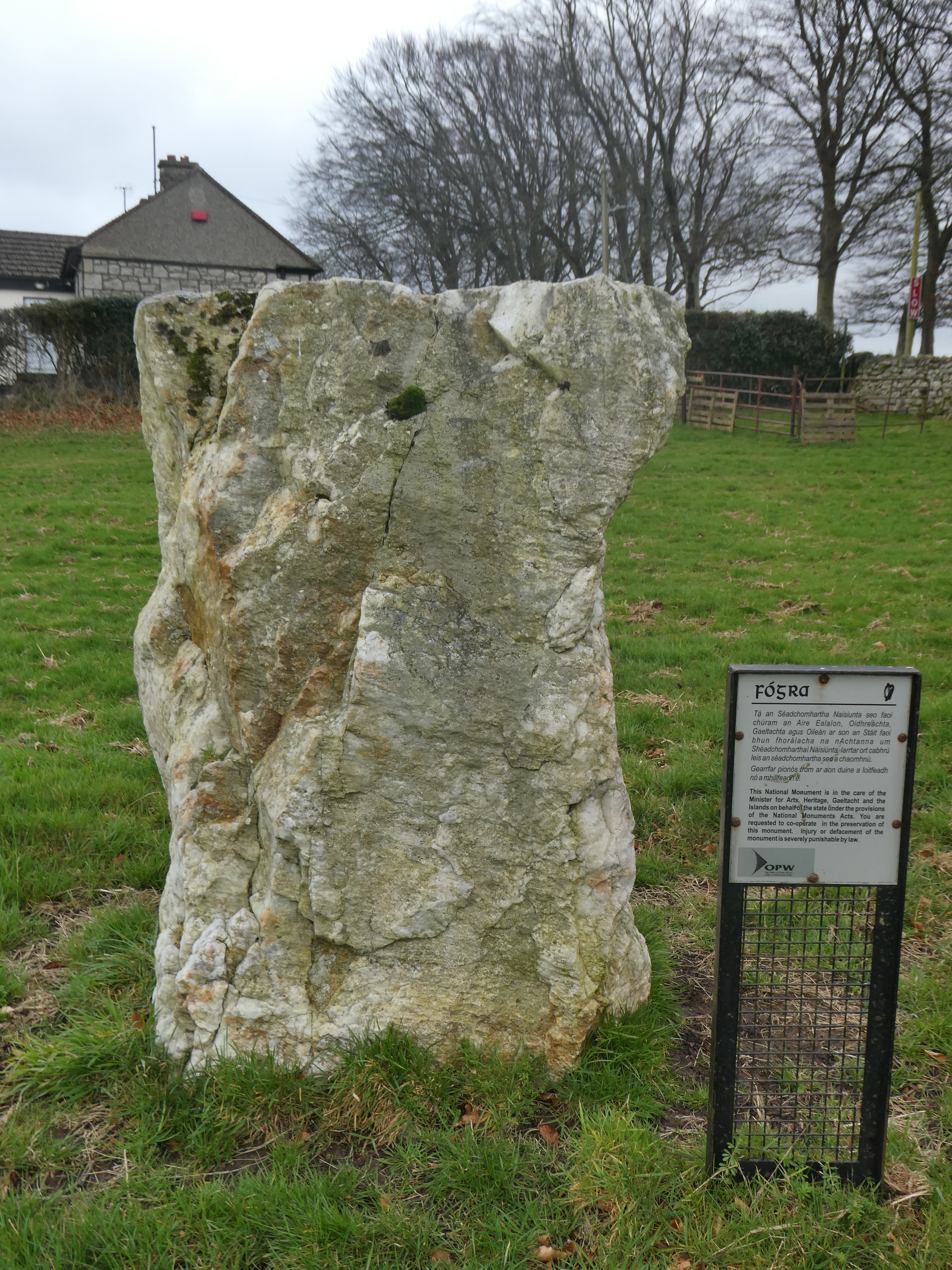
- Northwest face

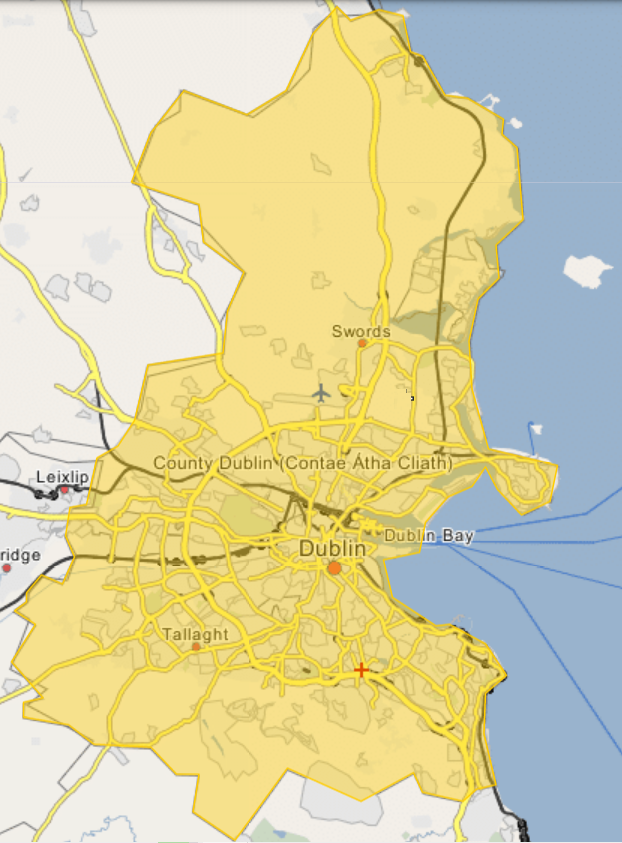
- Location within County Dublin
- 53°13′11″N 6°13′03″W
- Type: Standing stone
- Location: Barrack Road, Glencullen, Dún Laoghaire–Rathdown, Ireland

History
- Built: c. 18th century BC

Site notes
- Height: 1.83 m (6.0 ft)

National monument of Ireland
- Official name: Glencullen
- Reference no.: 276

Glencullen Standing Stone is a standing stone and National Monument located in Glencullen, County Dublin, Ireland.

== Location ==
Glencullen Standing Stone is located on Barrack Road, Glencullen.

== History ==
The stone (made of quartz) is supposed to have been erected c. 1700 BC. Legend has it that Viking invaders used the stones in a game of "rings." It is also known as "Queen Mab."

=== Gallery ===
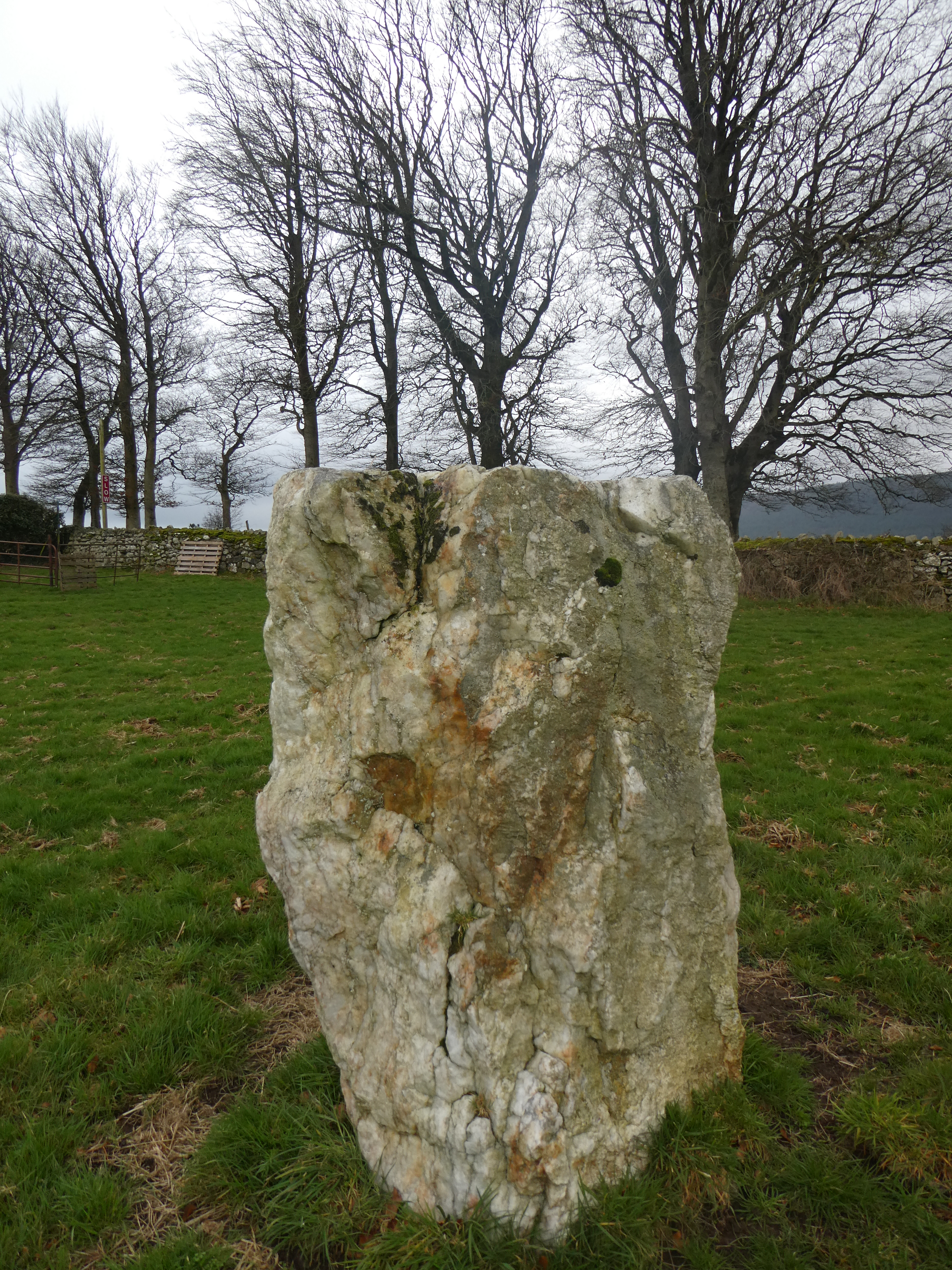
Facing west

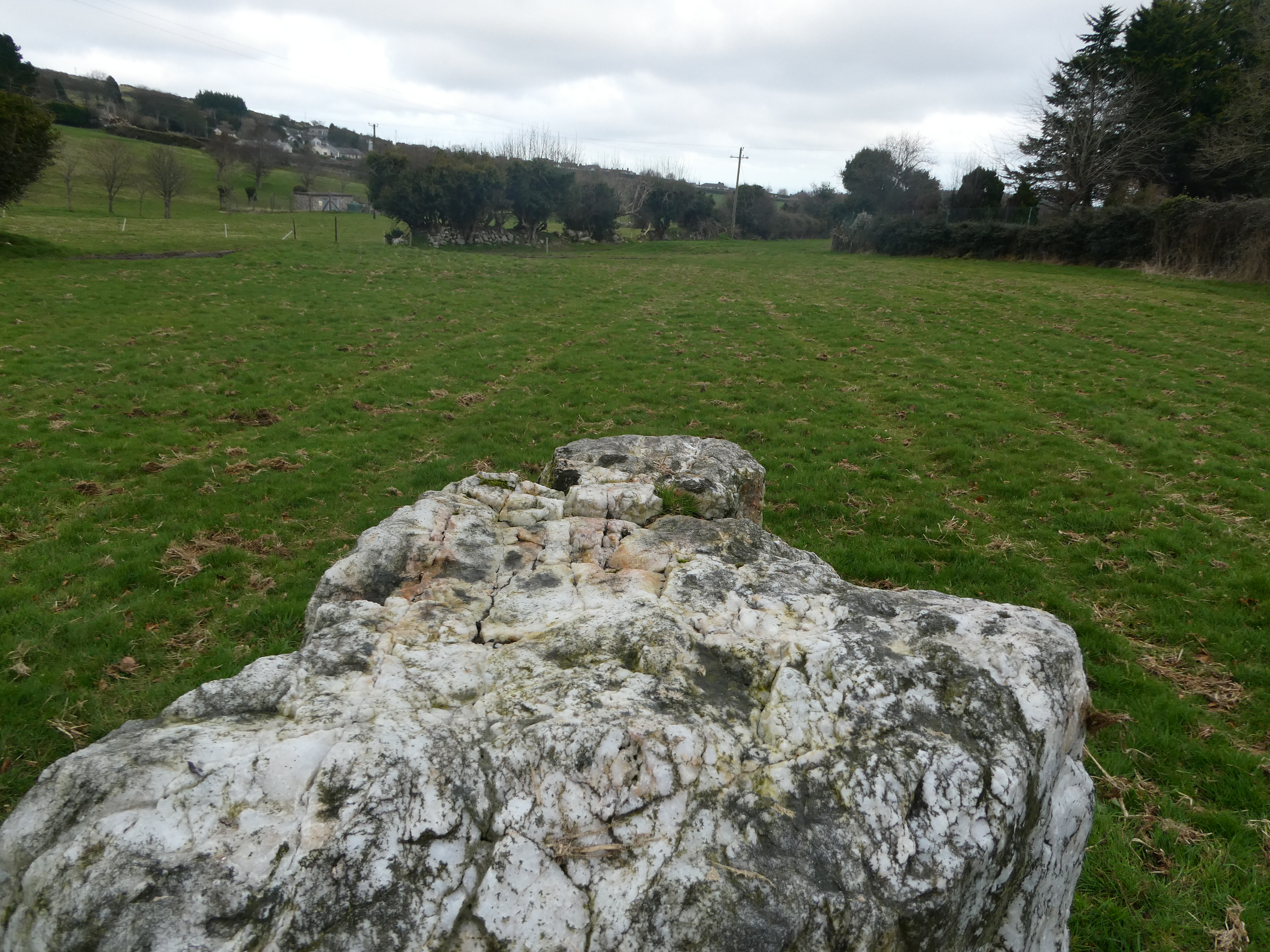
Facing east

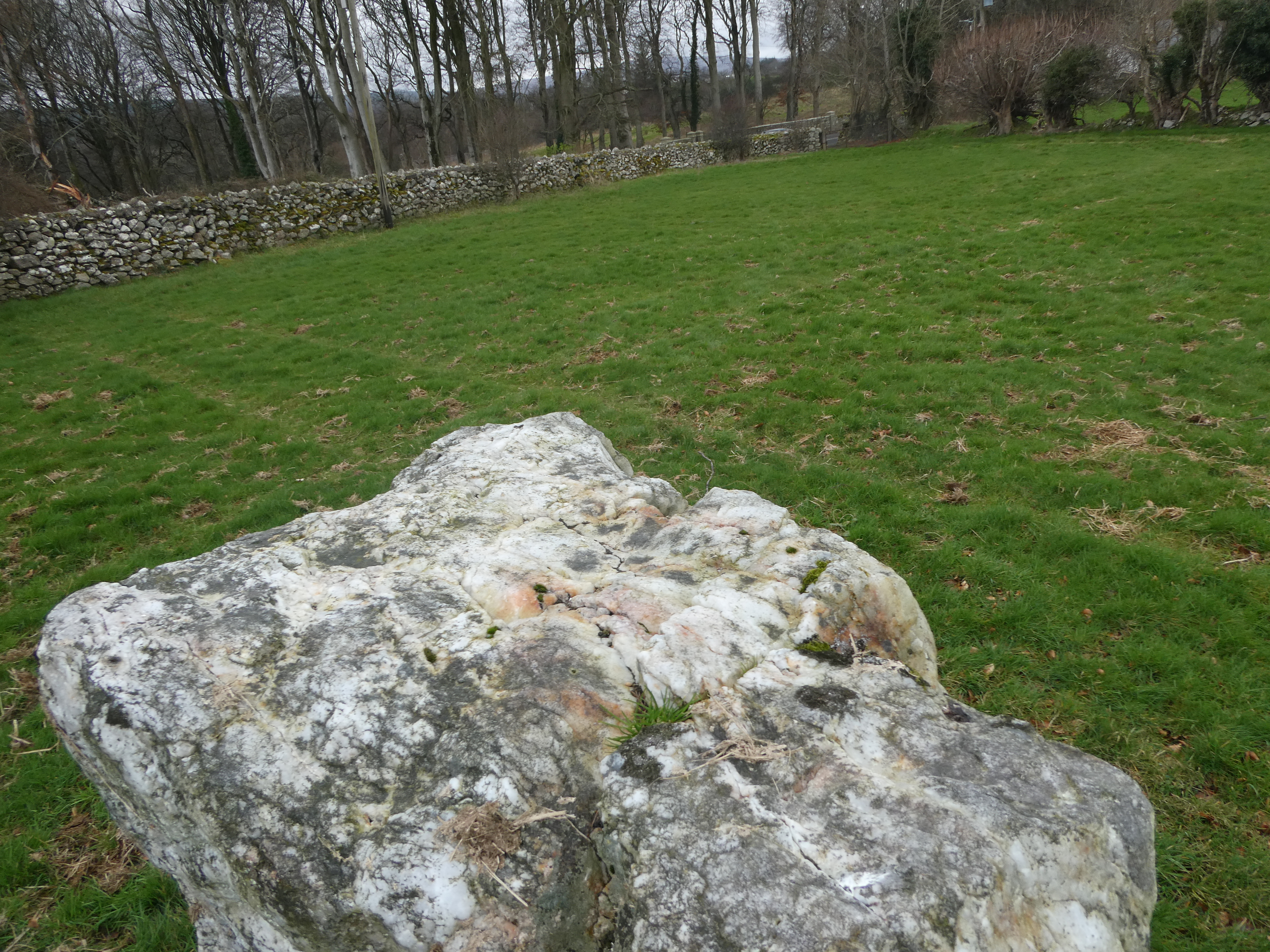
Facing west

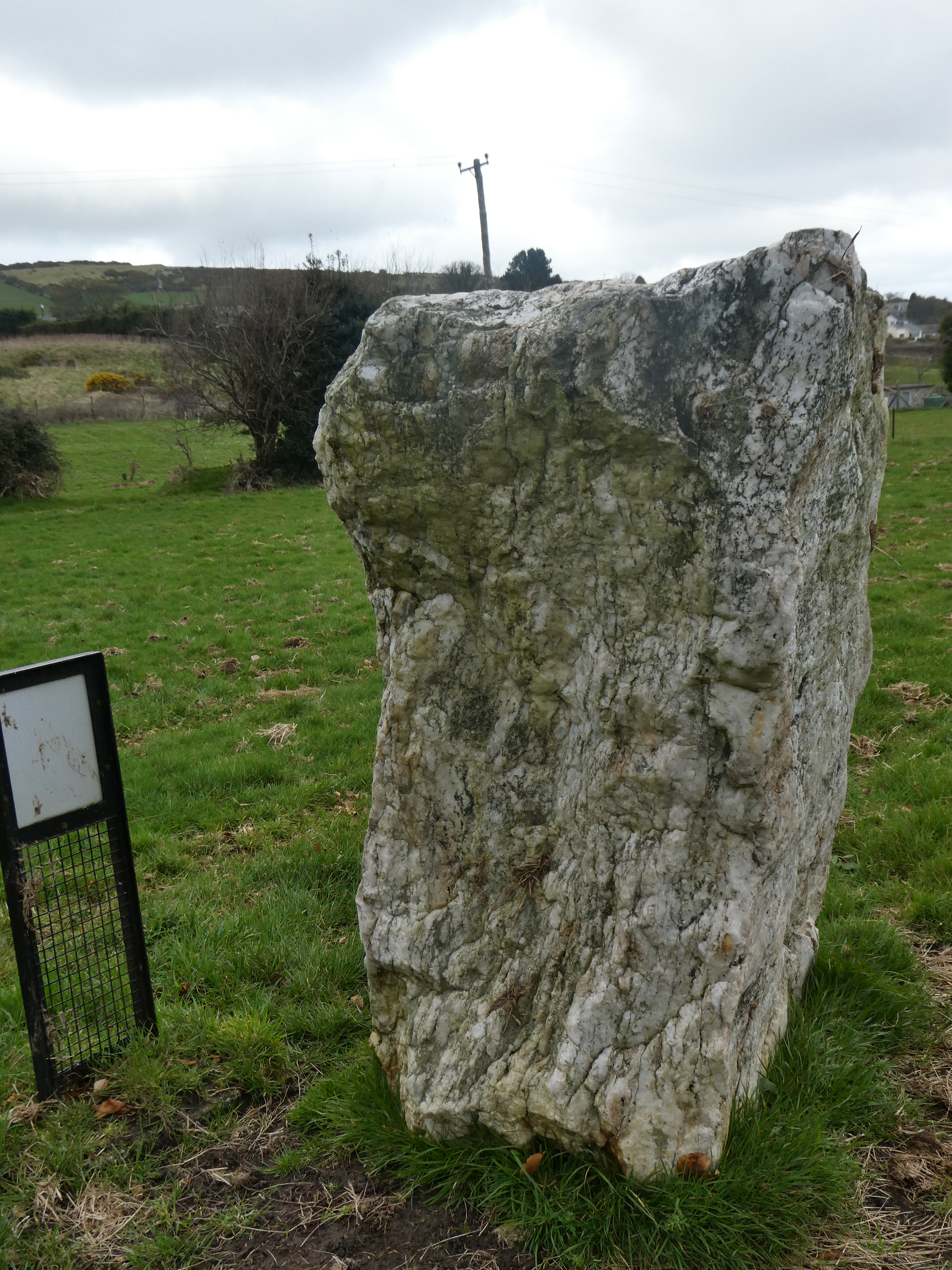
Southwest face

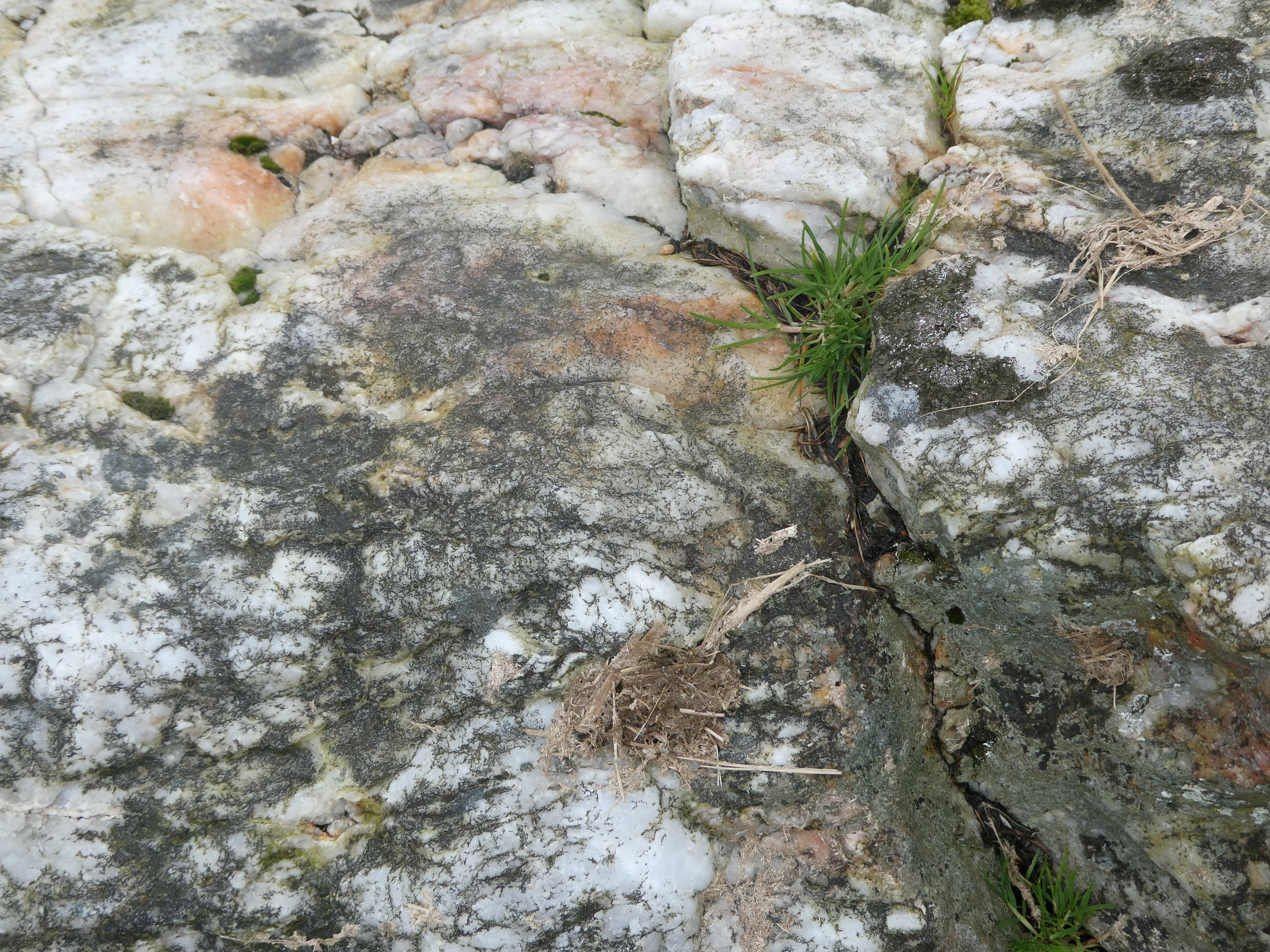
Detail

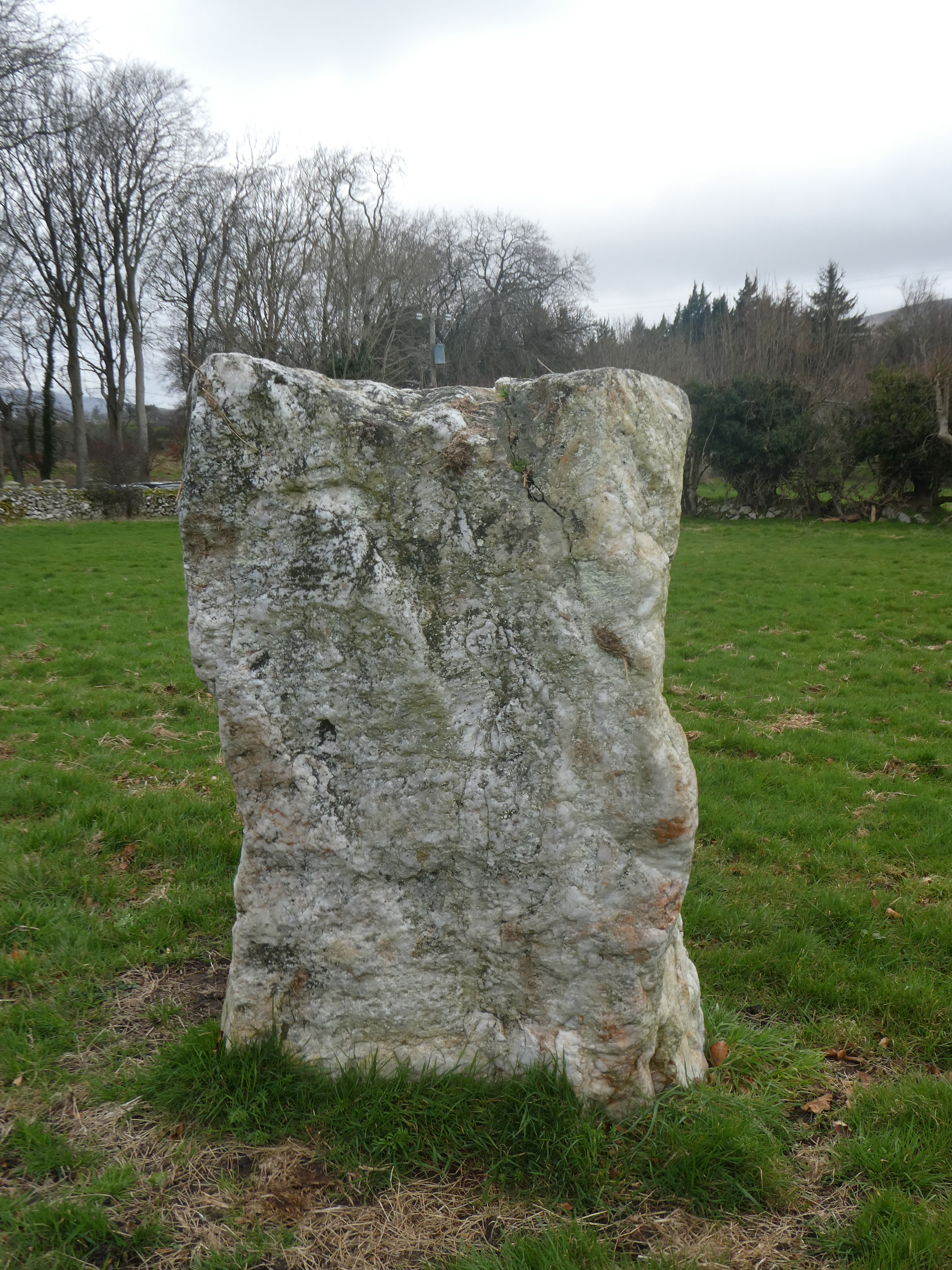
Southeast face

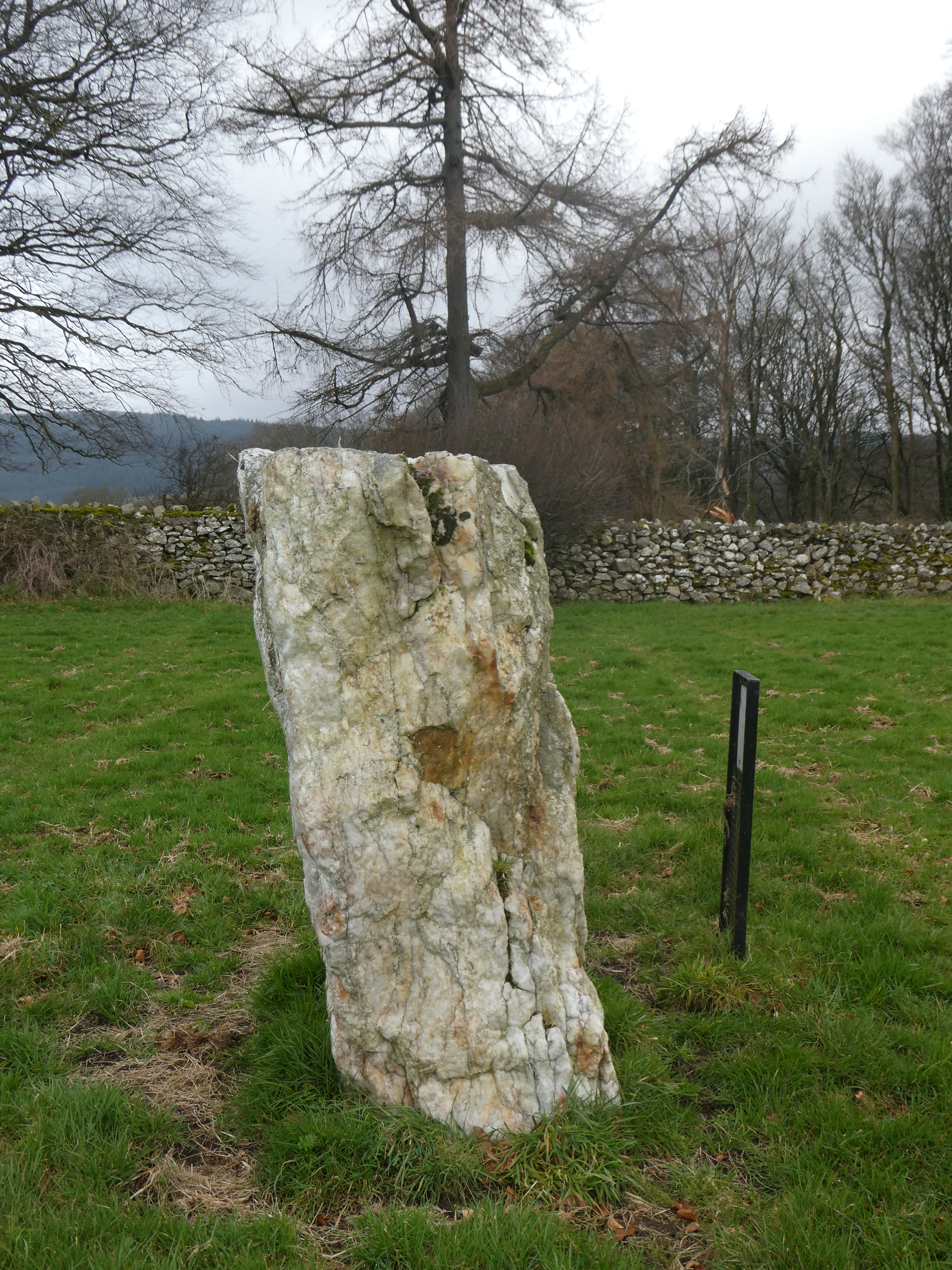
Northeast face

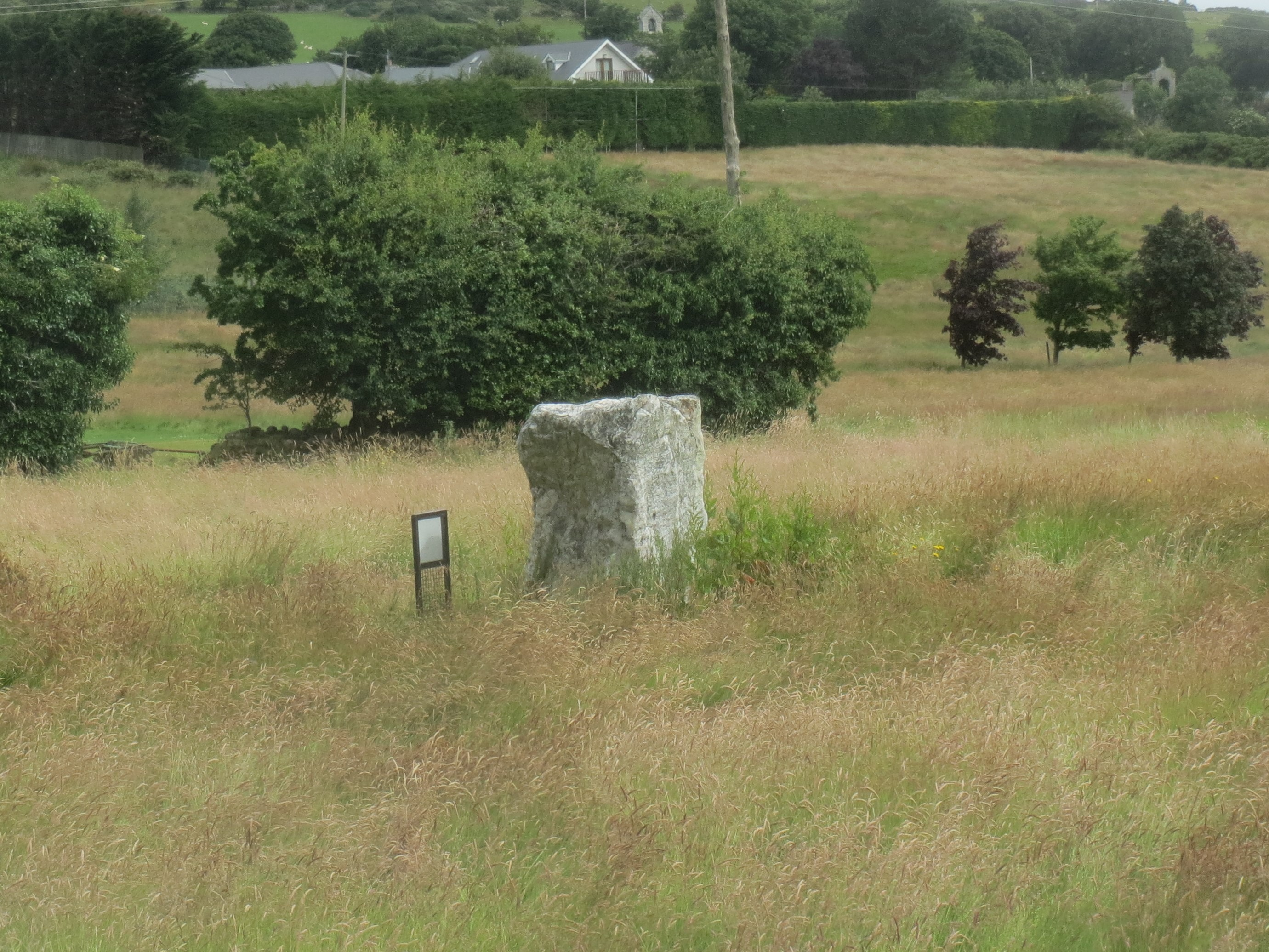
Glencullen Standing Stone
