= Laughanstown Luas stop =

Tram stop in Dublin, Ireland

Laughanstown Baile an Locháin
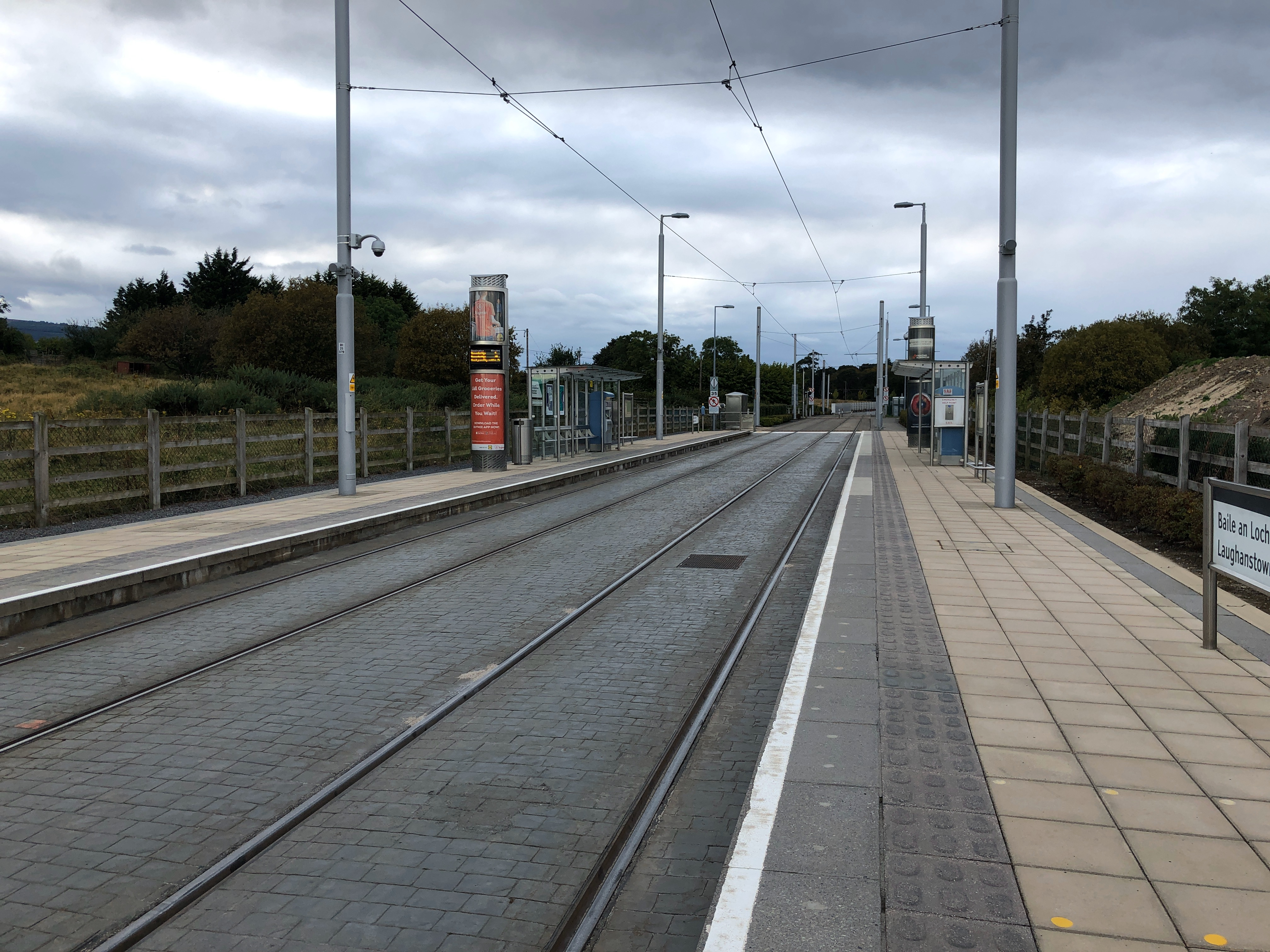
- The platforms at Laughanstown

General information
- Location: Lehaunstown Road / Grand Parade; Laughanstown, County Dublin; Ireland
- Coordinates: 53°15′02″N 6°09′18″W
- Owner: Transport Infrastructure Ireland
- Operator: Transdev (as Luas)
- Line: Green
- Platforms: 2

Construction
- Structure type: At-grade

Other information
- Fare zone: Green 5

Key dates
- 16 October 2010: Stop opened
Location
- Location within Dublin

Laughanstown (Irish: Baile an Locháin) is a stop on the green line of the Luas light-rail tram system in Dún Laoghaire–Rathdown, County Dublin, Ireland. The stop provides access to the nearby suburb of Cabinteely.

== History ==
The stop opened in 2010 as a stop on the extension of the Green Line south from Sandyford to Brides Glen. It was intended to serve a new suburb being developed during the Celtic Tiger. A lack of subsequent development in the vicinity resulted in Laughanstown being the least used stop on the Luas Network. As of 2022, the land around the stop is again under development and new roads have been constructed close to the stop.

== Location and access ==
Laughanstown is near the southern point of Cabinteely and the northwest of Cherrywood. The stop is surrounded by fields of grass and trees. The nearest road is Lehaunstown Road which is a minute walk from the stop and near the site of where Tully Crossing was on the Harcourt Street line. Grand Parade road is currently being extended along the Luas near the stop.

== Services ==
Trams stop at the stop coming from either end every 10-18 minutes.

Preceding station	Luas	Following station
Carrickmines towards Parnell or Broombridge	Green Line	Cherrywood towards Brides Glen
