= Balrothery Tower =

Tower house in northern County Dublin, Ireland

- Túr Bhaile an Ridire (Irish)
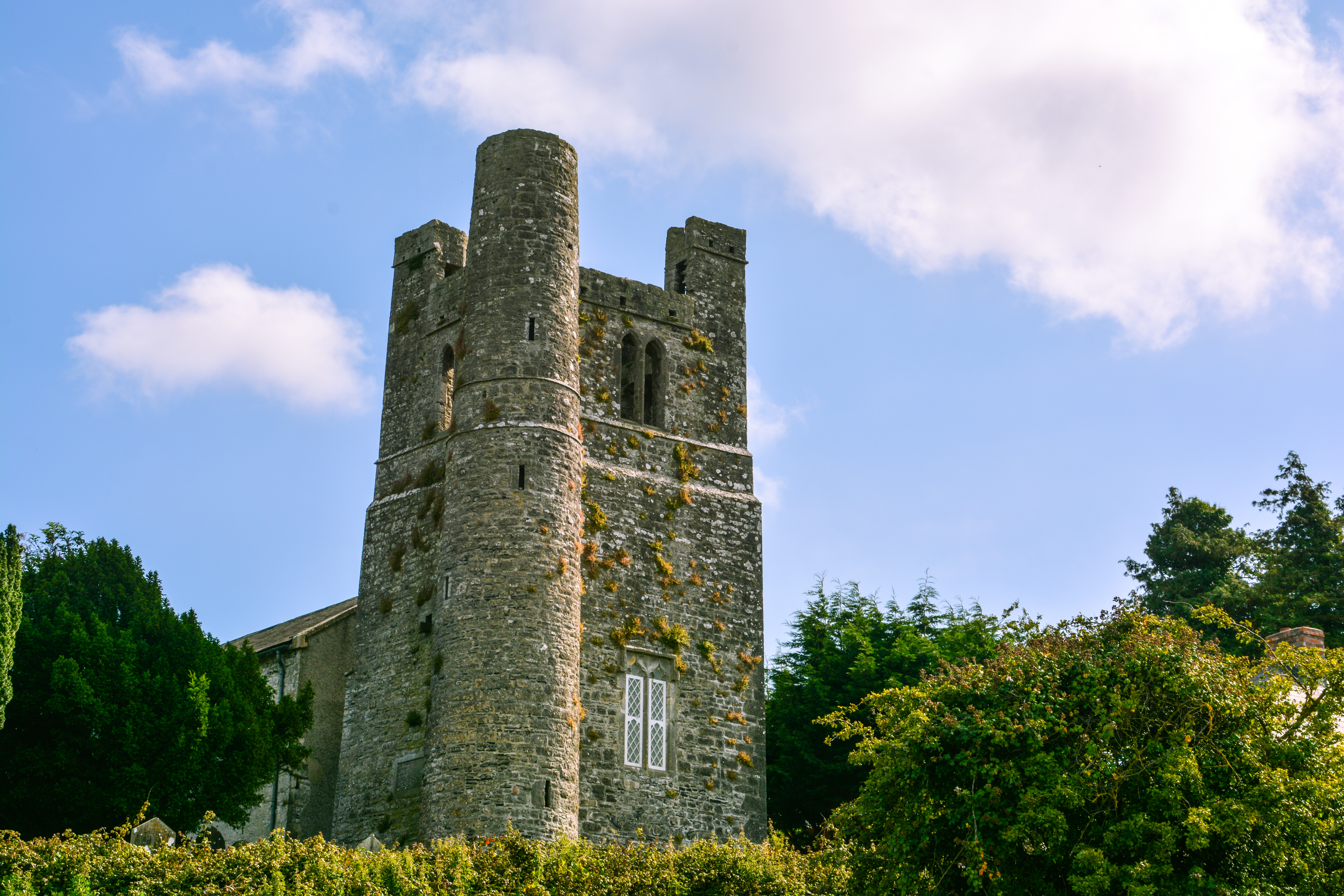

- Location within Ireland
- 53.586532°N 6.189995°W
- Type: tower house
- Location: Coach Road, Balrothery, County Fingal, Ireland

History
- Built: early 16th century

National monument of Ireland
- Official name: Balrothery
- Reference no.: 590

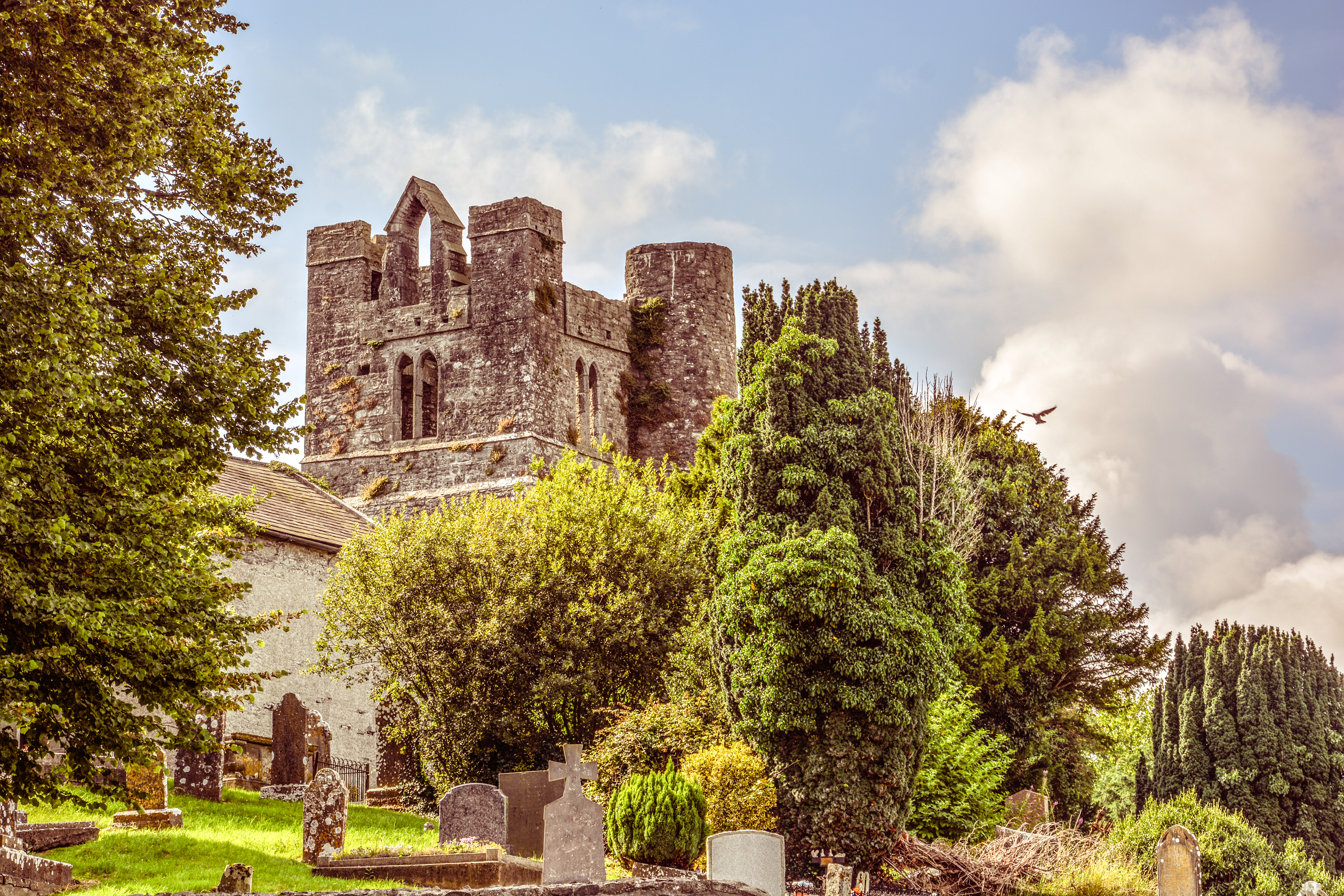
Another view of the tower, with bell-cot visible.

Balrothery Tower is a tower house and a National Monument in Balrothery, Ireland.

== Location ==
The tower house is found in Balrothery, east of the R132, and near Balbriggan, in the northeastern part of County Dublin, Ireland. The local authority is Fingal County Council.

== History ==
An Anglo-Norman ally of Strongbow, Robert de Rosel, was granted Balrothery in c. 1171 "where he built the town and castle". The name derives from the Irish Baile an Ridire, "the knight's town." His son Patrick became the parson of the church in Balrothery, and after his death Geoffrey de Costedin donated lands at Balrothery to Tristernagh Abbey, Kilbixy between 1191 and 1212.

== Building ==
Balrothery Tower is a three-storey square plan rubble stone crenellated tower house built c. 1500. It has trefoil-headed openings with limestone surround and square headed openings with brick-dressed openings. In the northwest corner is a turret with spiral stairway. The top storey of the main tower has a two-light window at each face and the east face has a bell-cote. Lower down in the west wall is a two-light window with ogee heads and a square moulding with one mask.
