= Tully Church =

- Séipéal na Tulaí
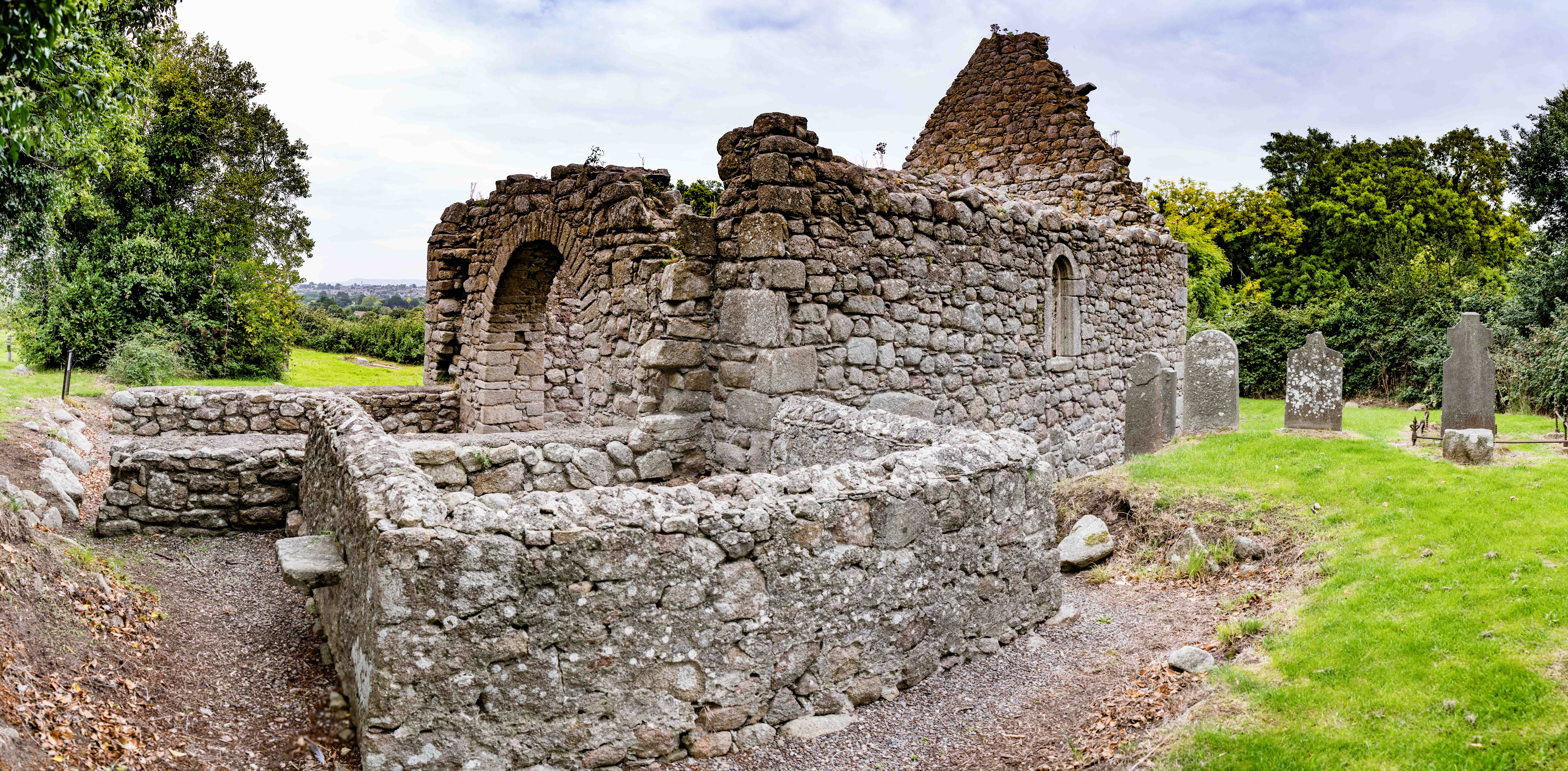

- Location within Dublin
- 53.246818°N 6.152242°W
- Location: Laughanstown, County Dublin, Ireland
- Country: Ireland

History
- Founded: 13th century

Architecture
- Style: Norman
- Years built: late 12th century

Administration
- Diocese: Dublin

National monument of Ireland
- Official name: Tully
- Reference no.: 225

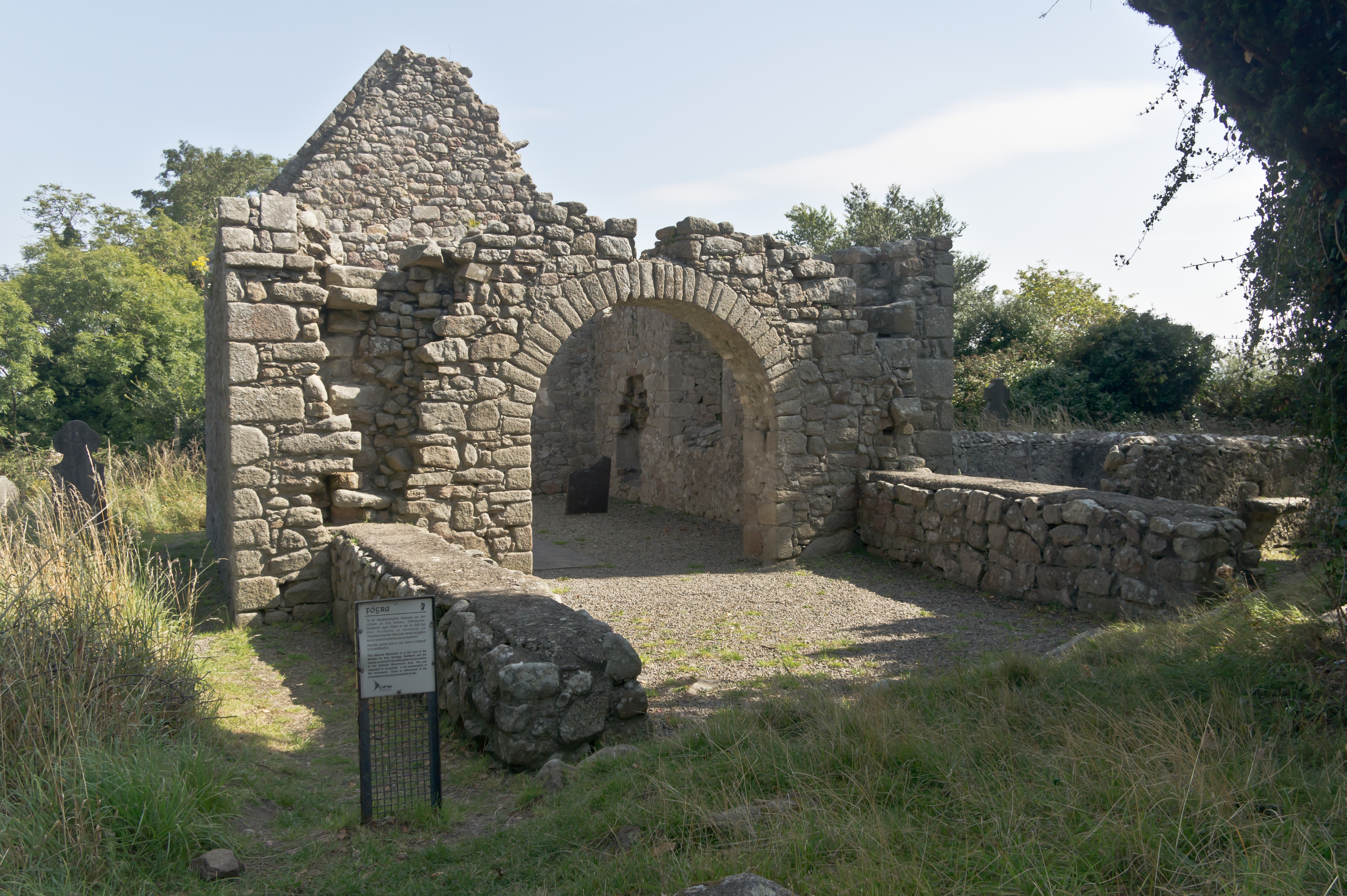
Tully Church

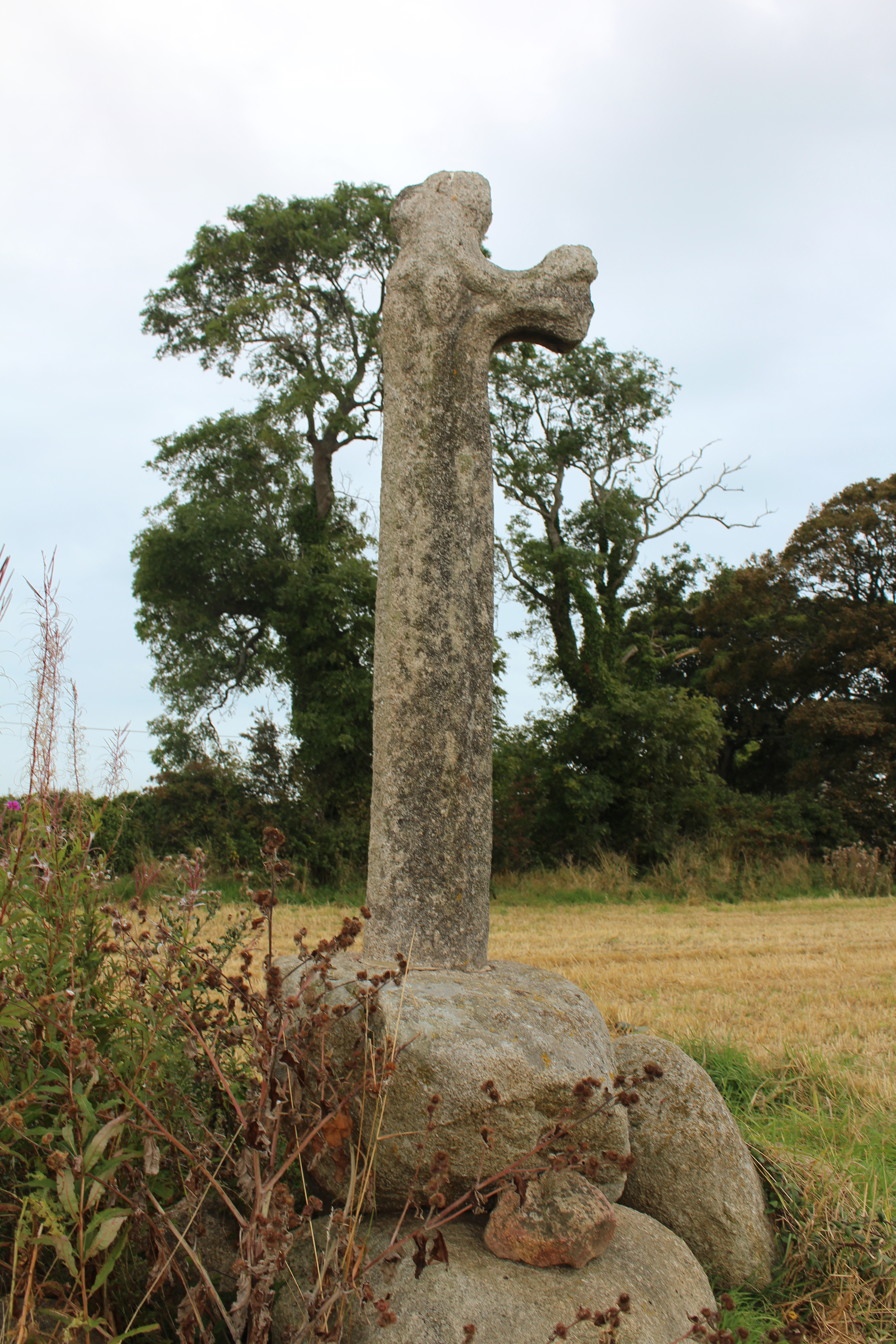
Stone cross at Tully Church

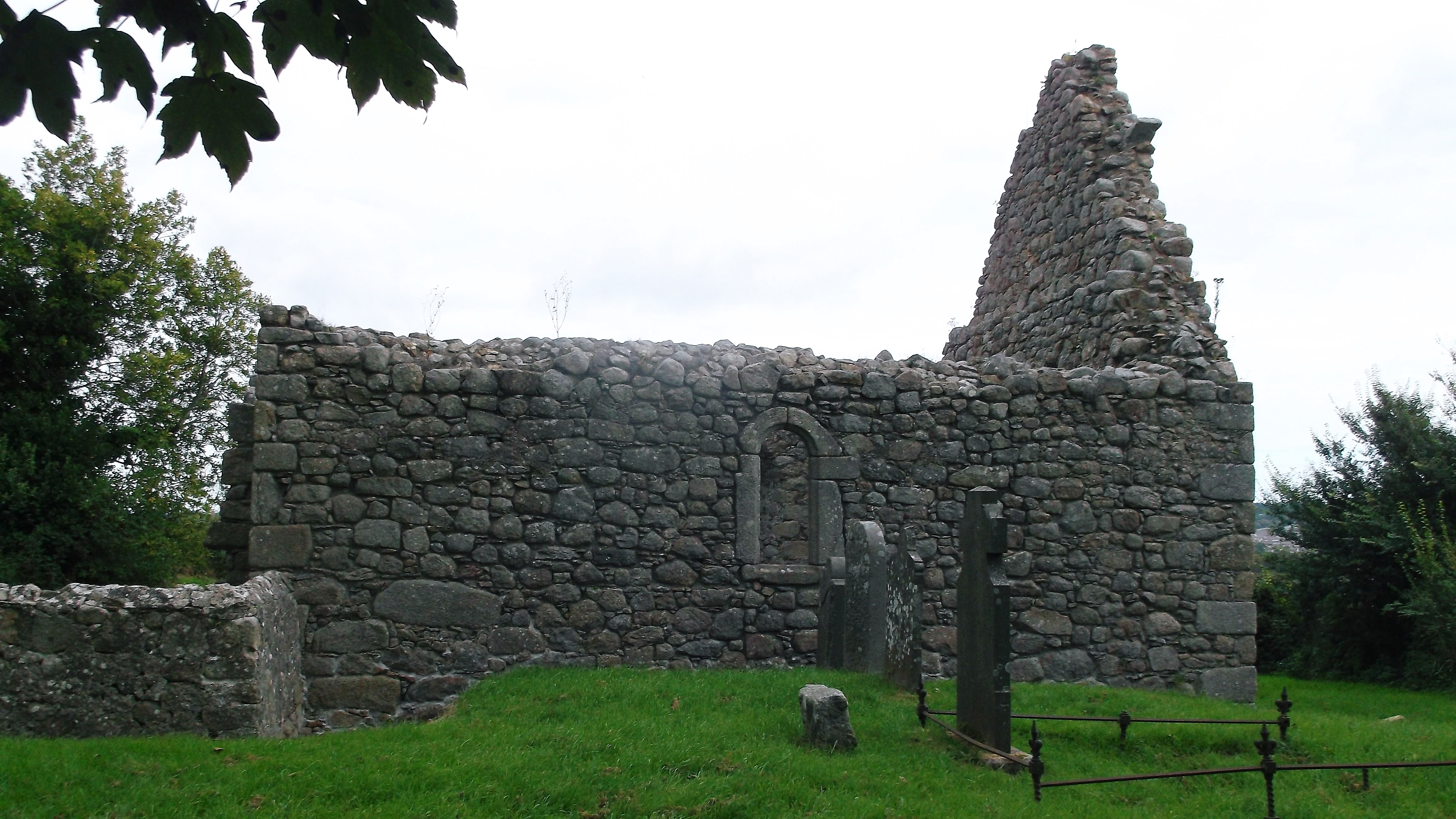
Tully Church

Tully Church is an ancient church in County Dublin, Ireland.

== Location ==
Tully Church lies in Laughanstown (Irish: Baile an Locháin; variously spelled Lehaunestown, Lehaunstown); it is located in Dún Laoghaire–Rathdown, 500 m south-southeast of Laughanstown Luas stop.

Following redevelopment of the surrounding area, the church, its graveyard and the nearby high cross were incorporated into the 9-hectare Tully Park which opened in May 2023.

== The building ==
The original church structure dates to the 6th–9th centuries AD. One ancient name is Telach-na-nEscop (Tullow of the bishops) and it must have been an important venue if bishops met there. There is a legend that seven bishops started out from there to visit St Brigid at Kildare. Elsewhere these bishops are mentioned as the "Seven Bishops of Cabinteely" (Alice Curtayne, Saint Brigid of Ireland)

In 1179 the Church was granted to the Priory of The Holy Spirit.

The chancel, which is wider than the nave, was added in the late 12th or early 13th century by the Normans. The unusually larger chancel was added to the nave during the early 13th century and has a rounded arch and two rounded headed east windows. The nave dates to the 13th century.

The church was in use up to about 1615. It came under the authority of Christ Church Cathedral, Dublin who supplied clergy to keep it going. It was reported to be in good condition when inspected in 1615, but according to a report in 1630 had been badly damaged in recent storms. After that it was abandoned and fell into ruin.

=== Crosses ===
The cross by the roadside is set upon a plinth and is dedicated to James Crehan (Grehan) who apparently saved the Cross from being discarded when the level of the road was being adjusted in the late 1800s. The plinth replicates the soil removed leaving the Cross standing at its original height. There are a set of worn steps on one side of the plinth which allows one to climb up and view the Cross closely.

There is a second cross in the field opposite Tully Church. Previously only accessible via a low wooden fence, it now lies in the middle of a public park, close to a residential area. This cross dates from the 12th century and is also reputed to be dedicated to St Brigit.
