= Kiltiernan Tomb =

Portal tomb (dolmen) south of Dublin, Ireland

- Dolmain Chill Tiarnáin (Irish)
- Location within Dublin
- 53.238829°N 6.207119°W
- Location: Kiltiernan, County Dublin, Ireland
- Region: Ireland

History
- Built: c. 3000 BC

Site notes
- Elevation: 174 m (571 ft)
- Length: 6.5 m (21 ft)
- Width: 5.3 m (17 ft)
- Public access: yes

National monument of Ireland
- Official name: Kiltiernan
- Reference no.: 343

Kiltiernan Tomb, also called Kiltiernan Portal Tomb or Kiltiernan Dolmen, is a dolmen located in County Dublin, Ireland. It is a National Monument.

== Location ==
Kiltiernan Tomb is located about 1.6 km (1 mile) south-southeast of Stepaside.

== The dolmen ==
The dolmen is sited on a small ledge, close to one of the head waters of the Loughlinstown River on a gentle west-facing slope. The capstone measures 6.5 metres (21 ft) in length, 5.3 metres (17 ft) in width and 1.55 metres (5.1 ft) in depth, weighing about 40 tonnes. The two portal stones at the entrance measure 1.4 metres (4.6 ft) and 1.25 metres (4.1 ft) and the tomb is oriented in a westerly direction. Between the portal stones is a small door stone, blocking entrance to the chamber.
