= Glencullen =

Village in County Dublin, Ireland

Glencullen Gleann Cuilinn (Irish)
- Village
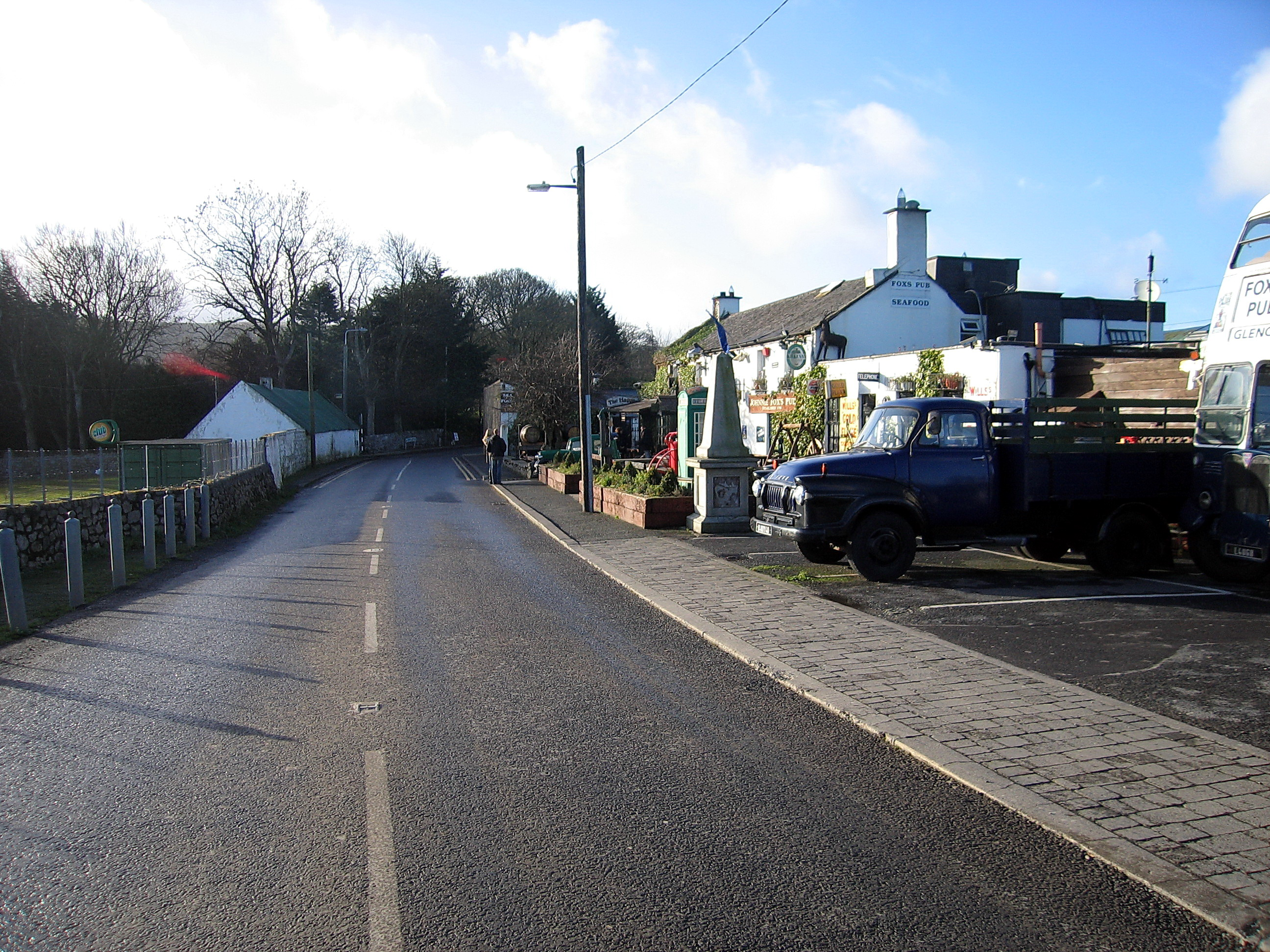
- Glencullen with Johnnie Fox's pub on the right

- Location in Ireland
- Coordinates: 53.223°N 6.216°W
- Country: Ireland
- Province: Leinster
- County: Dún Laoghaire–Rathdown
- Elevation: 276 m (906 ft)

Population (2022)
  - Total: 376
- Eircode routing key: D18
- Area code: 01 (+3531)
- Irish Grid Reference: O186206

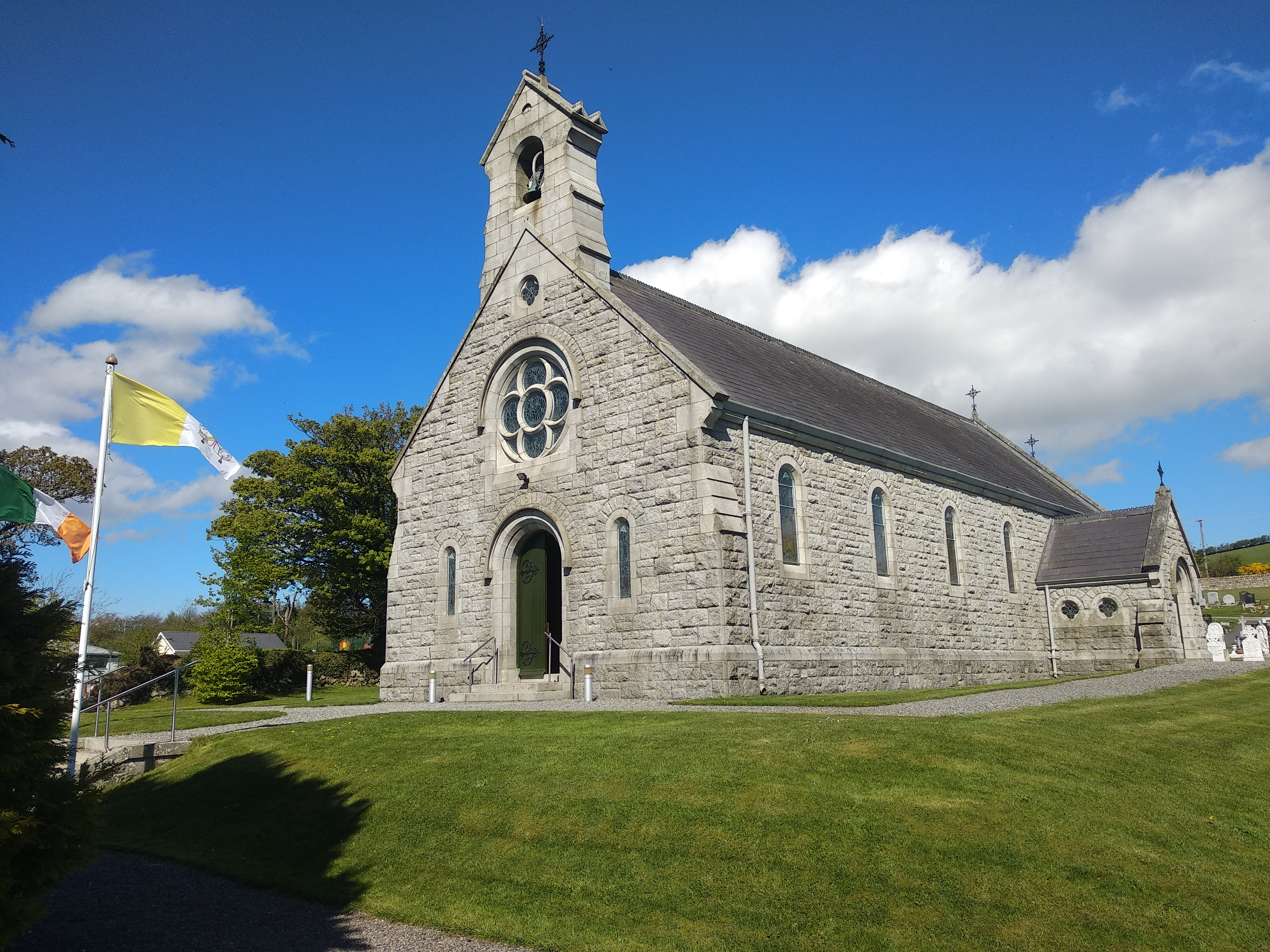
St. Patrick's Church, Glencullen (1909)

Glencullen (Irish: Gleann Cuilinn, meaning 'valley of the holly') is a village and townland in south County Dublin, Ireland. It is 14 km south of Dublin city centre, in the Dún Laoghaire–Rathdown local authority area. Glencullen is also the name of the valley above one end of which the village sits, and from which it takes its name, and is on the R116 road, on the slopes of Two Rock Mountain. The highest point of the area is at a height of about 300 metres (980 ft), making Glencullen one of the highest villages in Ireland.

Glencullen is in the civil parish of Kilternan and the historical barony and Poor Law Union of Rathdown. 376 people lived in the village as of the 2022 census, up from 238 as of the 2016 census.

== Heritage ==
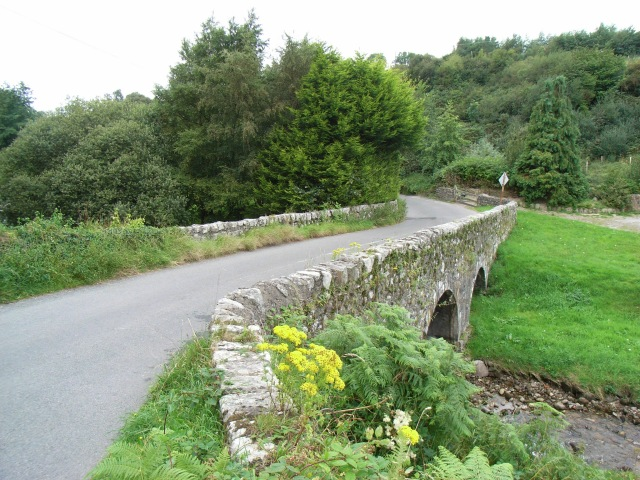
Glencullen Bridge

There is a Bronze Age wedge tomb at Ballyedmonduff on the south-eastern slope of Two Rock Mountain. It is known locally as the giants grave. It is a rectangular chamber divided into three parts surrounded by a U-shaped double-walled kerb filled with stones. The tomb was excavated in the 1940s by Seán P. Ó Riordáin and Ruaidhrí De Valera when cremated bone, a polished stone hammer, flints and pottery were found.

Below Two Rock Mountain is the prominent South Dublin landmark of Three Rock Mountain, complete with its Communications Masts, some of which are visible from Glencullen.

Glencullen also has an important standing stone at Newtown Hill and also has an earthen burial mound dating from the same period as the wedge tomb at Ballyedmonduff. Glencullen Standing Stone also known as Queen Mab is also located in the village.

== Entertainment ==
At the centre of the village is Johnnie Fox's Pub, which was established in 1798, the year of the Irish Rebellion led by Theobald Wolfe Tone. The pub has an active business in Irish-themed entertainment, and draws substantial coach and car traffic.

== Amenities ==
The part-time library is housed in a Carnegie building, dating back to 1907.

St. Patrick's National School (a national primary school) is in Glencullen.

== Sport ==
The Stars of Erin (Irish: Réaltaí na hÉireann ) are the local Gaelic Athletic Association club. They were founded in 1903 and have two All Ireland Club titles, and are holders of the Paddy Mulligan Cup.

The area is also home to a mountain bike park named Glencullen Adventure Park (The Gap).

== Transport ==
The number 44B Dublin Bus service runs from the Dundrum Luas station to Glencullen. There is also a private coach service run by the pub Johnnie Fox's nearby from Dublin City Centre to the pub.

== History ==
In August 1841 the village was the centre of the agitation movement against Robert Peel's government when the "cabinet council" was convened at Fitzsimon's seat. Attendees included Viscount Morpeth and Frederick Romilly. During the Fenian Insurrection of 1867, the nine policemen of Glencullen barracks surrendered to the Irish Republic.

== People ==
Glencullen was home to the politician Christopher Fitzsimon, son-in-law of Daniel O'Connell

Glencullen features heavily in Dennis Kennedy's memoirs entitled Square Peg.

== See also ==
- List of towns and villages in Ireland
