= Brennanstown Portal Tomb =

- Tuama Ursanach Bhaile Uí Bhraonáin (Irish)
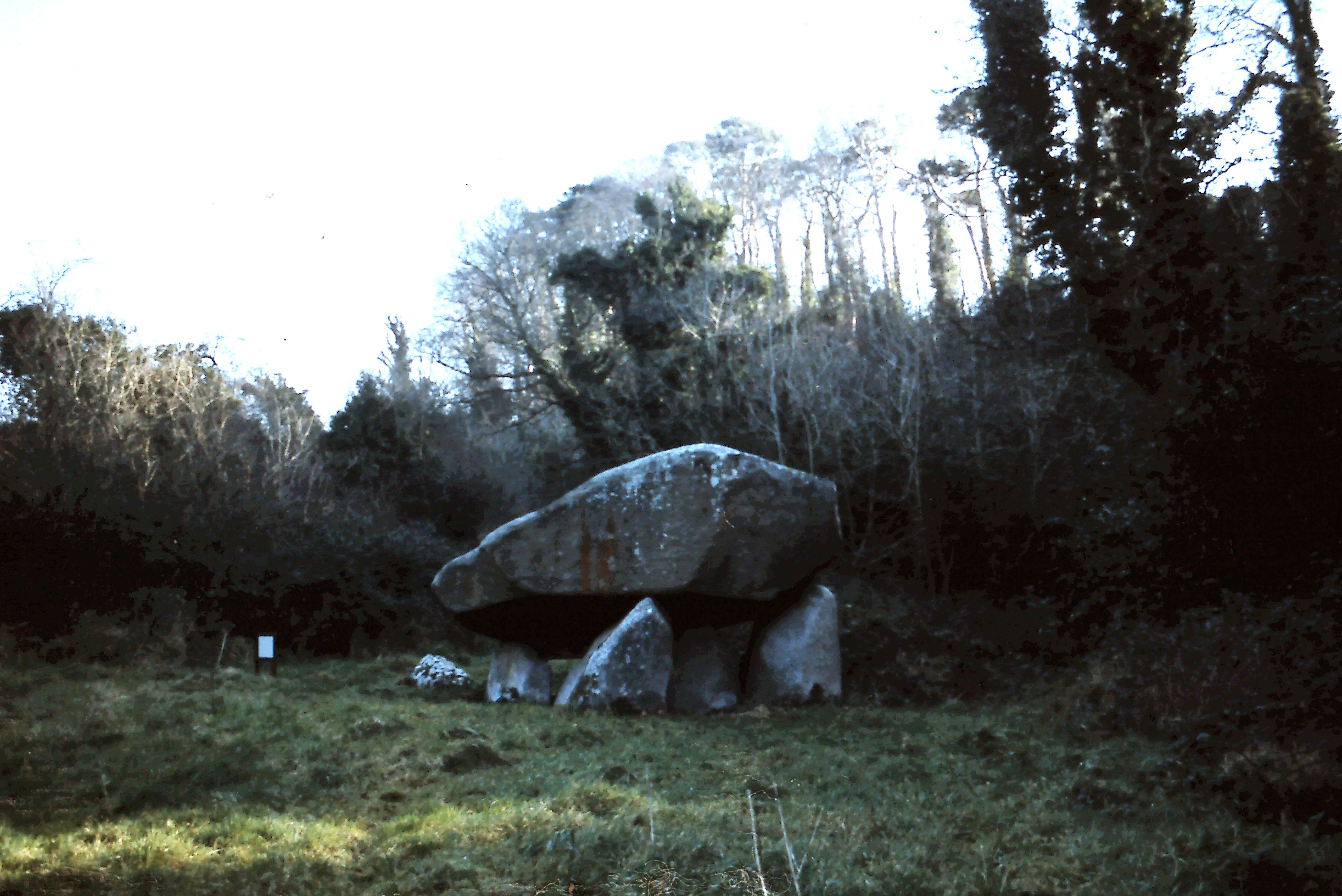
- The tomb from the North-West

- Location within Dublin
- 53.253821°N 6.158731°W
- Type: Dolmen
- Location: County Dublin, Ireland

History
- Built: c. 2500 BC

National monument of Ireland
- Official name: Brenanstown
- Reference no.: 291

Brennanstown Portal Tomb, also called Glendruid Dolmen or Cabinteely Dolmen, is a dolmen constructed in Prehistoric Ireland and located in County Dublin. It is a National Monument.

== Location ==
Brennanstown Portal Tomb lies on the north bank of the Carrickmines River, a tributary of the Loughlinstown River, about 1.2 km (0.75 mi) south of Cabinteely.

== Gallery ==
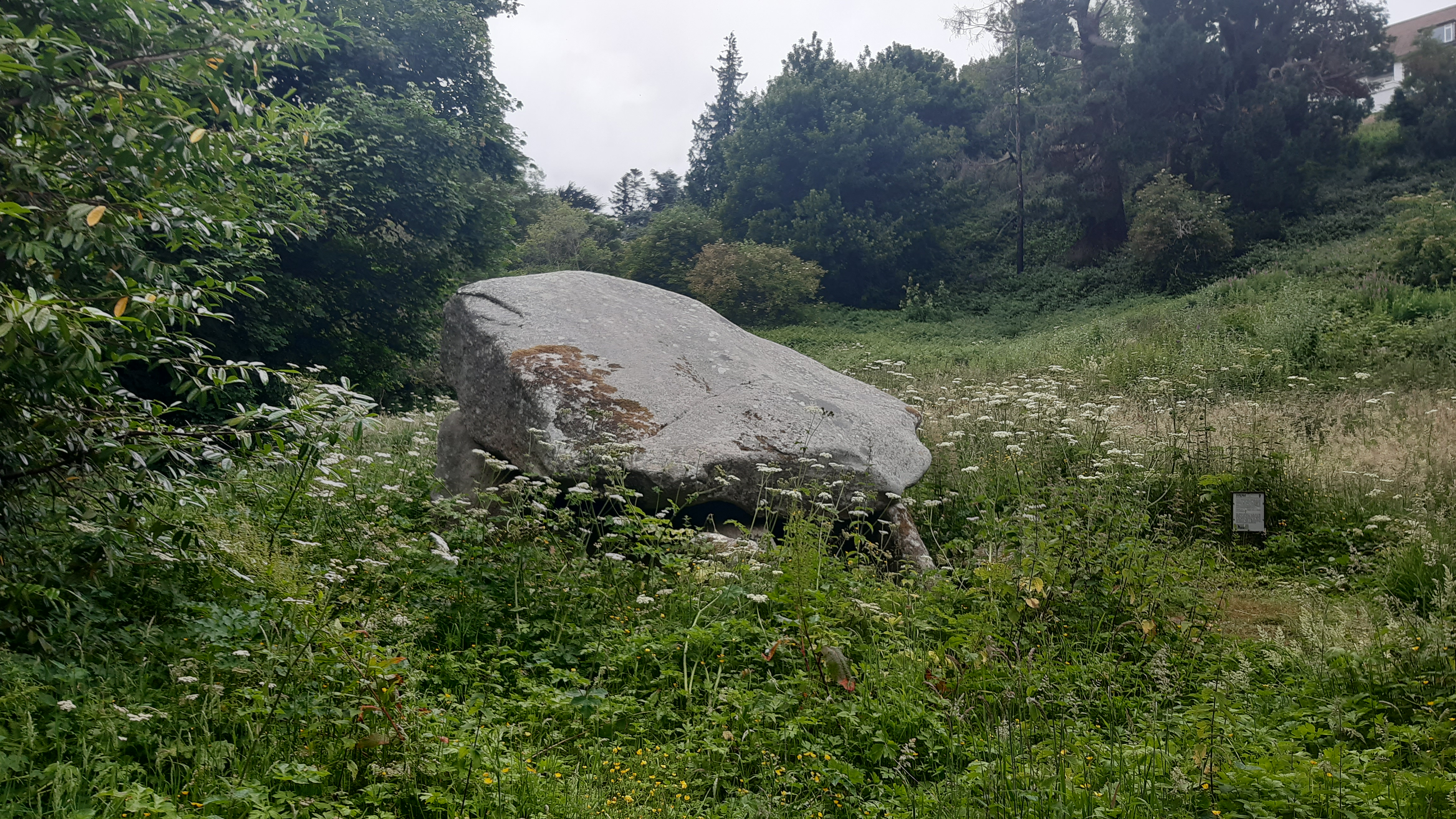
The tomb in June 2024, surrounded by giant hogweed

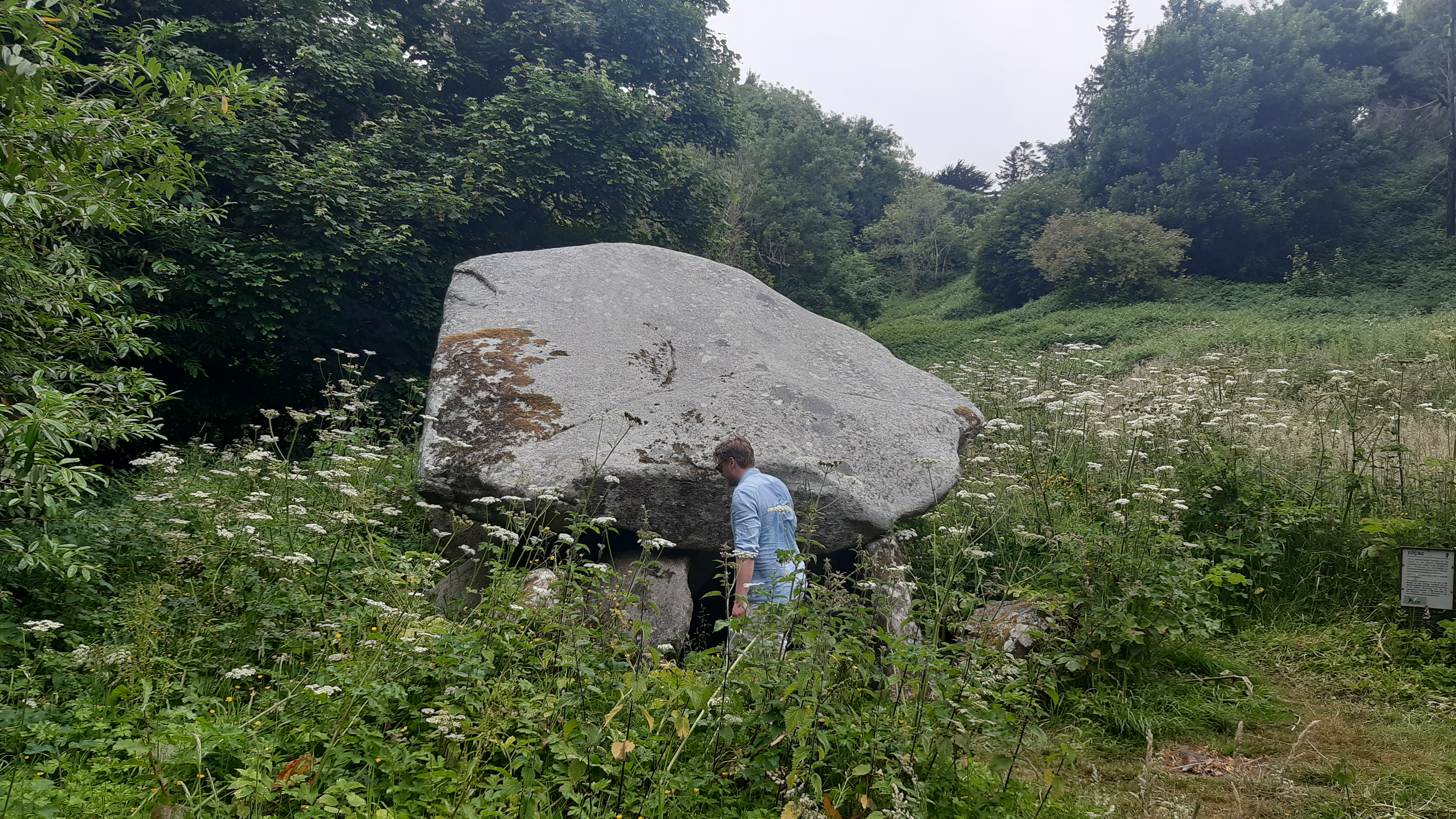
Size in comparison to an adult

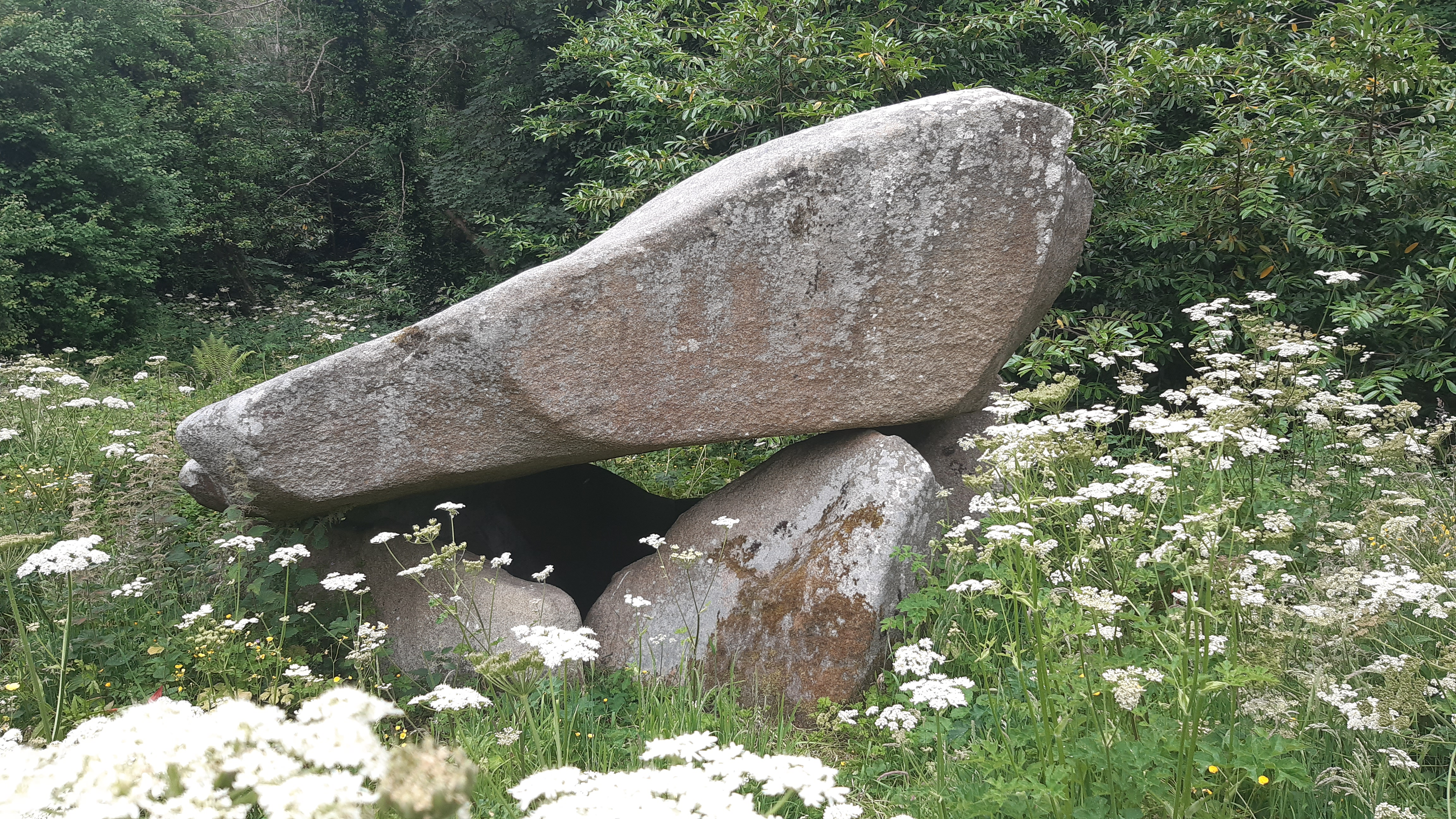
View from the north

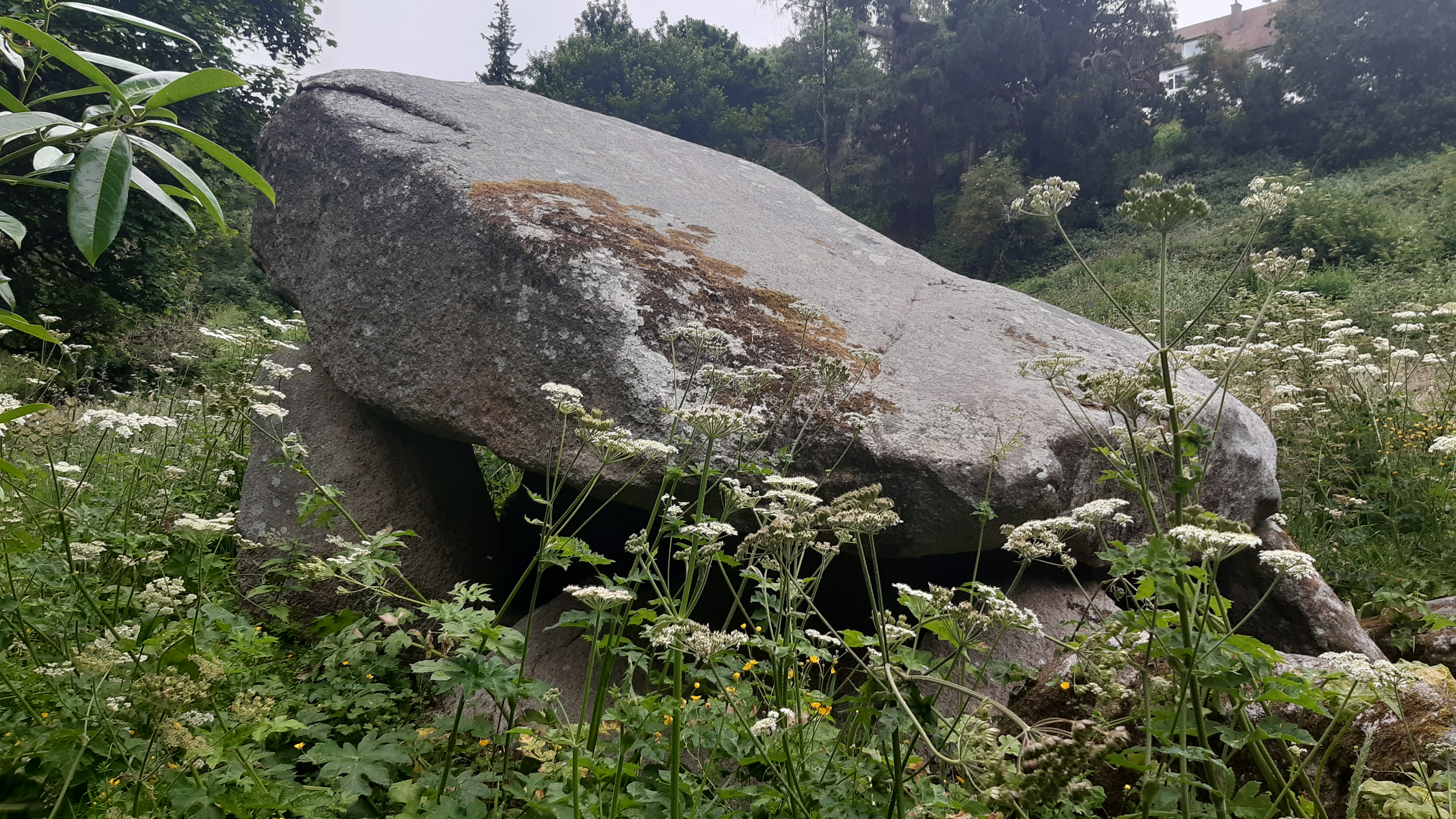
View from the south

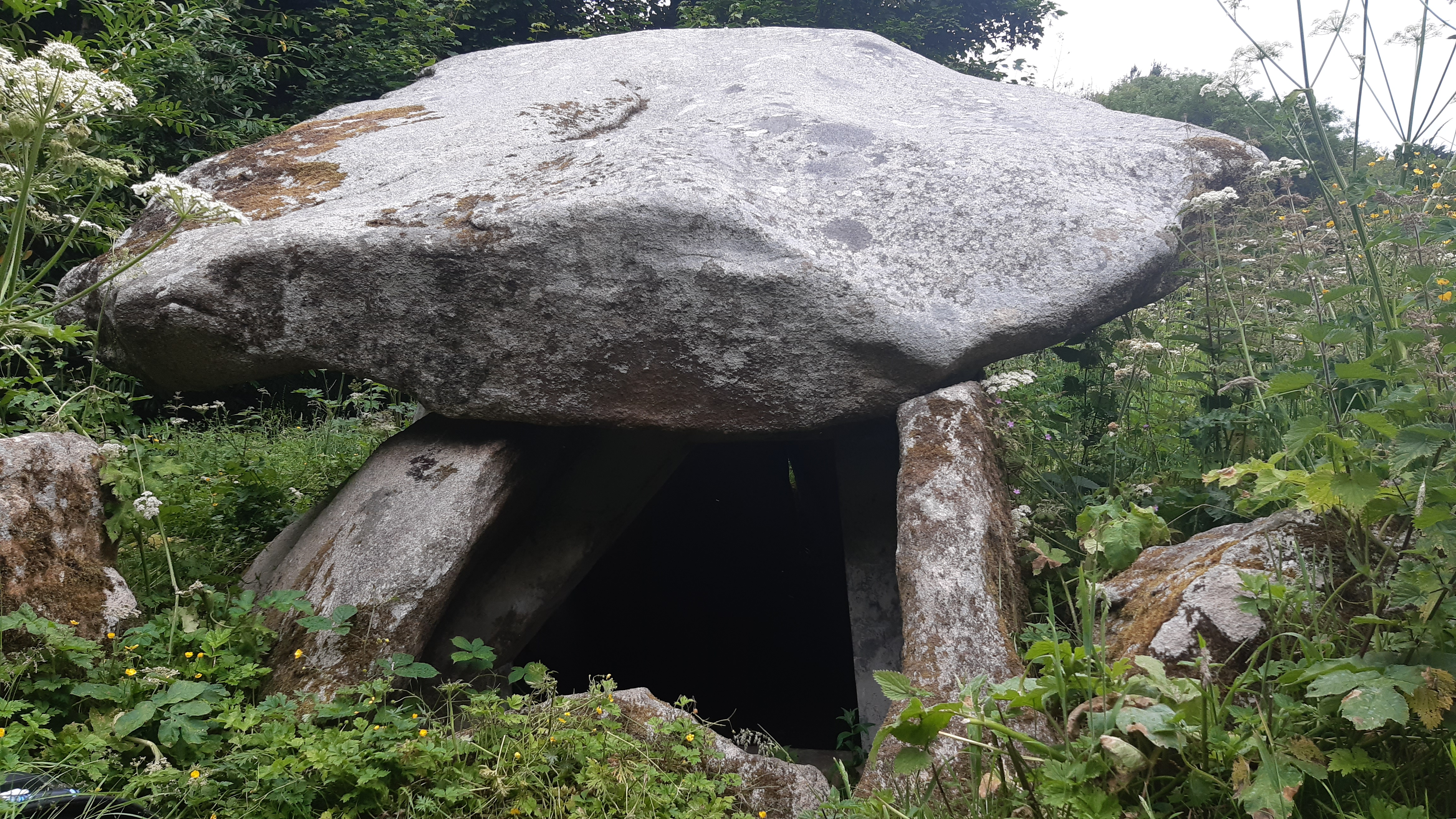
View from the east

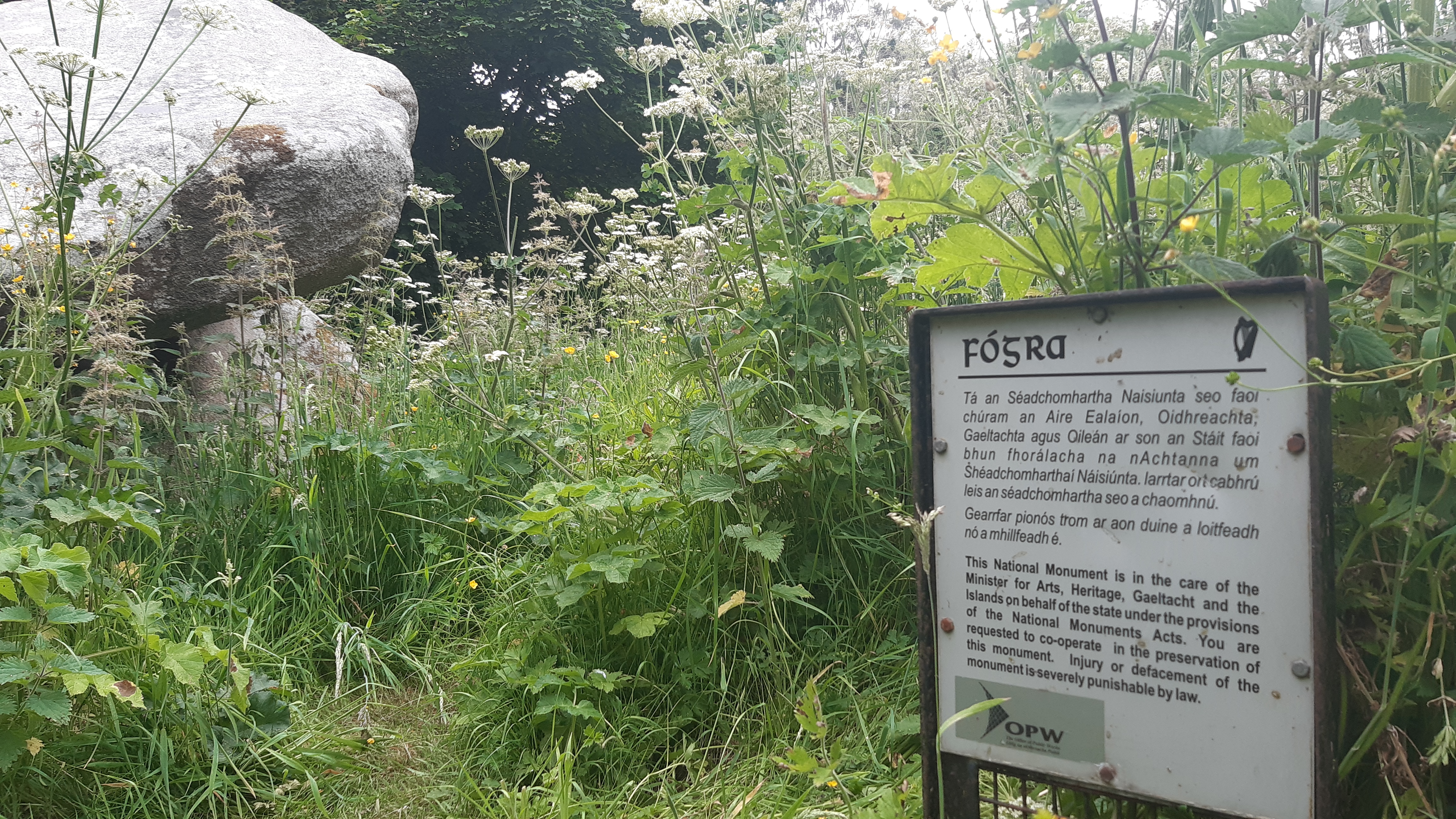
OPW notice (Irish: Fógra) at the national monument
