= Abbey Street Luas stop =

Tram stop in Dublin, Ireland

Abbey Street Sráid na Mainistreach
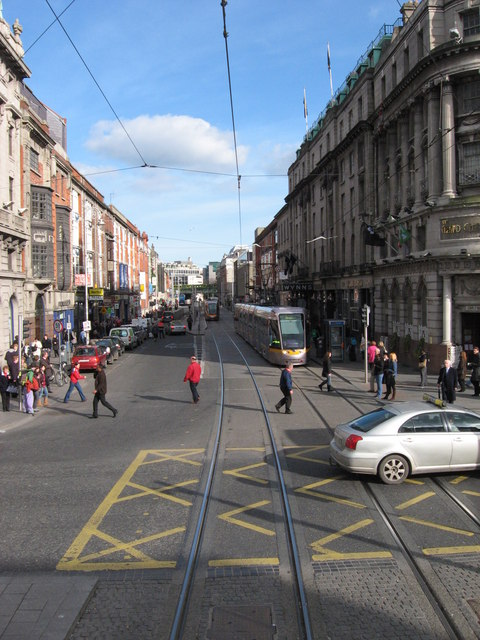
- Two trams at Abbey Street

General information
- Location: Lower Abbey Street; Dublin; Ireland
- Coordinates: 53°20′55″N 6°15′29″W
- Owner: Transport Infrastructure Ireland
- Operator: Transdev (as Luas)
- Line: Red
- Platforms: 2

Construction
- Structure type: At-grade

Other information
- Fare zone: Central

History
- Opened: 26 September 2004; 22 years ago

Key dates
- 9 December 2017: Connection with Green Line opened
Location
- Location within Central Dublin

Abbey Street (Irish: Sráid na Mainistreach) is a stop on the Luas light-rail tram system in Dublin, Ireland. It opened in 2004 as a stop on the Red Line.

== Location and access ==
The Red Line runs east to west along Abbey Street through the city centre, and the Abbey Street stop is located between O'Connell Street and Marlborough Street, on two lanes reserved for trams. The stop allows access to the O'Connell Street shopping district, the Spire of Dublin and the Abbey Theatre. It has two edge platforms: the westbound platform is integrated into the pavement, and the eastbound platform is an island between the tracks and the single lane used by road traffic.

When the Luas was first opened, the two lines did not connect, and Abbey Street was the closest point on the Red line to St. Stephen's Green, the terminus of the Green Line, over a kilometre's walk away. In 2017, Luas Cross City - a construction project which extended the Green Line into north Dubin - was completed, and Abbey Street now forms part of a direct interchange between the two lines. The Green Line travels north through the city centre in a one-way system, with the two tracks crossing the red line on either side of the Abbey Street stop. Located in adjacent streets are O'Connell - GPO for trams traveling north, and Marlborough for trams traveling south. These three stops effectively form one four-platform interchange, and signs on the platforms direct passengers between the lines. The stop also connects with a great number of Dublin Bus routes.

== Services ==
Trams stop at the stop coming from either end every 2-10 minutes.

Preceding station	Luas	Following station
Jervis towards Saggart or Tallaght	Red Line	Busáras towards The Point or Connolly
O'Connell Upper towards Parnell or Broombridge	Green Line transfer at O'Connell - GPO	Westmoreland One-way operation
Parnell One-way operation	Green Line transfer at Marlborough	Trinity towards Sandyford or Brides Glen

== Incidents ==
On 16 September 2009, a westbound tram on the approach to Abbey Street stop collided with a double-decker bus travelling north on O'Connell Street. There were 21 injuries, and three people were seriously hurt, including the tram driver Oriyomi Emmanuel, who had to be cut out of his cab after it was crushed against the bus. Emmanuel was later charged with driving the tram in an unsafe manner after evidence showed that he had violated a blocked signal. He was acquitted, and an internal report suggested that the aspect of the signal had not been clear.

== Gallery ==
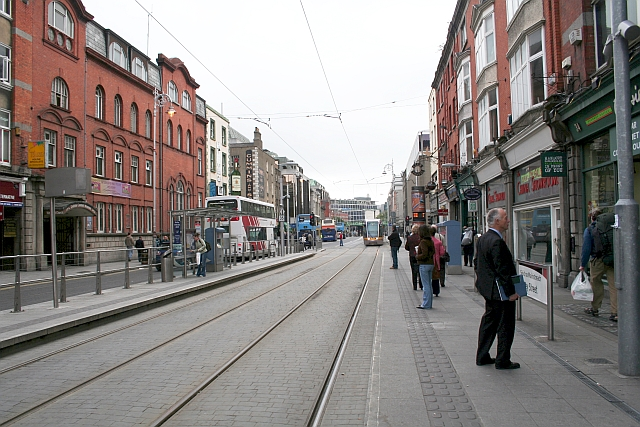
The view looking east from Abbey Street

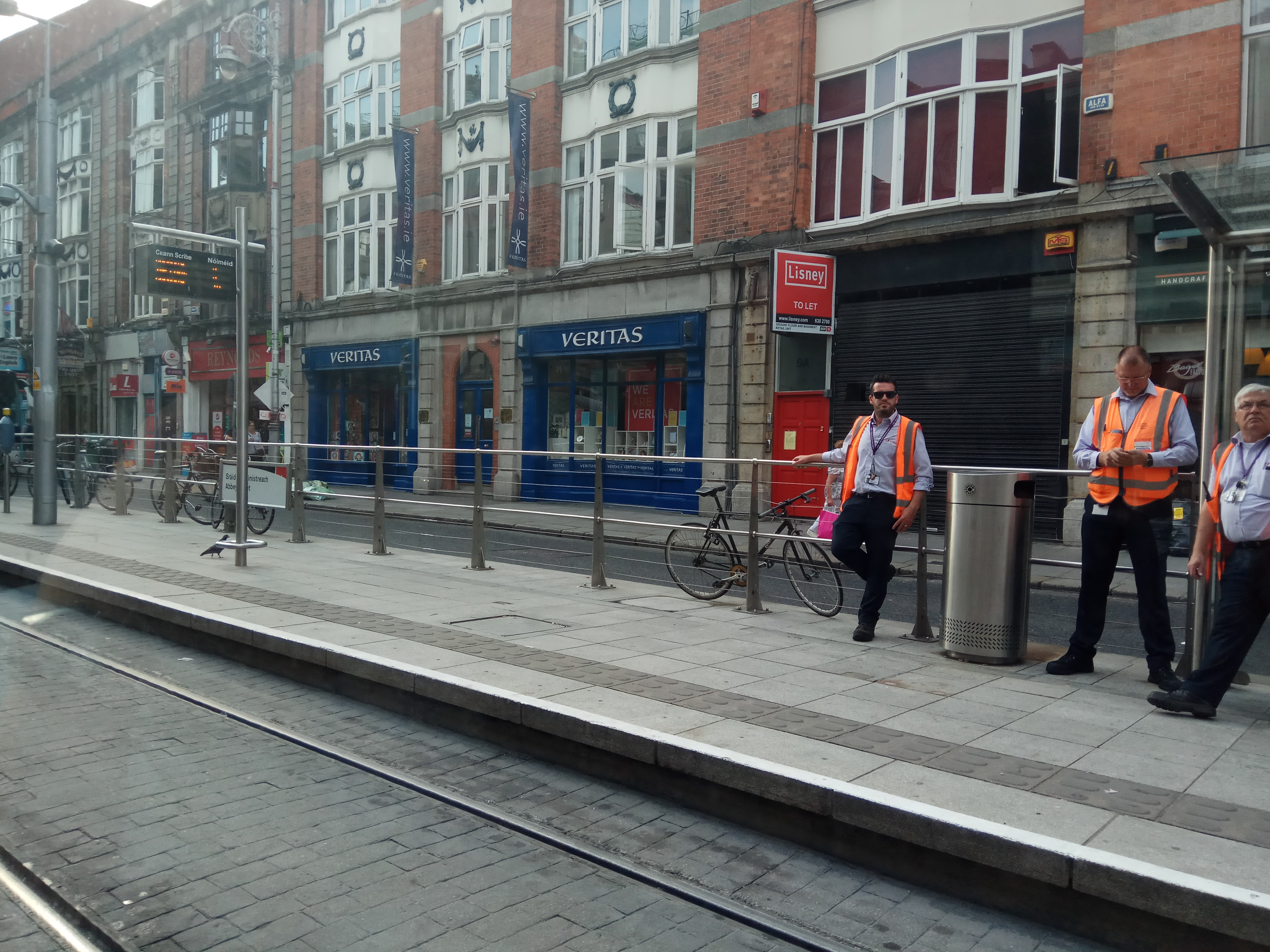
Luas ticket inspectors await a tram at Abbey Street

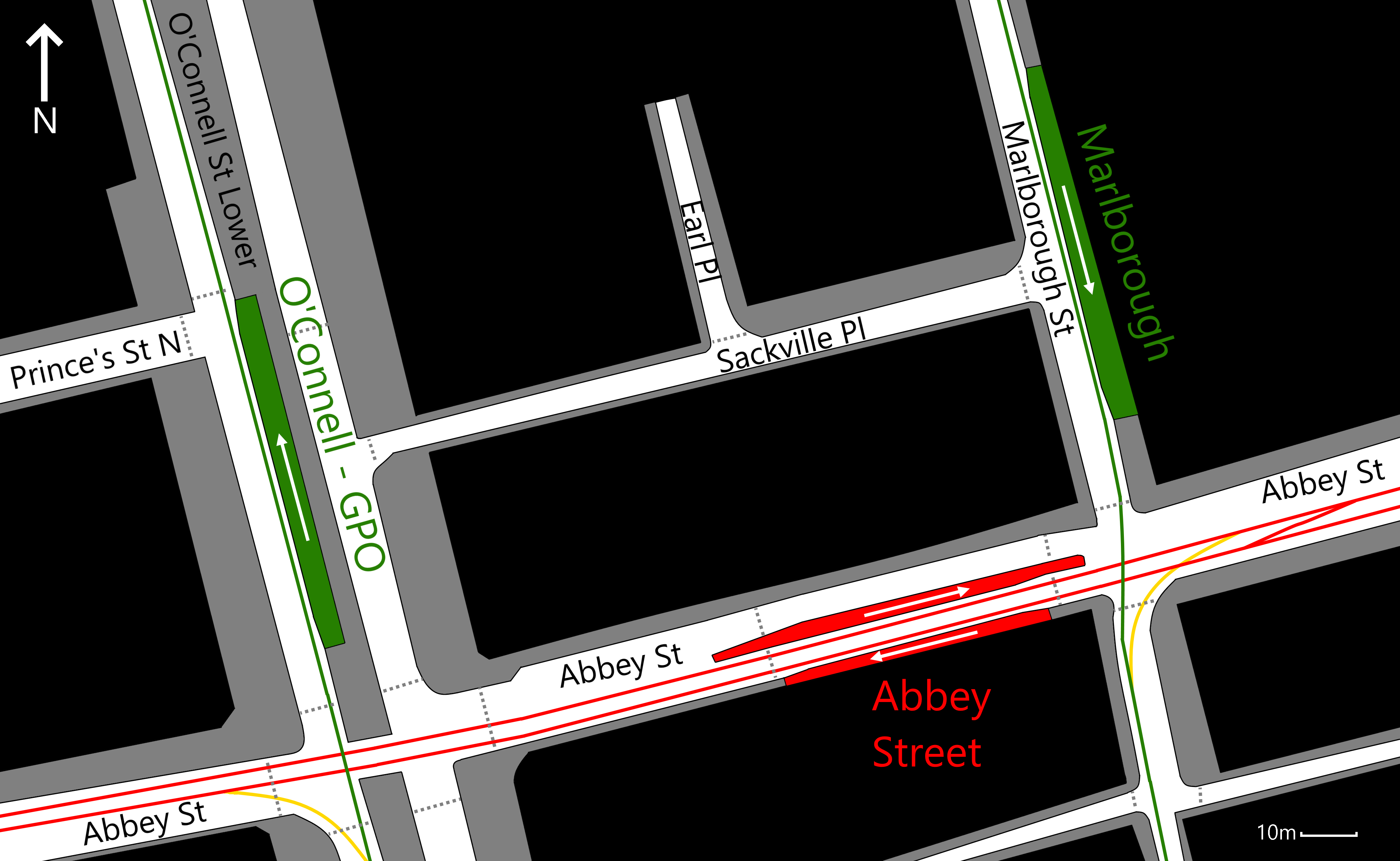
Street plan showing the interchange between the Red and Green lines
