= O'Connell - GPO Luas stop =

Tram stop in Dublin, Ireland

O'Connell - GPO Ó Conaill - AOP
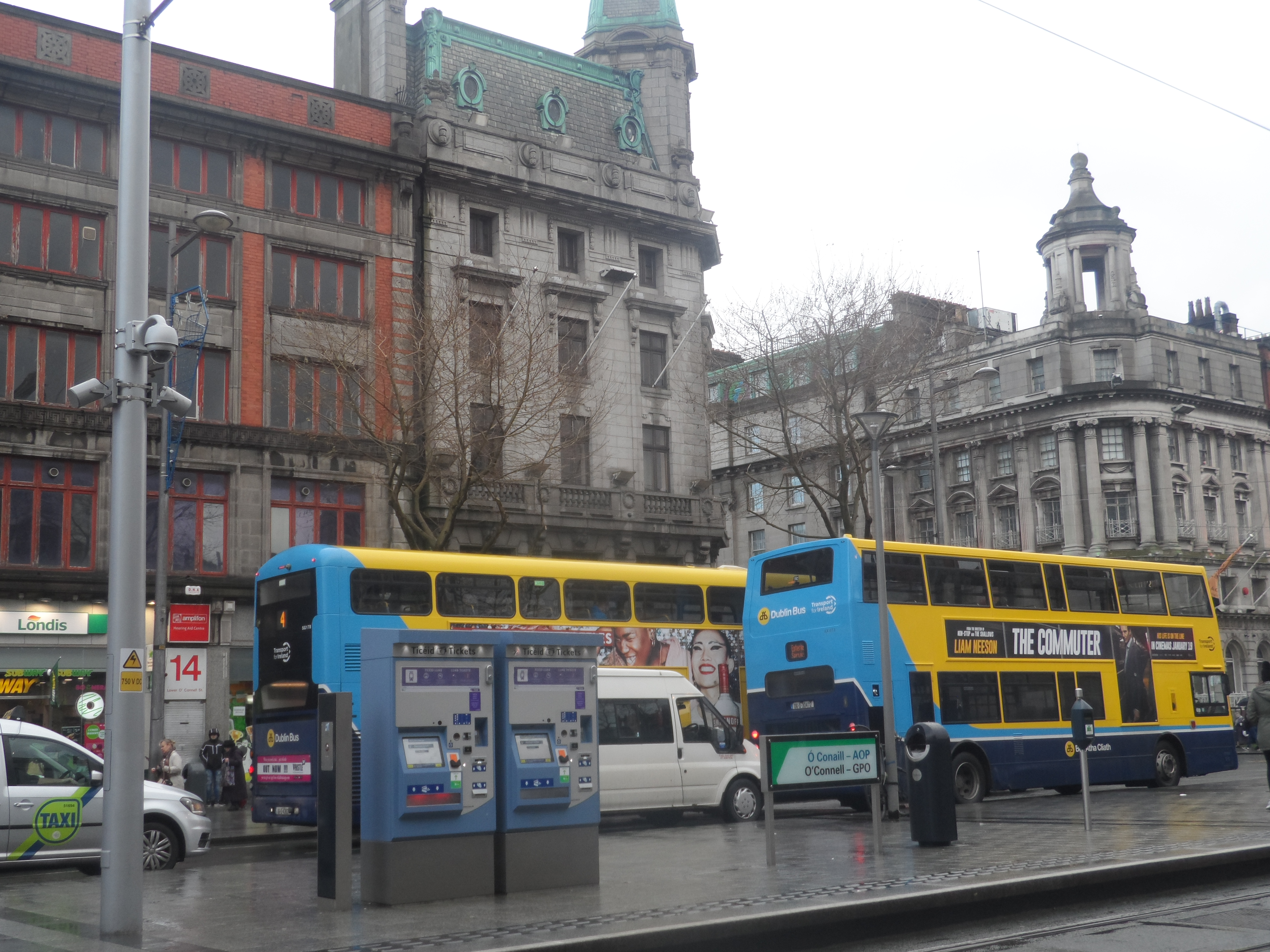
- The platform at O'Connell - GPO

General information
- Location: O'Connell Street, Dublin; Dublin; Ireland
- Coordinates: 53°20′56″N 6°15′36″W
- Owner: Transdev
- Operator: Luas
- Line: Green
- Platforms: 1

Construction
- Structure type: At-grade

Other information
- Fare zone: Central

Key dates
- 9 December 2017: Stop opened

Services
| Preceding station | Luas | Following station |
|---|---|---|
| O'Connell Upper towards Parnell or Broombridge | Green Line | Westmoreland One-way operation |
| Jervis towards Saggart or Tallaght | Red Line transfer at Abbey Street | Busáras towards The Point or Connolly |
Location
- Location within Central Dublin

O'Connell - GPO (Irish: Ó Conaill - AOP) is a stop on the Luas light-rail tram system in Dublin, Ireland. It opened in 2017 as a stop on Luas Cross City, an extension of the Green Line through the city centre from St. Stephen's Green to Broombridge. It is located on O'Connell Street, a short distance from the General Post Office and provides access to the Spire of Dublin.

== Location and interchange ==
O'Connell - GPO's single platform is located to the east of the tracks, integrated into the central reservation of O'Connell Street. It is a stop on the one-way system at the centre of the green line, and forms part of an interchange with the Red Line. It is situated around the corner from the southbound Marlborough stop and the Red line's Abbey Street stop.

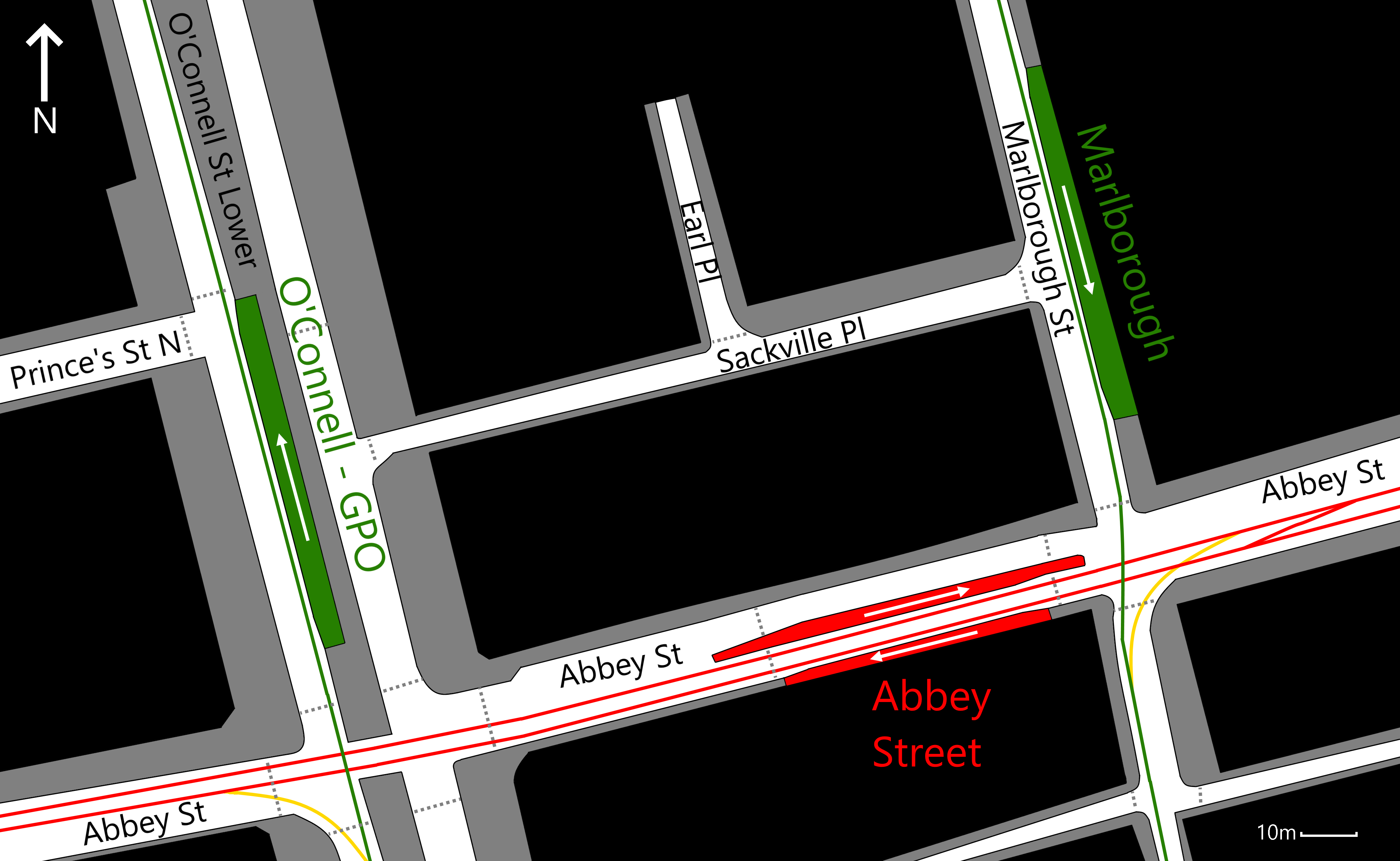
Street plan showing the interchange between the Red and Green lines
