= Marlborough Luas stop =

Tram stop in Dublin, Ireland

Marlborough Maoilbhríde
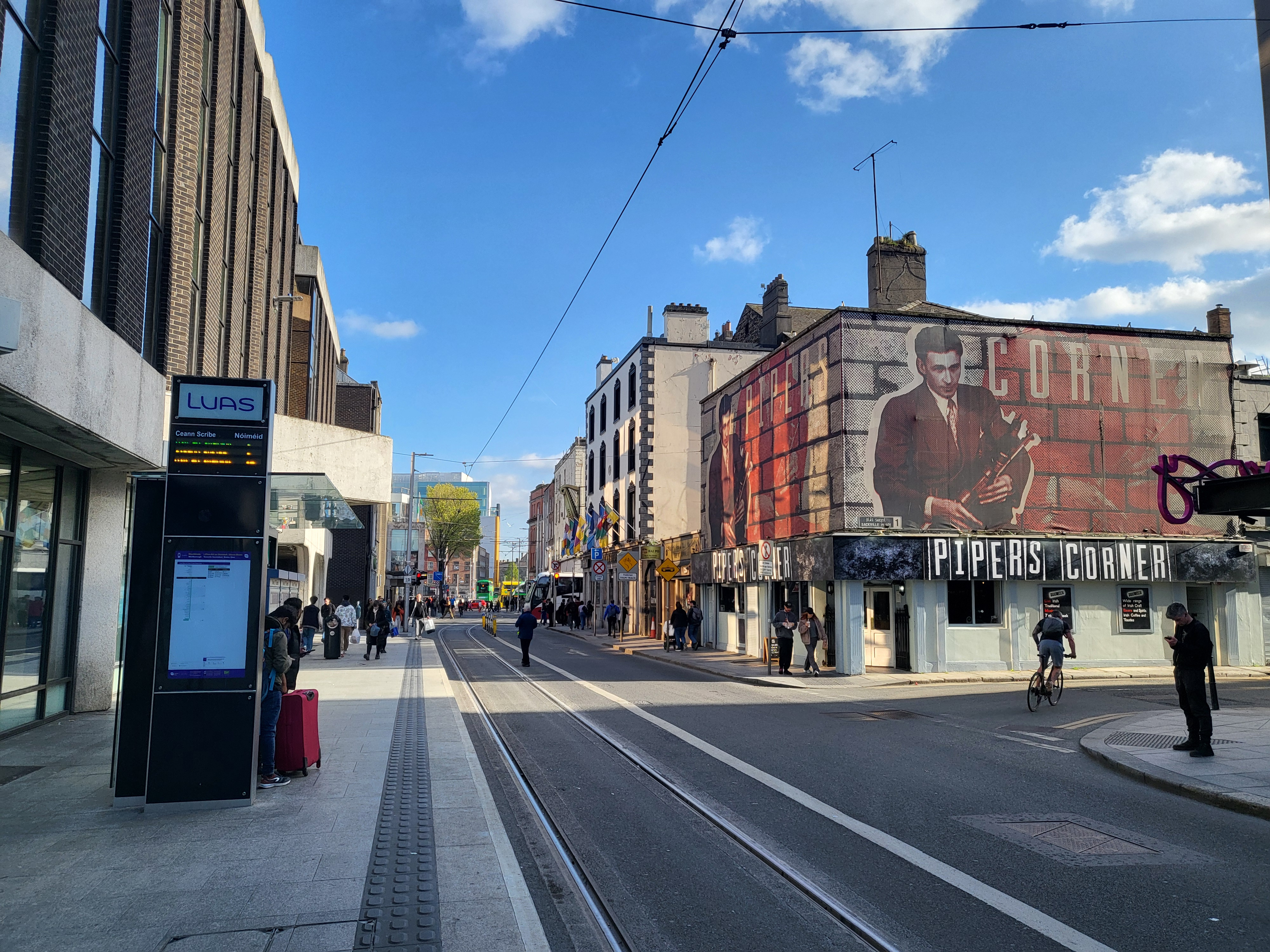
- Marlborough stop

General information
- Location: Dublin; Ireland
- Coordinates: 53°20′57″N 6°15′28″W
- Owner: Transport Infrastructure Ireland
- Operator: Luas
- Line: Green
- Platforms: 1

Construction
- Structure type: At-grade

Other information
- Fare zone: Central

Key dates
- 9 December 2017: Stop opened

Services
Preceding station	Luas	Following station
Parnell One-way operation	Green Line	Trinity towards Sandyford or Brides Glen
Jervis towards Saggart or Tallaght	Red Line transfer at Abbey Street	Busáras towards The Point or Connolly
Location
- Location within Central Dublin

Marlborough (Irish: Maoilbhríde) is a stop on the Luas light-rail tram system in Dublin, Ireland. It opened in 2017 as a stop on Luas Cross City, an extension of the Green Line through the city centre from St. Stephen's Green to Parnell or Broombridge. It is located on Marlborough Street north of the junction with Abbey Street and provides access to Saint Mary's Cathedral.

== Location and interchange ==
Marlborough's single platform is located to the east of the tracks, integrated into the pavement. It is a stop on the one-way system at the centre of the green line, and forms part of an interchange with the Red Line. It is situated around the corner from the northbound O'Connell - GPO Luas stop and the Red line's Abbey Street Luas stop.

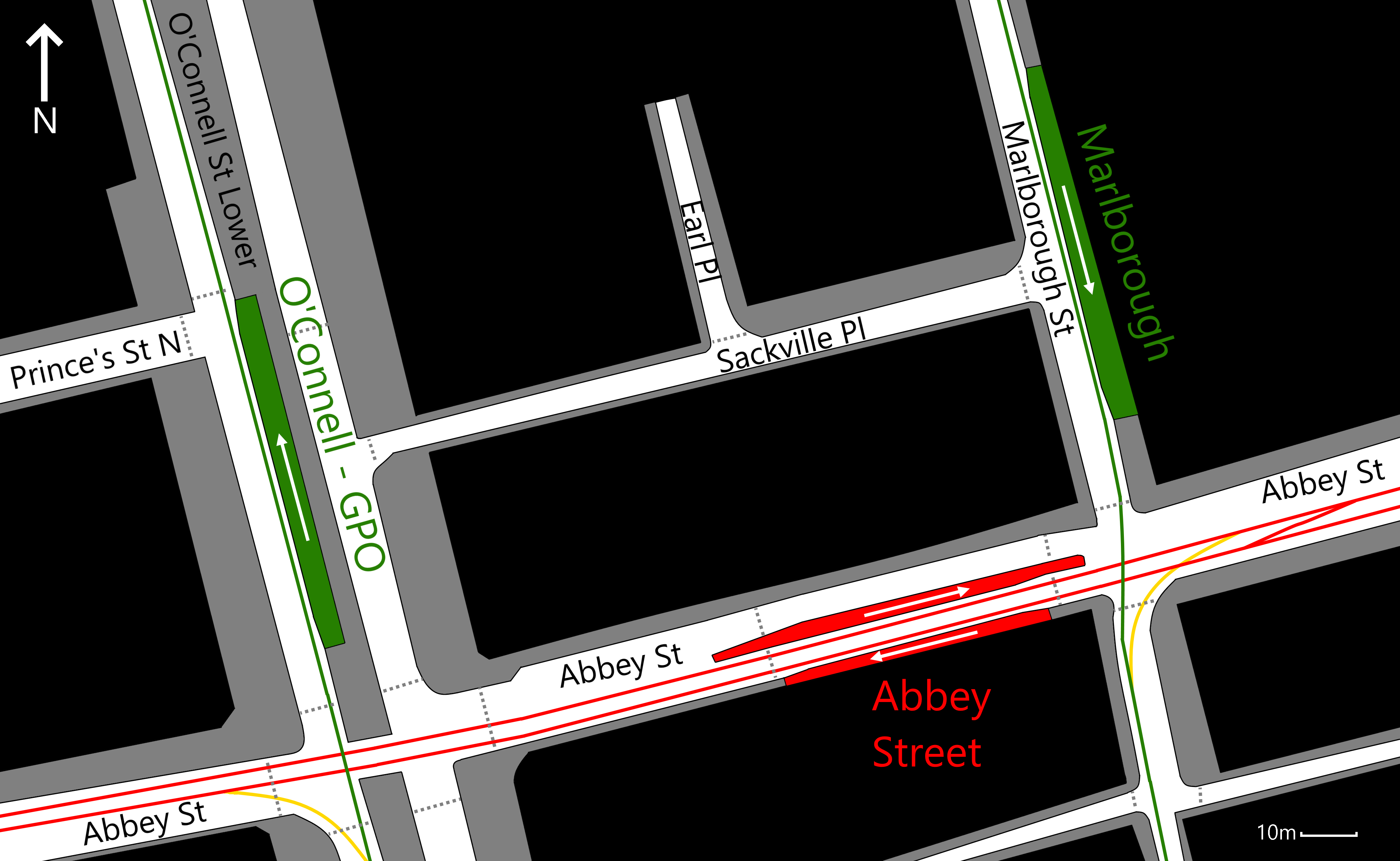
Street plan showing the interchange between the Red and Green lines
