= Dawson Luas stop =

Tram stop in Dublin, Ireland

Dawson Dásain
- Luas platform at Dawson

General information
- Location: Dawson Street, Dublin; Dublin; Ireland
- Coordinates: 53°20′32″N 6°15′29″W
- Owner: Transdev
- Operator: Luas
- Line: Green
- Platforms: 2

Construction
- Structure type: At-grade

Other information
- Fare zone: Central

Key dates
- 9 December 2017: Stop opened

Services
Preceding station	Luas	Following station
Westmoreland towards Parnell or Broombridge	Green Line	St Stephen's Green towards Sandyford or Brides Glen
Trinity One-way operation	Green Line	St Stephen's Green towards Sandyford or Brides Glen
Location
- Location within Central Dublin

Dawson (Irish: Dásain) is a stop on the Luas light-rail tram system in Dublin, Ireland. It opened in 2017 as the first stop on Luas Cross City, an extension of the Green Line through the city centre from St. Stephen's Green to Broombridge. It is located on Dawson Street and provides access to the Grafton Street shopping district, the seat of the legislature at Leinster House on Kildare Street, St. Ann's Church, the Kerlin Gallery, Mansion House (the Lord Mayor's residence), and the National Library of Ireland, as well as Trinity College Dublin (Arts Block entrance). Its side platforms are integrated into the pavement.
