= Four Courts Luas stop =

Tram stop in Dublin, Ireland

Four Courts Na Ceithre Cúirteanna
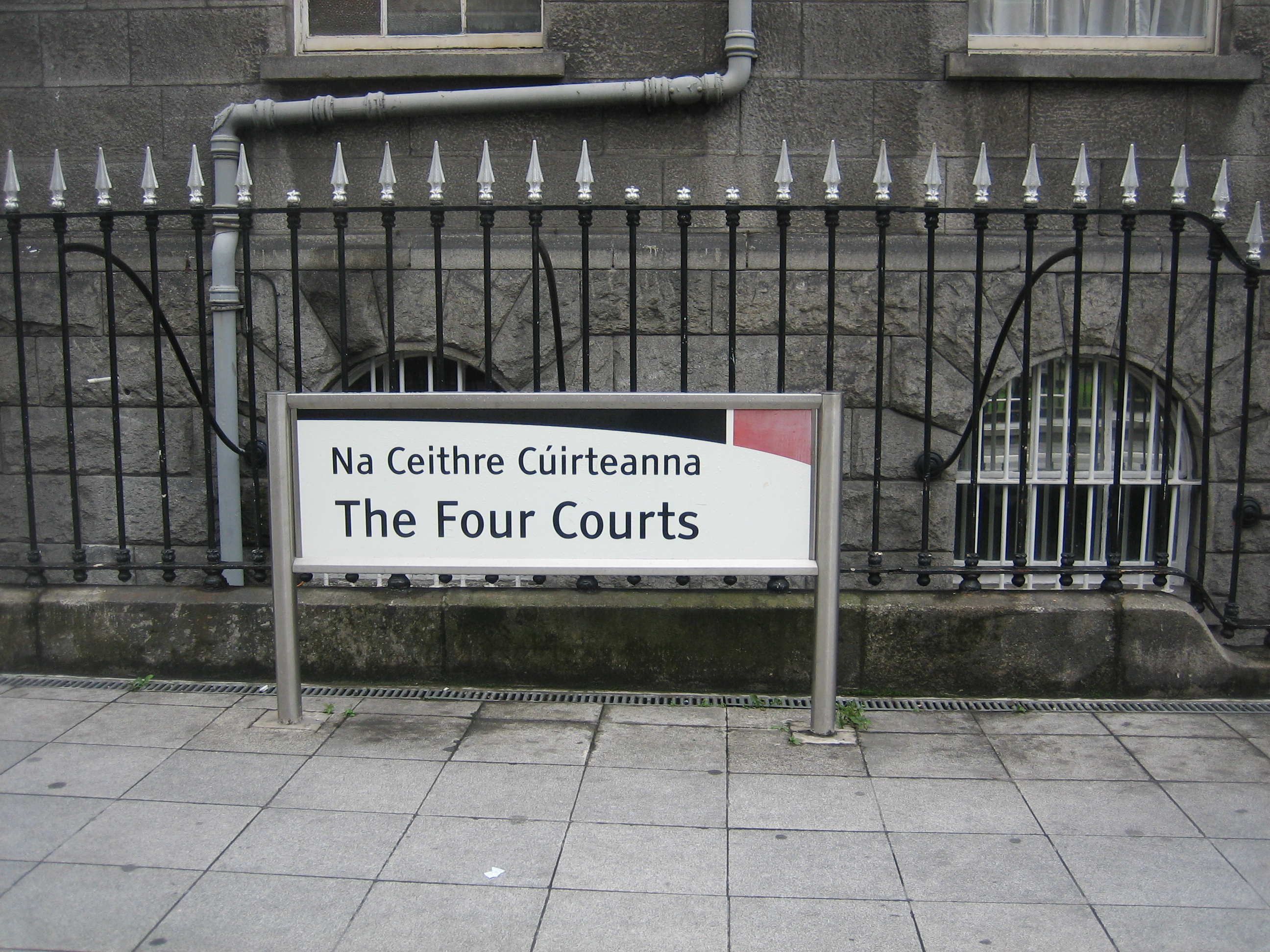
- Platform sign at Four Courts

General information
- Location: Dublin; Ireland
- Coordinates: 53°20′49″N 6°16′24″W
- Owner: Transport Infrastructure Ireland
- Operator: Luas
- Line: Red
- Platforms: 2

Construction
- Structure type: At-grade

Other information
- Fare zone: Central

History
- Opened: 26 September 2004; 21 years ago

Services
Preceding station	Luas	Following station
Smithfield towards Saggart or Tallaght	Red Line	Jervis towards The Point or Connolly
Location
- Location within Central Dublin

Four Courts (Irish: Na Ceithre Cúirteanna) is a stop on the Luas light-rail tram system in Dublin, Ireland. It opened in 2004 as a stop on the Red Line. The Red Line runs east to west along Chancery Street through the city centre, and the Four Courts stop is located to on a section of road closed completely to other traffic, immediately behind the Four Courts, the home of the Court of Appeal, High Court, and Supreme Court of Ireland. It also provides access to Wood Quay and the offices of Dublin City Council. It has two edge platforms integrated into the pavement. The stop connects with a number of Dublin Bus routes.
