= Museum Luas stop =

Tram stop in Dublin, Ireland

Museum Ard-Mhúsaem
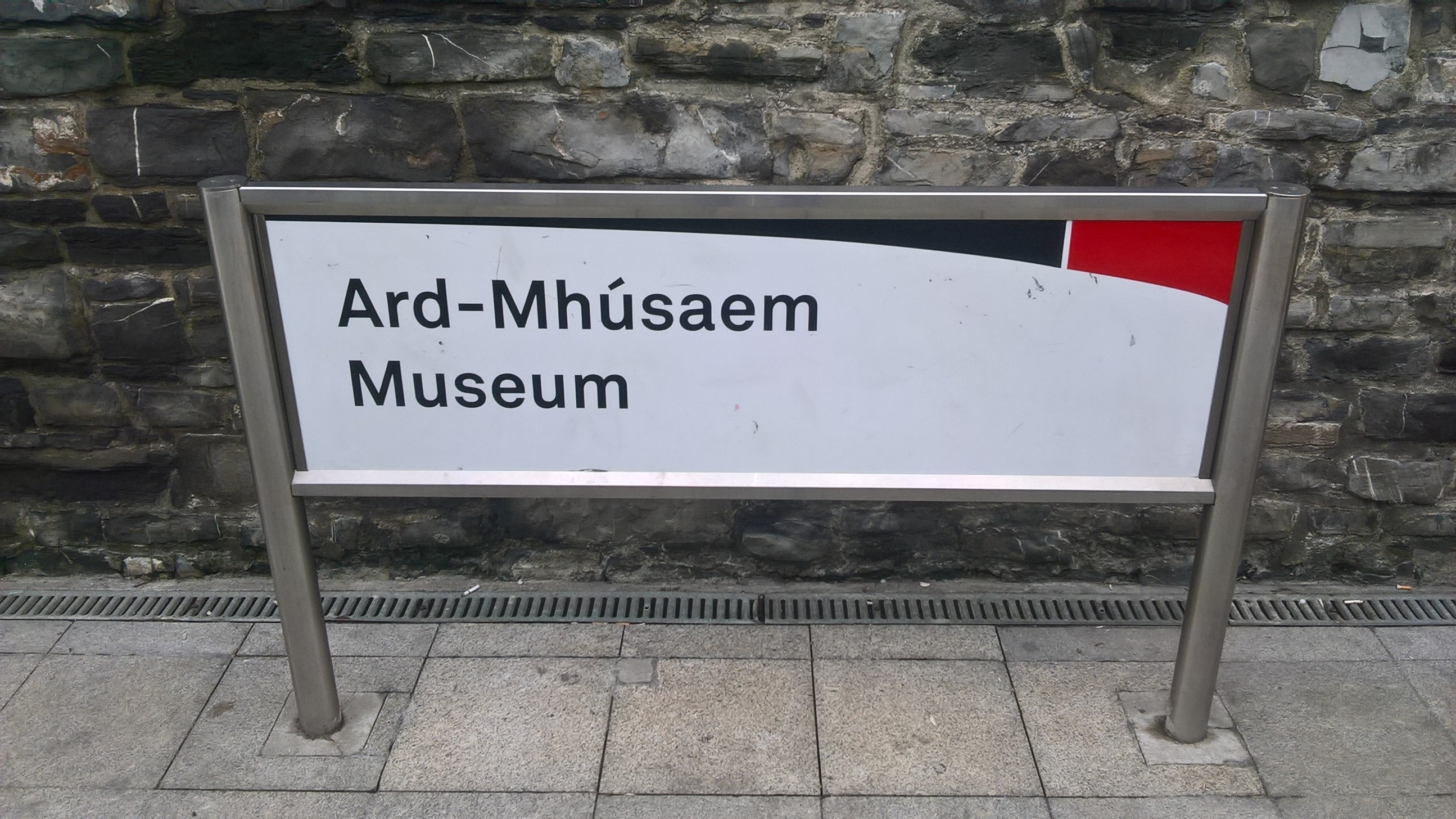
- Platform sign at Museum

General information
- Location: Dublin; Ireland
- Coordinates: 53°20′52″N 6°17′12″W
- Owner: Transdev
- Operator: Luas
- Line: Red
- Platforms: 2

Construction
- Structure type: At-grade

Other information
- Fare zone: Central

History
- Opened: 26 September 2004; 21 years ago

Services
| Preceding station | Luas | Following station |
|---|---|---|
| Heuston towards Saggart or Tallaght | Red Line | Smithfield towards The Point or Connolly |
Location
- Location within Central Dublin

Museum (Irish: Ard-Mhúsaem) is a stop on the Luas light-rail tram system in Dublin, Ireland. It opened in 2004 as a stop on the Red Line. The stop is located between Croppies' Acre (a small memorial park) and the National Museum of Ireland – Decorative Arts and History. It also provides access to the Arbour Hill Prison. It has two edge platforms. Northbound trams leave the stop and travel east through the streets of Dublin city centre to Connolly or The Point. Southbound trams leave the stop and turn left, crossing the River Liffey on Seán Heuston Bridge, before calling at Heuston on their way to Tallaght or Saggart.
