= Abbey Street =

Street in central Dublin, Ireland

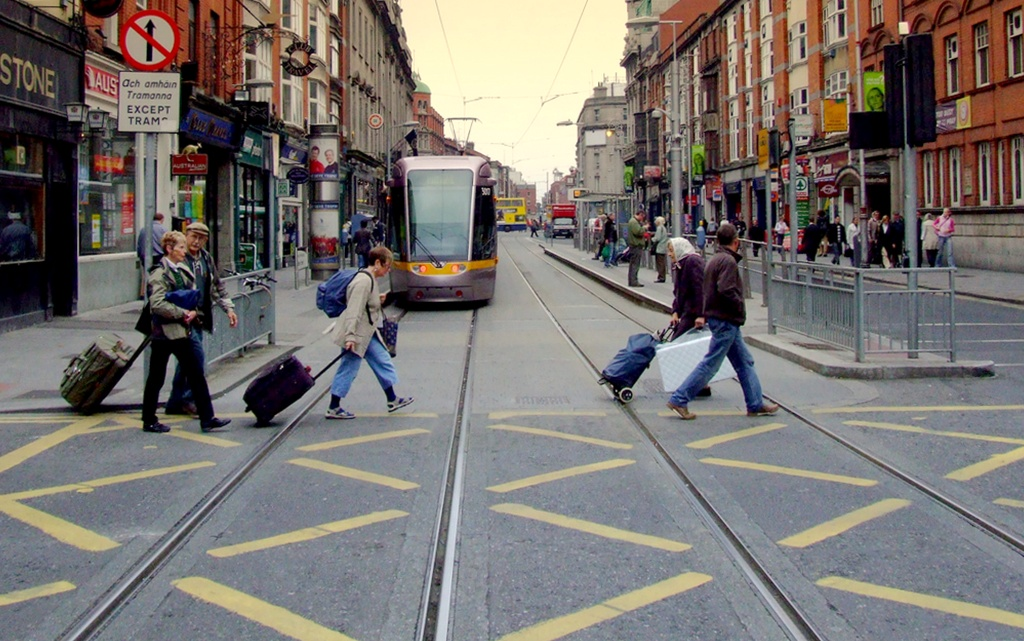

- Location within Central Dublin
- Native name: Sráid na Mainistreach (Irish)
- Namesake: St. Mary's Abbey
- Length: ca. 1 km
- Width: variable, 12–19 metres (39–62 ft)
- Postal code: D01
- Coordinates: 53°20′53″N 6°15′44″W
- west end: Capel Street
- east end: Beresford Place

Other
- Known for: Abbey Theatre, The Academy

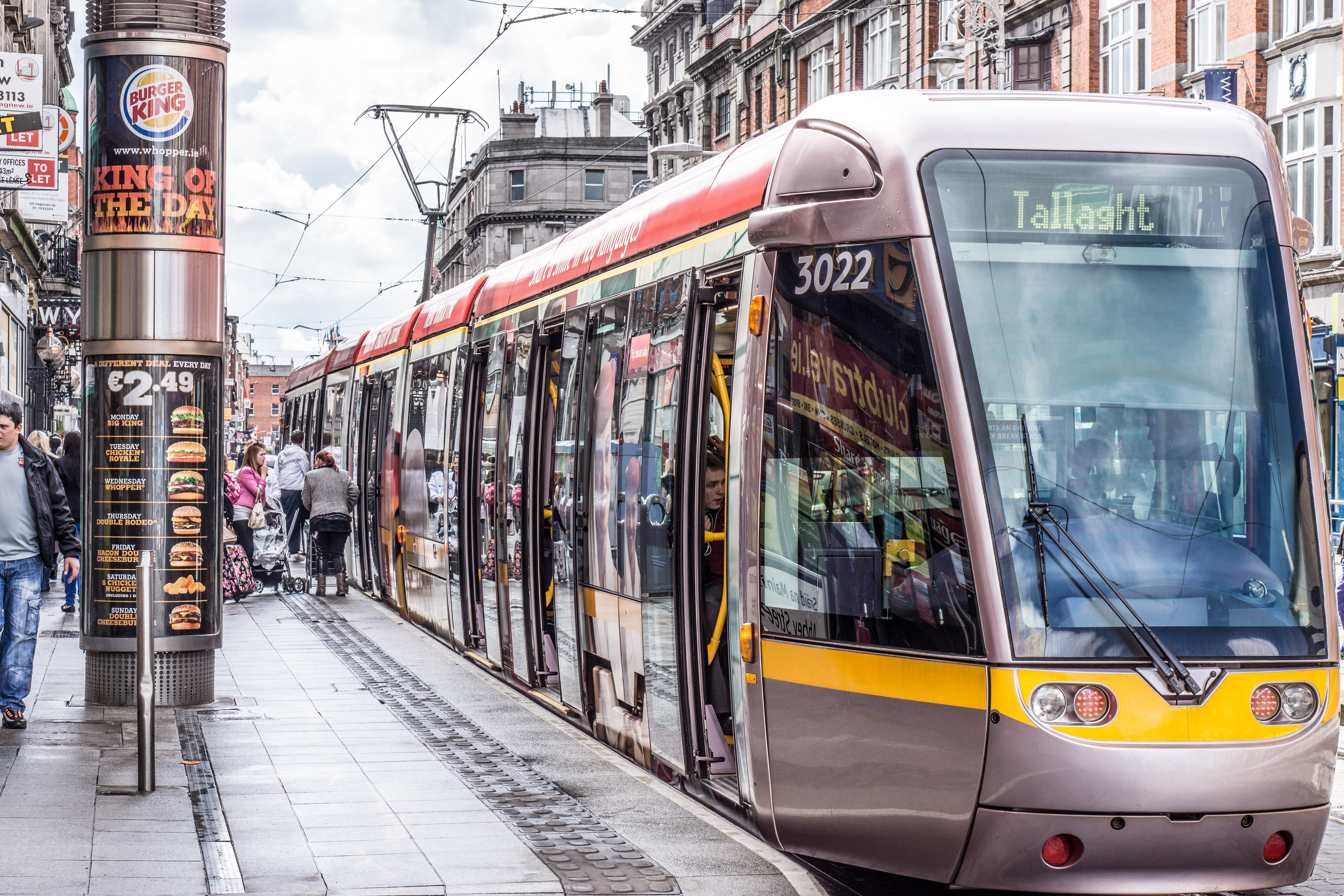
Luas tram stop at Abbey Street

Abbey Street (Irish: Sráid na Mainistreach) is a major street, located on the Northside of Dublin city centre, running from the Customs House and Beresford Place in the east to Capel Street in the west, where it continues as Mary's Abbey. The street is served by two Luas light rail stops, one at Jervis Street and Abbey Street Luas stop near O'Connell Street. About 1 km in length, it is divided into Abbey Street Upper (west end), Abbey Street Middle and Abbey Street Lower (east end). Abbey Street Old is a laneway to the rear of the buildings on the south side of Abbey Street Lower.

== History ==
Abbey Street was named after the former St Mary's Abbey, which was located in the area from 1139 until 1539. The street first appeared on maps of Dublin in 1728. On John Rocque's 1756 map, the street is divided into Great Abbey Street and Little Abbey Street.

== Notable addresses ==
The remnants of St Mary's Abbey are accessible on Meetinghouse Lane, off Mary's Abbey.

The National Theatre of Ireland, the Abbey Theatre is located on Abbey Street Lower, and its building also incorporates the basement Peacock Theatre. The Royal Hibernian Academy building used to be located in Abbey Street Lower but was destroyed in 1916. In 1900, Maud Gonne founded Inghinidhe na hÉireann (The Daughters of Erin) at 32 Abbey Street Lower.

The former headquarters of Independent News & Media and its Irish Independent newspaper, 'Independent House,' is located on Abbey Street Middle, although the offices have since moved to nearby Talbot Street. Independent House had previously been the offices of The Nation, a nationalist newspaper.

George Frideric Handel stayed in Abbey Street while in Dublin producing Messiah at Fishamble Street in 1742. In 1785, James Napper Tandy stayed at 180 Abbey Street before eventually fleeing to the United States.

=== Retail & services ===
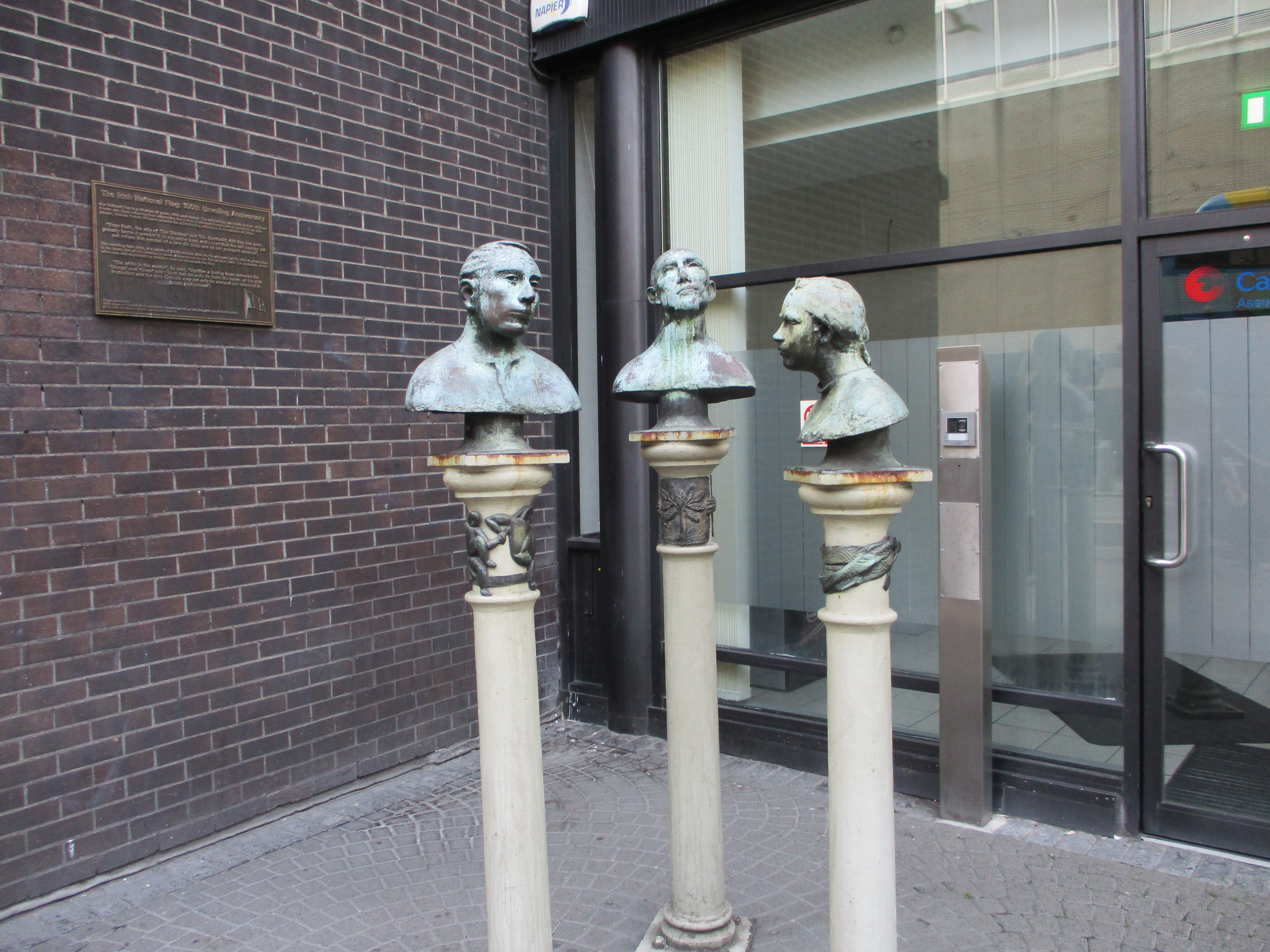
Talking Heads sculpture near the National Lottery offices on Abbey Street Lower

Notable establishments include:

- Arnotts department store, although its main entrance is on Henry Street
- The Jervis shopping centre, as of 2008, the largest shopping centre in Dublin city centre
- The Academy music venue, formerly Spirit nightclub, 57 Abbey Street Middle
- Eason book and stationery shop (its main entrance is on O'Connell Street)
- Abbey Street Methodist Church where Australian politician, William McMillan lived in his youth.
- The Irish Life Centre, a prominent mixed-use complex on Abbey Street Lower, including office space, parts occupied by Irish Life itself
- The National Lottery offices are part of the Irish Life Centre
- Wynn's Hotel, Dublin, a period hotel which has featured in a number of important Irish literary works.

== See also ==
- List of streets and squares in Dublin
