= Smithfield Luas stop =

Tram stop in Dublin, Ireland

Smithfield Margadh na Feirme
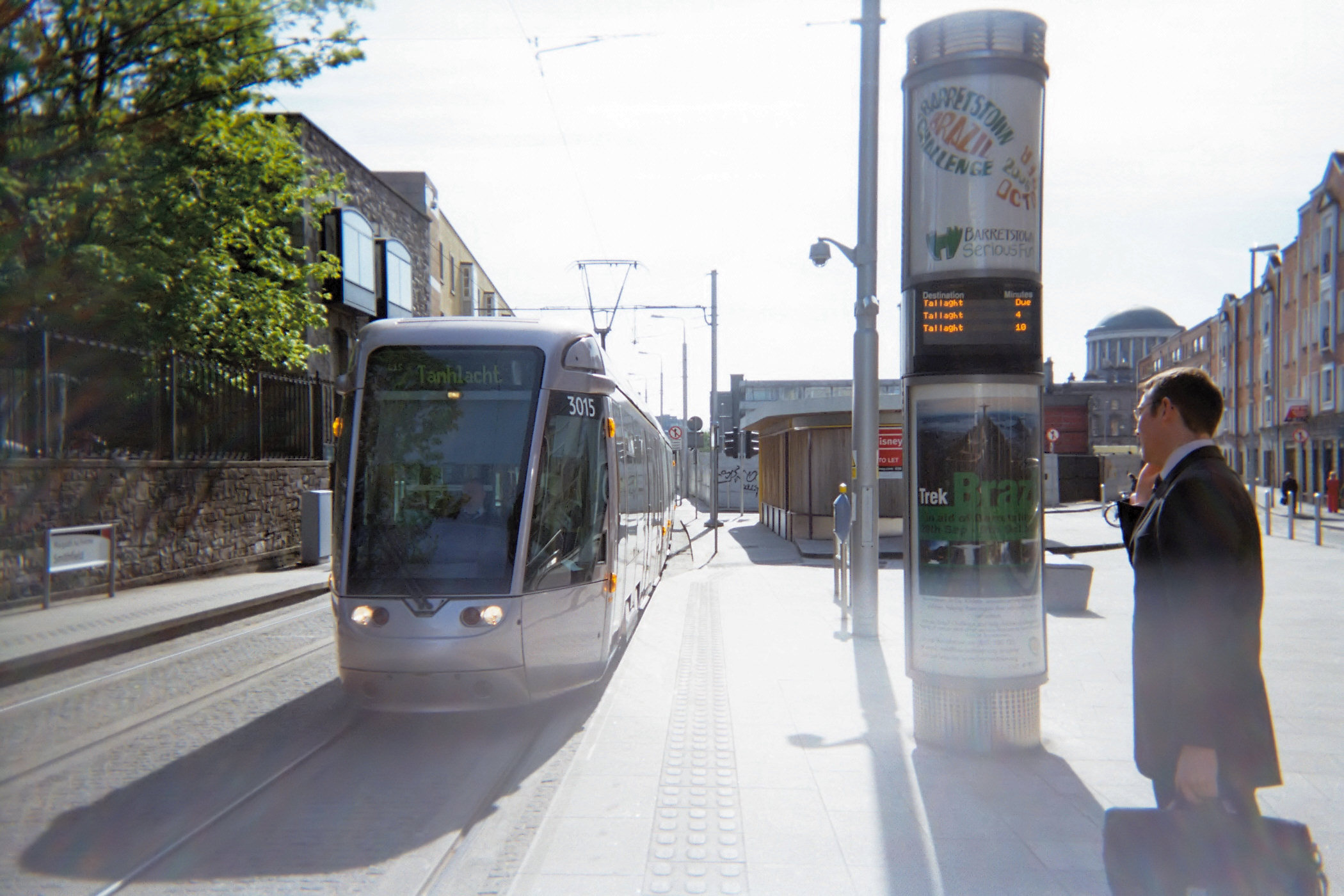
- A tram at the southbound platform

General information
- Location: Dublin; Ireland
- Coordinates: 53°20′50″N 6°16′40″W
- Owner: Transport Infrastructure Ireland
- Operator: Luas
- Line: Red
- Platforms: 2

Construction
- Structure type: At-grade

Other information
- Fare zone: Central

History
- Opened: 26 September 2004; 21 years ago

Services
Preceding station	Luas	Following station
Museum towards Saggart or Tallaght	Red Line	Four Courts towards The Point or Connolly
Location
- Location within Central Dublin

Smithfield (Irish: Margadh na Feirme) is a stop on the Luas light-rail tram system in Dublin, Ireland. It opened in 2004 as a stop on the Red Line. The Red Line runs east to west along Phoenix Street, and the Four Courts stop is located to on a section of road closed completely to other traffic, to the side of Smithfield plaza, a large open square previously used as a market. It also provides access to the Old Jameson Distillery and Light House Cinema. It has two edge platforms integrated into the pavement. The stop connects with a number of Dublin Bus routes.
