= Dominick Luas stop =

Tram stop in Dublin, Ireland

Dominick Doiminic
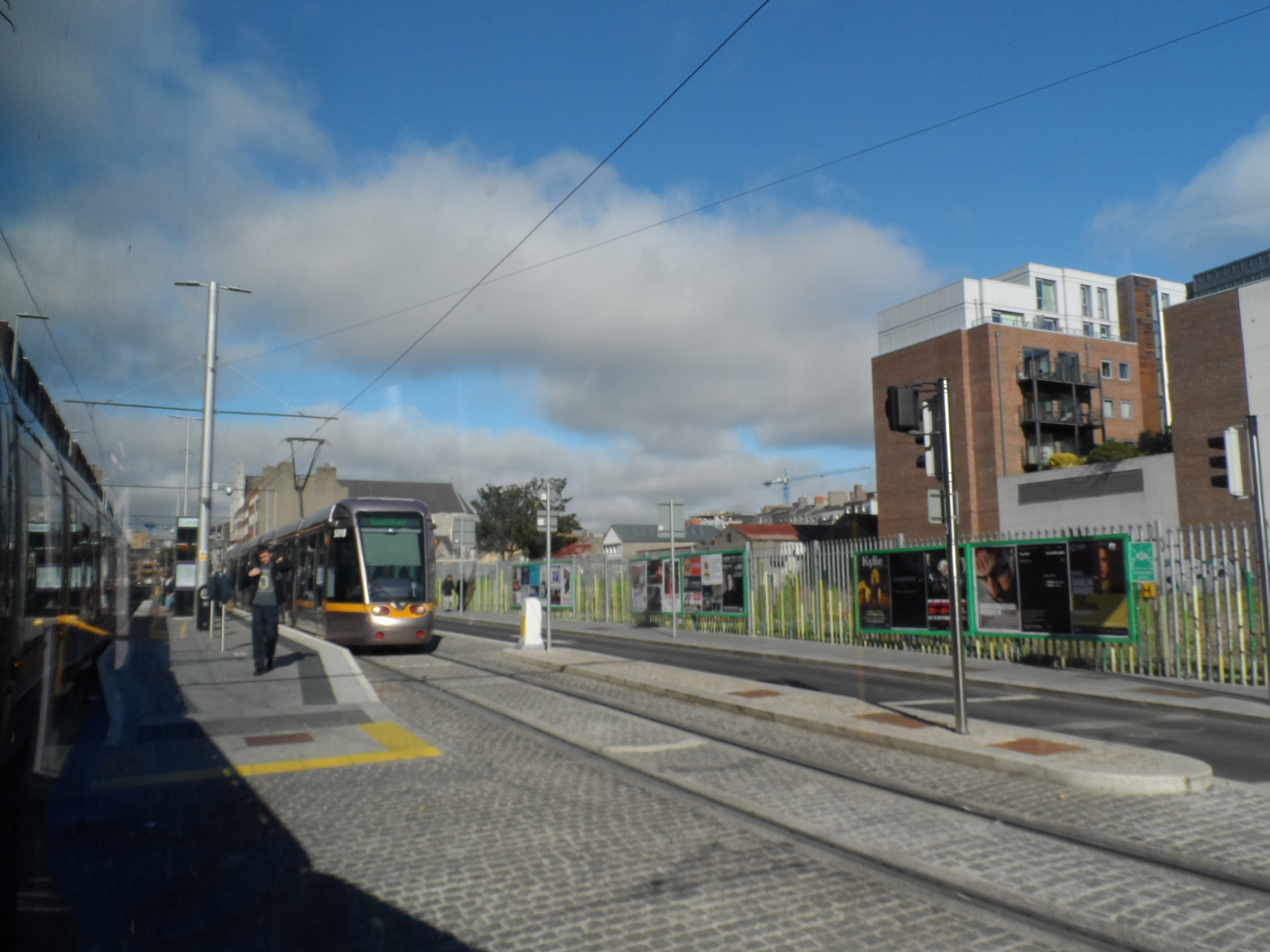
- A tram at Dominick

General information
- Location: Dominick Street, Dublin; Dublin; Ireland
- Coordinates: 53°21′05″N 6°15′56″W
- Owner: Transdev
- Operator: Luas
- Line: Green
- Platforms: 2

Construction
- Structure type: At-grade

Other information
- Fare zone: Central

Key dates
- 9 December 2017: Stop opened

Services
Preceding station	Luas	Following station
Broadstone — University towards Broombridge	Green Line	Parnell towards Sandyford or Brides Glen
Broadstone — University towards Broombridge	Green Line	O'Connell Upper One-way operation
Location
- Location within Central Dublin

Dominick (Irish: Doiminic) is a stop on the Luas light-rail tram system in Dublin, Ireland. It opened in 2017 as a stop on Luas Cross City, an extension of the Green Line through the city centre from St. Stephen's Green to Broombridge. It is located on Dominick Street Lower and provides access to Rotunda Hospital, 14 Henrietta Street, and the Dublin Institute of Technology Bolton Street Campus. It is one of only three Luas stops with an island platform. To the south of the stop, trams turn left onto Parnell street on their way into the city centre. To the north, they continue along Dominick street towards Broadstone, on their way to Broombridge.

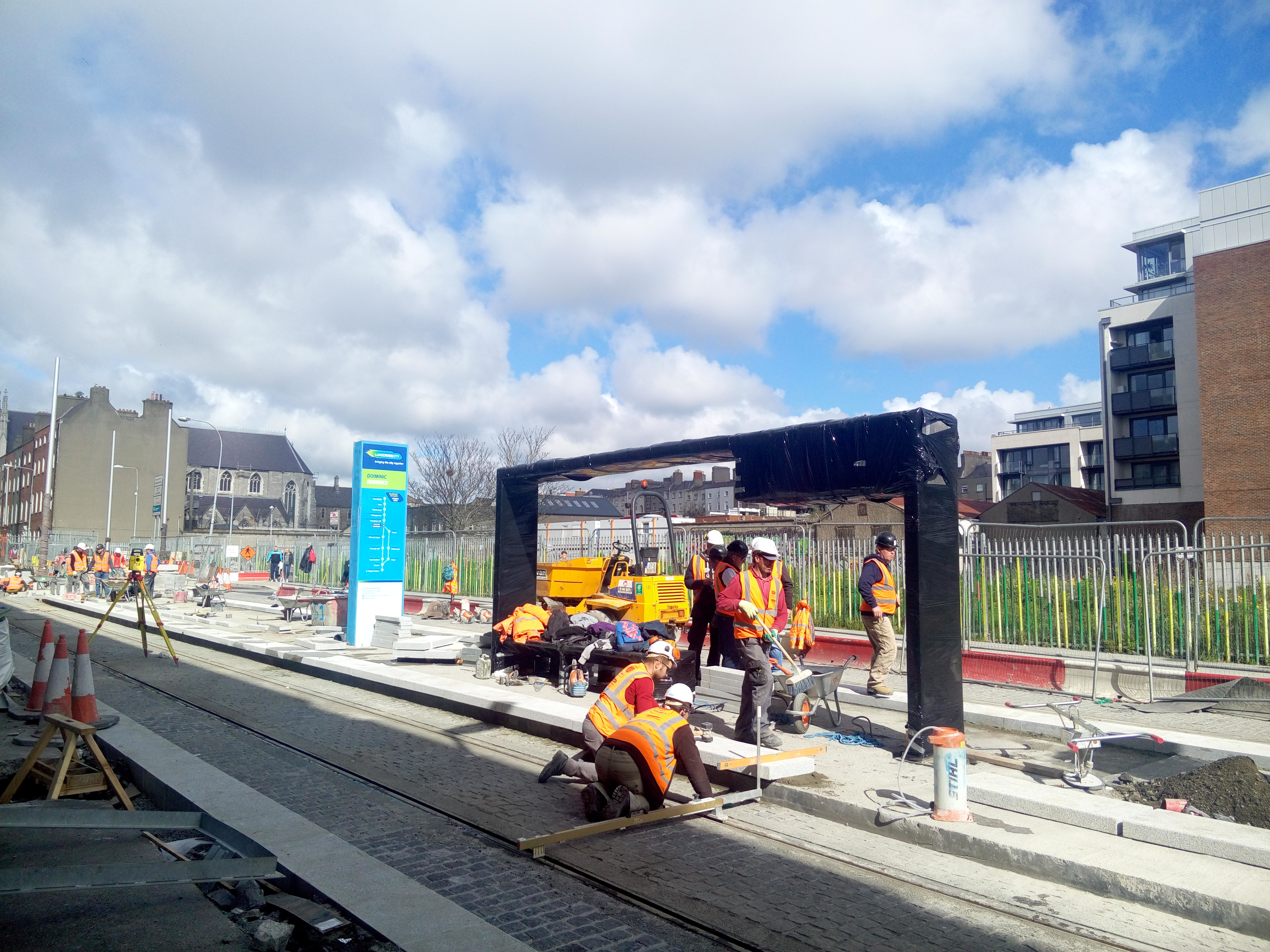
The stop under construction in 2017
