= O'Connell Upper Luas stop =

Tram stop in Dublin, Ireland

O'Connell Upper Ó Conaill Uachtarach
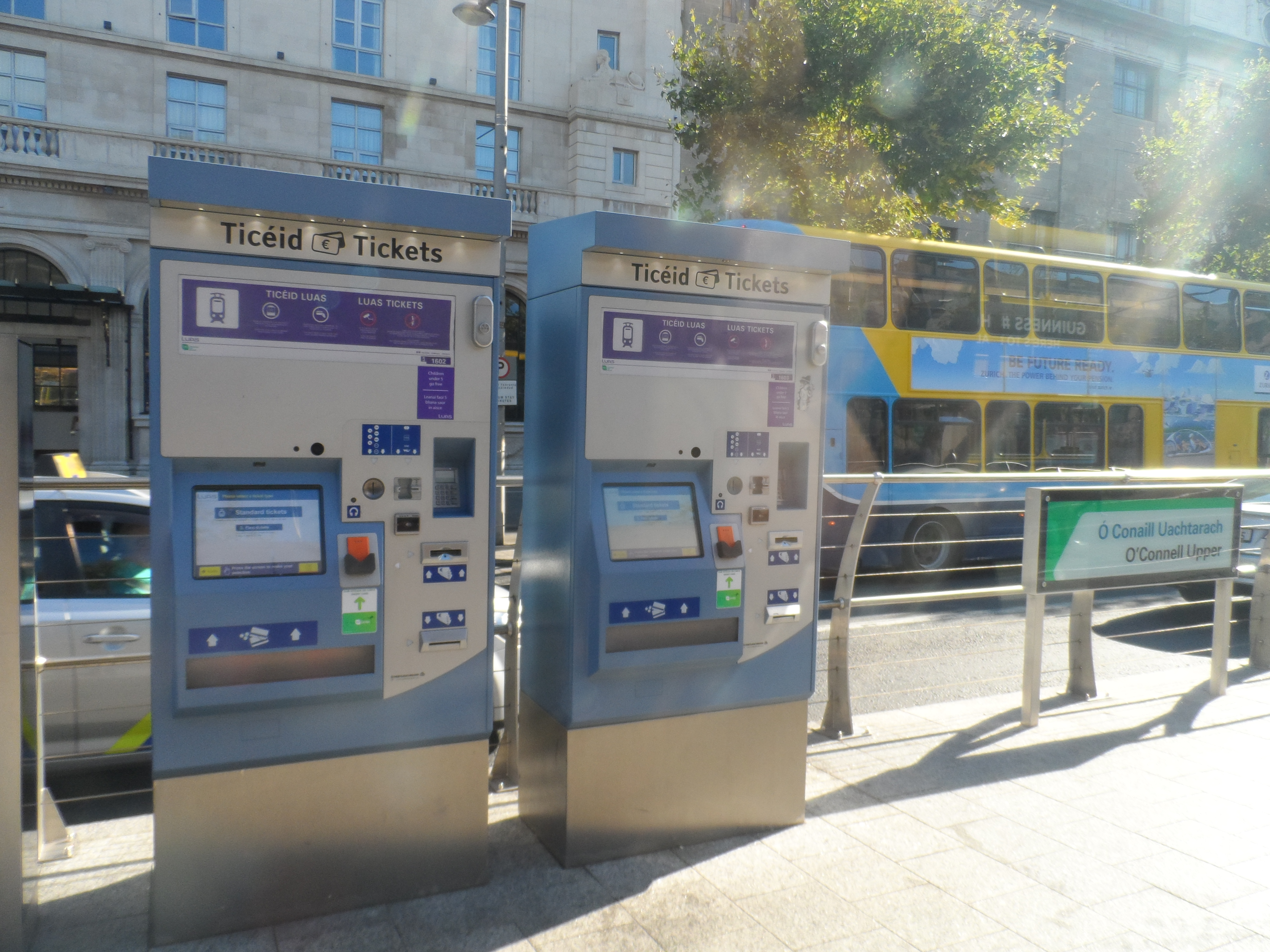
- The ticket machines at O'Connell Upper

General information
- Location: O'Connell Street, Dublin; Dublin; Ireland
- Coordinates: 53°21′06″N 6°15′40″W
- Owner: Transdev
- Operator: Luas
- Line: Green
- Platforms: 1

Construction
- Structure type: At-grade

Other information
- Fare zone: Central

Key dates
- 9 December 2017: Stop opened

Services
| Preceding station | Luas | Following station |
|---|---|---|
| Dominick towards Broombridge | Green Line | O'Connell - GPO One-way operation |
| Parnell Terminus | Green Line | O'Connell - GPO One-way operation |
Location
- Location within Central Dublin

O'Connell Upper (Irish: Ó Conaill Uachtarach) is a stop on the Luas light-rail tram system in Dublin, Ireland. It opened in 2017 as a stop on Luas Cross City, an extension of the Green Line through the city centre from St. Stephen's Green to Broombridge. It is located on O'Connell Street, and provides access to the Savoy Cinema.

== Location ==
O'Connell Upper's single platform is located to the east of the tracks, integrated into the central reservation of O'Connell Street. It is a stop on the one-way system at the centre of the green line. Beyond the tracks there is a junction where trams either turn left, reuniting with the southbound track and continuing to Broombridge or right, turning to Parnell.
