= Marlborough Street, Dublin =

Street in Dublin 1, Ireland

Marlborough Street
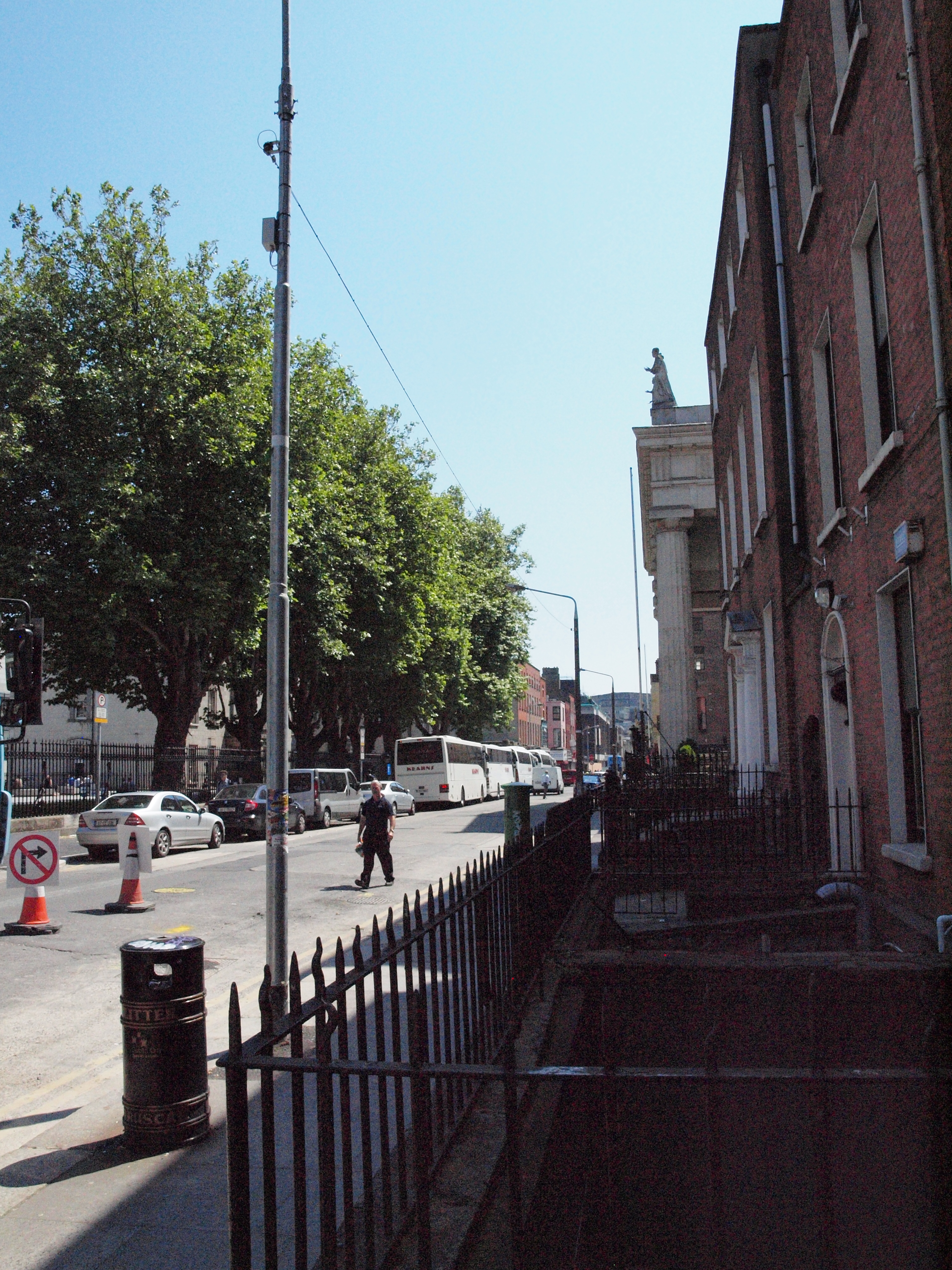

- Location within Central Dublin
- Native name: Sráid Mhaoilbhríde (Irish)
- Former name: Tyrone Street
- Namesake: John Churchill, 1st Duke of Marlborough
- Length: 610 m (2,000 ft)
- Width: 12.5 metres (41 ft)
- Location: Dublin, Ireland
- Postal code: D01
- Coordinates: 53°20′58″N 6°15′28″W
- north end: Parnell Street
- Major junctions: Mecklenburgh Street
- south end: Eden Quay, Rosie Hackett Bridge

Other
- Known for: St Mary's Pro-Cathedral, Department of Education and Youth

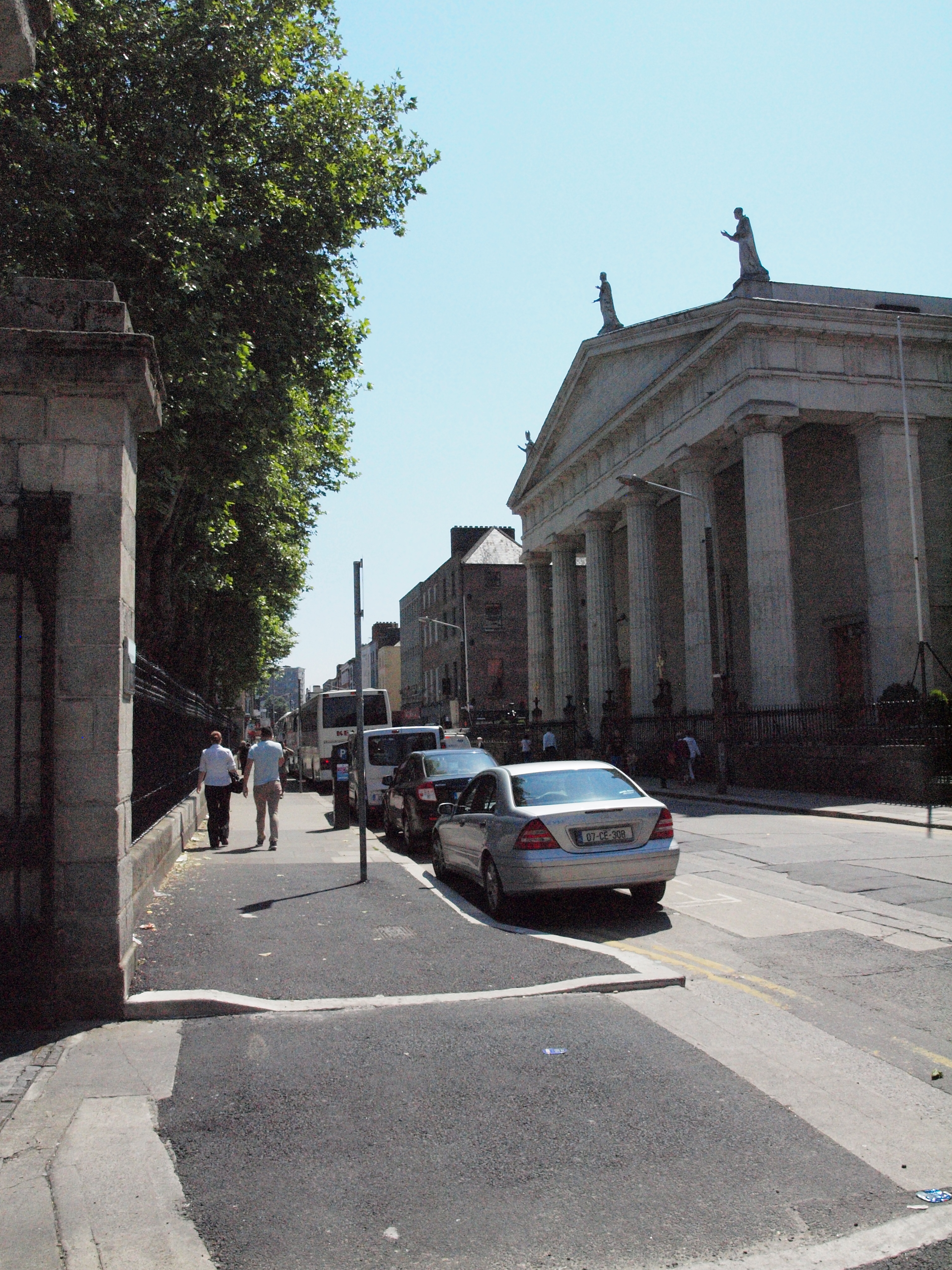
St Mary's Pro-Cathedral

Marlborough Street (Irish: Sráid Mhaoilbhríde) is a street in the city centre of Dublin, Ireland.

== Naming ==
The street was named Great Marlborough Street after the 1st Duke of Marlborough, known for his victory at the Battle of Blenheim during the 18th century. The lower part of the street was at different times called Union Lane, Ferryboat Lane, and Union Street.

== Buildings ==
Among the earliest buildings on the street is the 18th-century Tyrone House, the grounds of which now house the Department of Education and Youth.

One of the principal buildings on this street is St Mary's Pro-Cathedral, designed by John Sweetman, and completed in 1825.

There is also what used to be a depot belonging to the Dublin United Tramways Company. Dublin Bus now use the premises.

Towards the junction with Parnell Street, there is the 1970s 8-storey office block, Telephone House designed by Brian Hogan. 13 tenement buildings with shops were demolished to make way for the development. Far higher than most of the neighbouring buildings, it has been largely seen as having a negative impact on the streetscape, including on the vista down North Great George's Street.

Marlborough Street was the location of the original St. Thomas’s Church which was damaged in 1922.

== Luas ==
Marlborough Luas stop on the street is on the Green Line. Construction started in June 2013, with services beginning on 9 December 2017. Being near the Red line Abbey street stop, it is a key interchange point on the two Luas lines.

== People ==
Notable people to live, or have lived, on the street include:

- Alexander Nimmo, Scottish civil engineer and geologist, who lived at No. 78

== See also ==
- List of streets and squares in Dublin
