= Trinity Luas stop =

Tram stop in Dublin, Ireland

Trinity An Trionóid
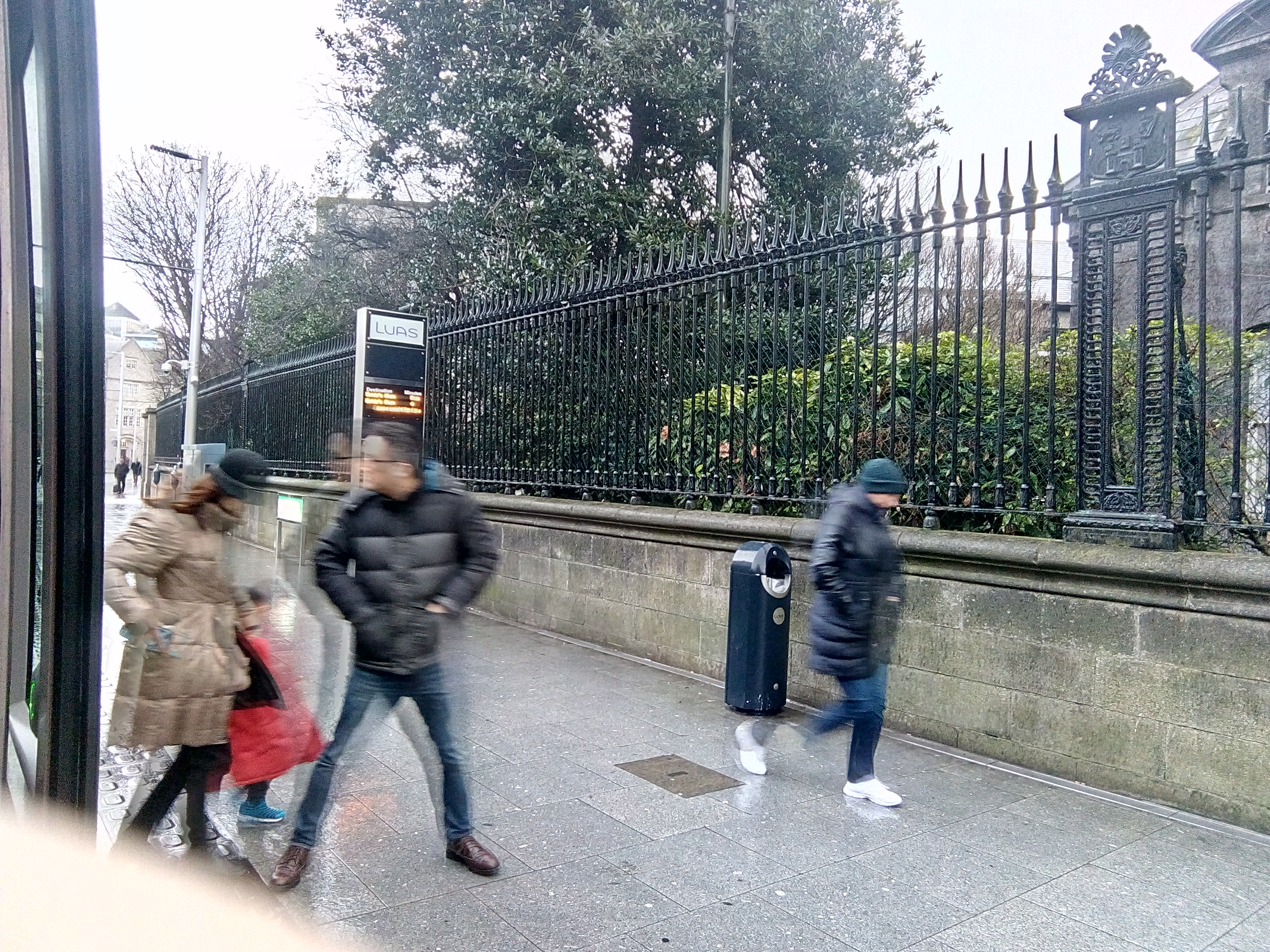
- People alighting at the Trinity Luas stop

General information
- Location: Dublin; Ireland
- Coordinates: 53°20′43″N 6°15′30″W
- Owner: Transdev
- Operator: Luas
- Line: Green
- Platforms: 1

Construction
- Structure type: At-grade

Other information
- Fare zone: Central

Key dates
- 9 December 2017: Stop opened

Services
Preceding station	Luas	Following station
Marlborough One-way operation	Green Line	Dawson towards Sandyford or Brides Glen
Location
- Location within Central Dublin

Trinity (Irish: An Trionóid) is a stop on the Luas light-rail tram system in Dublin, Ireland. It opened in 2017 as a stop on Luas Cross City, an extension of the Green Line through the city centre from St. Stephen's Green to Broombridge. It is located on College Street at the side of Trinity College, Dublin. It also provides access to the Olympia Theatre. It is part of a one-way system and serves trams travelling south. The nearest northbound stop is Westmoreland. To the south of the stop, the two tracks reunite and trams head around College Green on their way to Sandyford or Brides Glen.
