= Westmoreland Luas stop =

Tram stop in Dublin, Ireland

Westmoreland
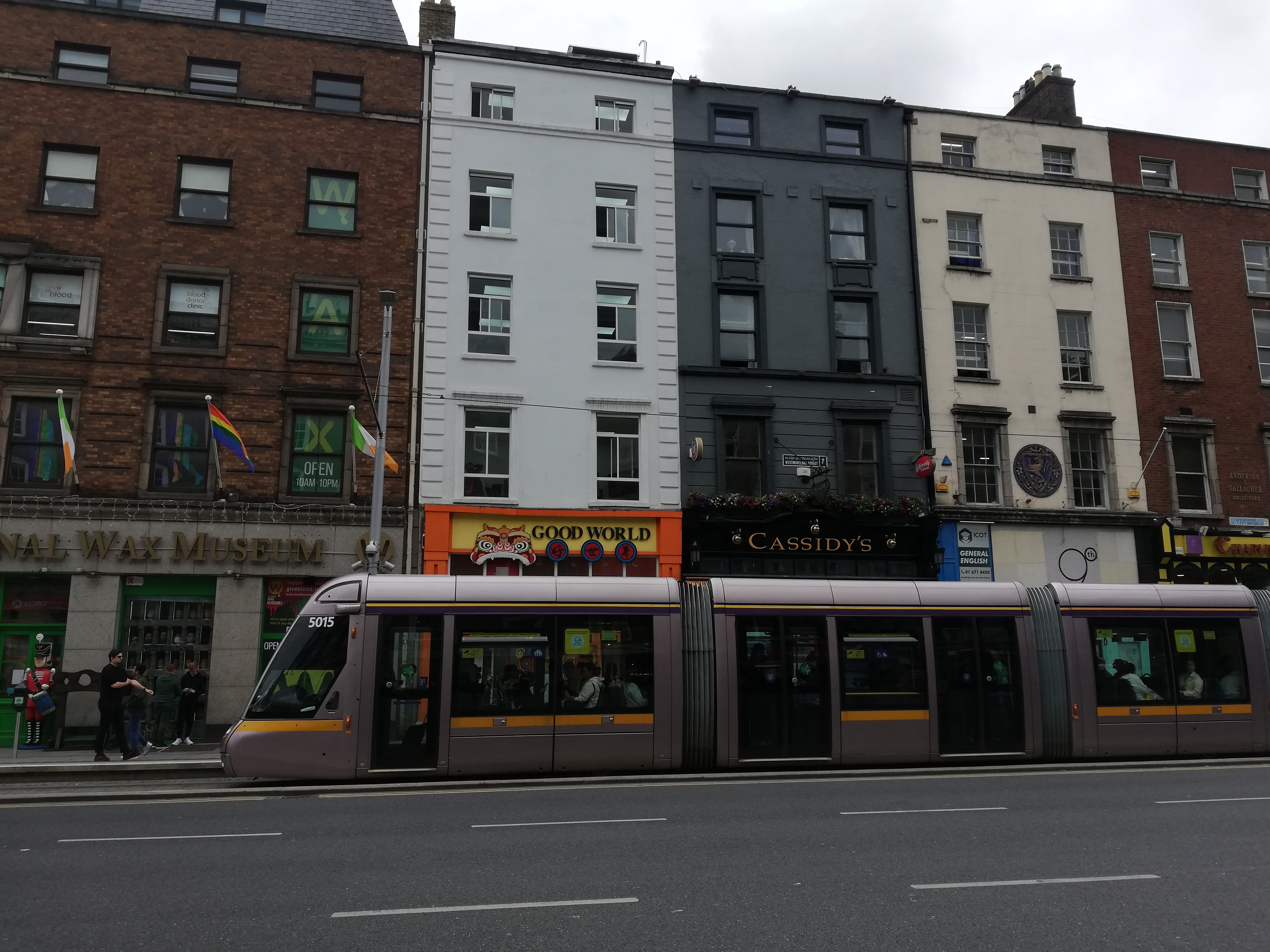

General information
- Location: Westmoreland Street, Dublin; Dublin; Ireland
- Coordinates: 53°20′47″N 6°15′32″W
- Owner: Transdev
- Operator: Luas
- Line: Green
- Platforms: 1

Construction
- Structure type: At-grade

Other information
- Fare zone: Central

Key dates
- 9 December 2017: Stop opened

Services
Preceding station	Luas	Following station
O'Connell - GPO towards Parnell or Broombridge	Green Line	Dawson One-way operation
Location
- Location within Central Dublin

Westmoreland is a stop on the Luas light-rail tram system in Dublin, Ireland. It opened in 2017 as a stop on Luas Cross City, an extension of the Green Line through the city centre from St Stephen's Green to Broombridge. It is located on Westmoreland Street, immediately to the south of O'Connell Bridge. It is part of a one-way system and serves trams travelling north. The nearest southbound stop is Trinity. To the south of the stop, the two tracks reunite and trams head around College Green on their way to Sandyford or Brides Glen.
