= Jervis Luas stop =

Tram stop in Dublin, Ireland

Jervis
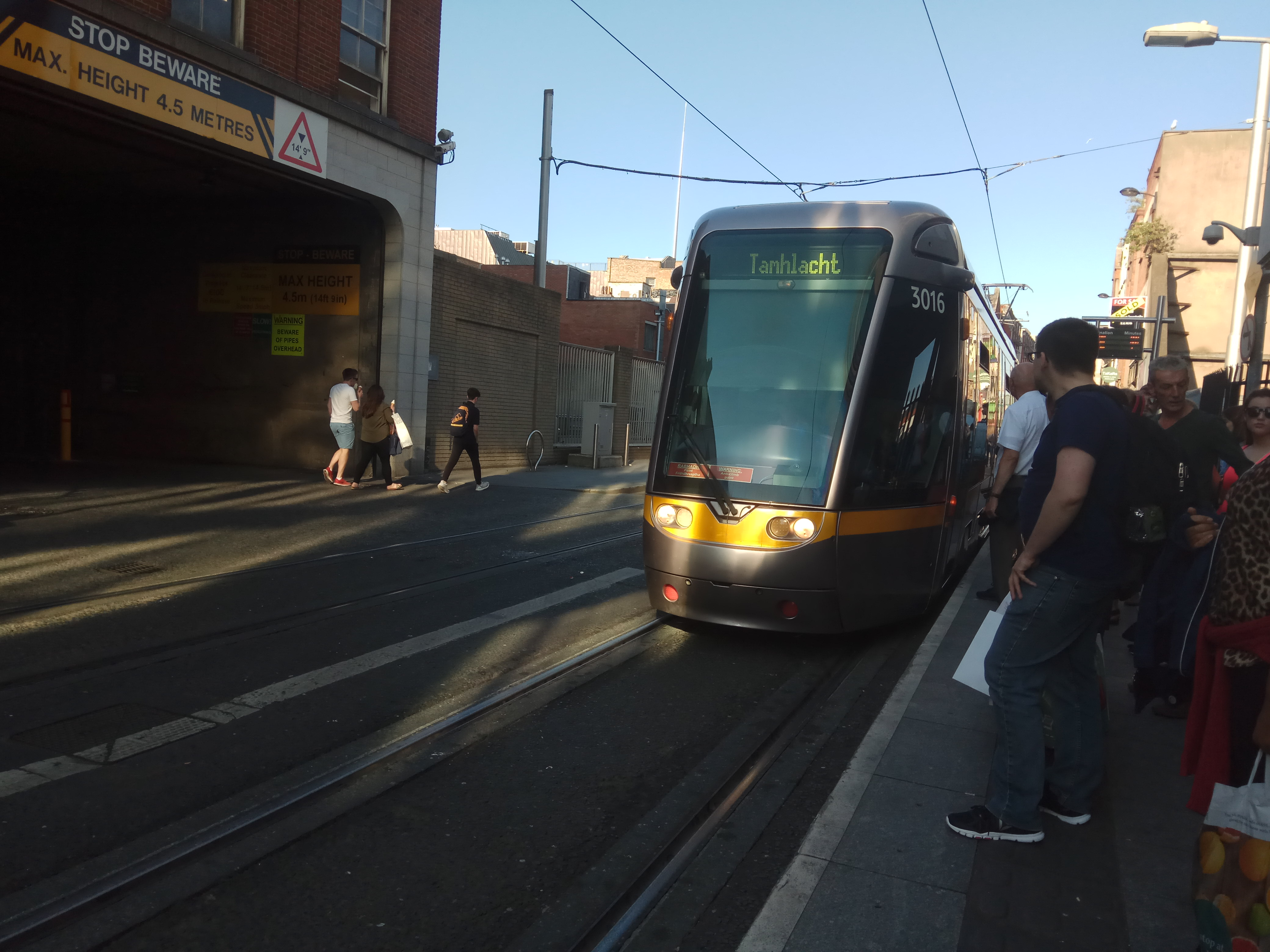
- A Tallaght-bound tram at Jervis. The other platform is out of view to the left of frame.

General information
- Location: Upper Abbey Street; Dublin; Ireland
- Coordinates: 53°20′52″N 6°15′55″W
- Owner: Transport Infrastructure Ireland
- Operator: Transdev (as Luas)
- Line: Red
- Platforms: 2

Construction
- Structure type: At-grade

Other information
- Fare zone: Central

History
- Opened: 26 September 2004; 21 years ago
Location
- Location within Central Dublin

Jervis is a stop on the Luas light-rail tram system in Dublin, Ireland. It opened in 2004 as a stop on the Red Line.

== Location and access ==
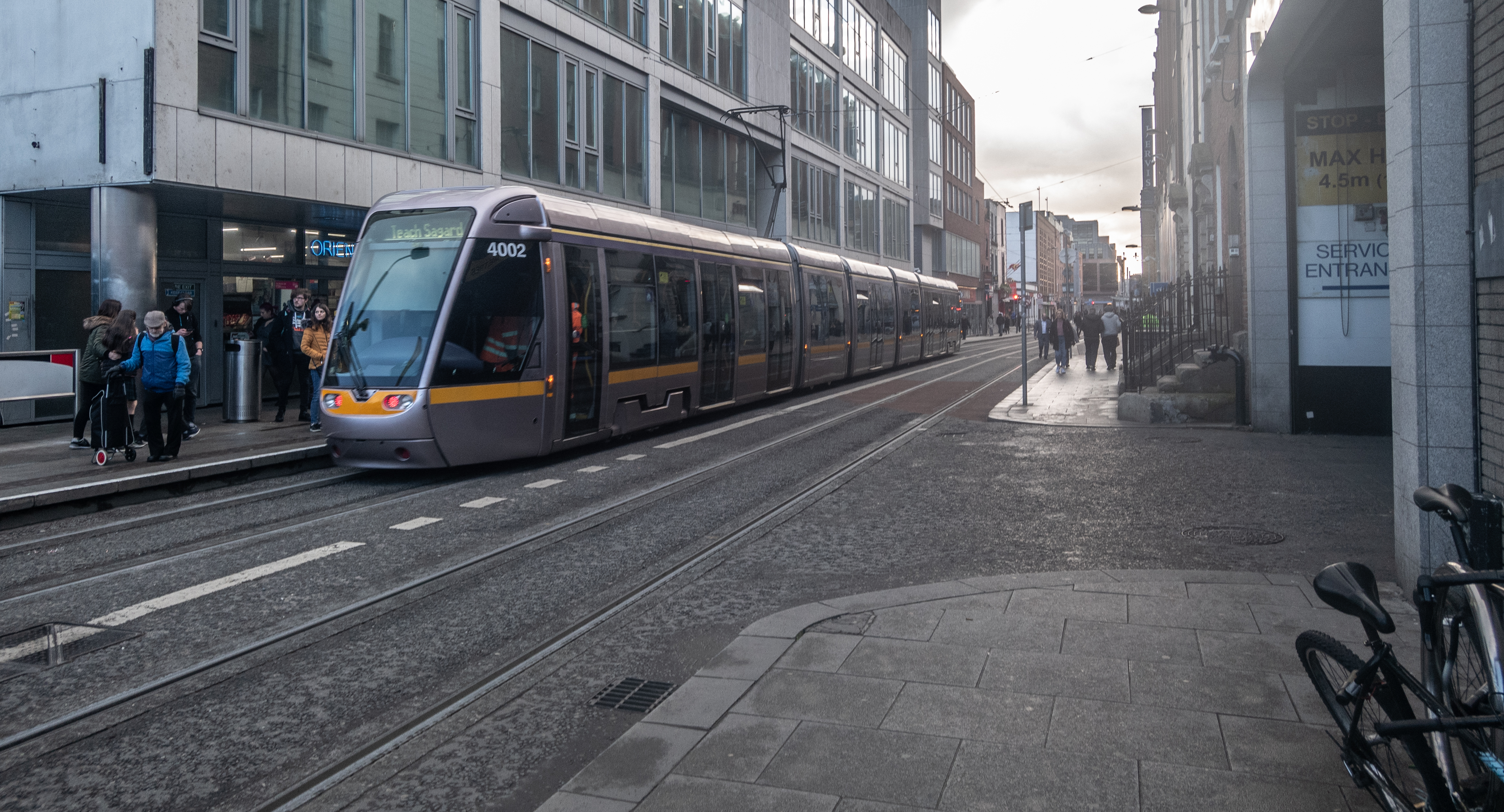
A Luas on the westbound platform bound for Saggart

The Red Line runs east to west along Abbey Street through the city centre, and the Jervis stop is located to the east of Jervis Street, in front of the Jervis Shopping Centre. It also provides access to the Temple Bar and St. Mary's Abbey. It has two edge platforms integrated into the pavement. The platforms are staggered - a rarity for Luas stops - to prevent congestion. The stop connects with a number of Dublin Bus routes including the following: C1 | C2 | C3 | C4 | C5 | C6 | G1 | G2 | 26 | 83 | 145.

== Services ==
Trams stop at the stop coming from either end every 2-10 minutes.

Preceding station	Luas	Following station
Four Courts towards Saggart or Tallaght	Red Line	Abbey Street towards The Point or Connolly

== Incidents ==
On 7 April 2014, a car collided with a Luas tram at the junction of Jervis Street and Abbey Street, which caused the car to fatally strike a 35-year-old pedestrian from Dublin, who was pronounced dead at the scene.
