= Dunne v Minister for the Environment, Heritage and Local Government =

Irish Supreme Court case

Dunne -v- Minister for the Environment & ors
- Coat of arms of Ireland
- Court: Supreme Court of Ireland
- Full case name: Dunne -v- Minister for the Environment & ors
- Decided: 6 December 2007
- Citation: [2007] IESC 60

Court membership
- Judges sitting: Murray C.J., Denham J., Hardiman J., Geoghegan J., Kearns J.

Case opinions
- If, in the special circumstances of a case, the interests of justice require that it should do so, the Supreme Court has discretion to depart from the normal rule that costs follow the event and are awarded against the unsuccessful party.
- Decision by: Murray C.J.

Keywords
- Order as to Costs; EU Law; Costs follow event; Constitution; Constitution of Ireland

Dunne v Minister for the Environment, Heritage and Local Government, [2007] IESC 60; [2008] 2 IR 775, is an Irish Supreme Court case concerning costs in public interest challenges. The Court allowed an appeal against the order for costs made in the High Court and also granted costs against the appellant for the unsuccessful appeal to the Supreme Court.

== Background ==
This case concerned the costs in relation to an action taken in relation to the Carrickmines works on the southeastern route of the M50 motorway in Dublin, Ireland. It had been argued that Section 8 of the National Monuments (Amendment) Act 2004, which introduced a special provision in relation to completing the M50 at Carrickmines Castle, was unconstitutional and that the National Monuments (Amendment) Act 2004, contravened EU Directives.

=== Decision of the High Court ===
Although Mr. Dunne lost his case in the High Court, the Court awarded him costs notwithstanding the normal rule that the losing party should pay the costs of the proceedings.

In the High Court, Laffoy J held that the court's discretion to depart from the normal rule was governed by two principles:

1. that the person bringing the case was "acting in the public interest in a matter which involved no private personal advantage"; and
2. that the issues raised by the proceedings are of "sufficient general public importance to warrant an order for costs being made" in his/her favour.

Mr. Dunne appealed the decision of the High Court to the Supreme Court. The Supreme Court unanimously upheld the judgment of the High Court and dismissed the appeal. The Minister for the Environment also appealed against the High Court Order awarding costs of the High Court proceedings to Mr. Dunne. Mr. Dunne in contrast sought to uphold the order of the High Court awarding him costs and, as regards the appeal to Supreme Court, requested that the Supreme Court exercise its discretion by either (1) "awarding him his costs of the appeal" or; (2) "making no [o]rder as to costs".

== Holding of the Supreme Court ==
=== Costs in relation to the High Court Action ===
This costs order made by the High Court was overruled by the Supreme Court. It was the view of the Supreme Court that, in the context of this case, the ordinary rule should apply to the costs of the High Court proceedings. As a result, costs should follow the event and that costs are awarded against the unsuccessful party. The Supreme Court concluded that High Court had given “undue weight” to the two principles referred to above so as to treat them as “determining” factors. The Supreme Court noted that the rule that costs follow the event had an “obvious equitable basis” although it did also note the Supreme Court's discretionary jurisdiction to depart from this rule if, “in the special circumstances of a case, the interests of justice require that it should do so.” The Supreme Court declined to list what those special circumstances might be and instead noted that they should be determined on a case-by-case basis.

The Court therefore allowed the appeal against the order for costs made in favour of the Mr. Dunne in the High Court. It substituted an order awarding the costs of the High Court proceedings to the Minister for the Environment (on behalf of the Irish State).

=== Costs of the Appeal to the Supreme Court ===
The Supreme Court found that costs should follow the event where there are no circumstances arising in the appeal that would justify departure from the normal rule. As the Court felt there was no such circumstances in this case, Mr. Dunne was ordered to pay the costs associated with his unsuccessful appeal.

As a result of the decision of the Supreme Court in this case, Mr Dunne faced costs of approximately EUR500,000.

== See also ==
- Supreme Court of Ireland
- Carrickmines
- M50 motorway (Ireland)
- Carrickmines Castle
- High Court (Ireland)
