= Dingle Glen =

Wooded glen in Dún Laoghaire–Rathdown, Ireland

- An Fhothair
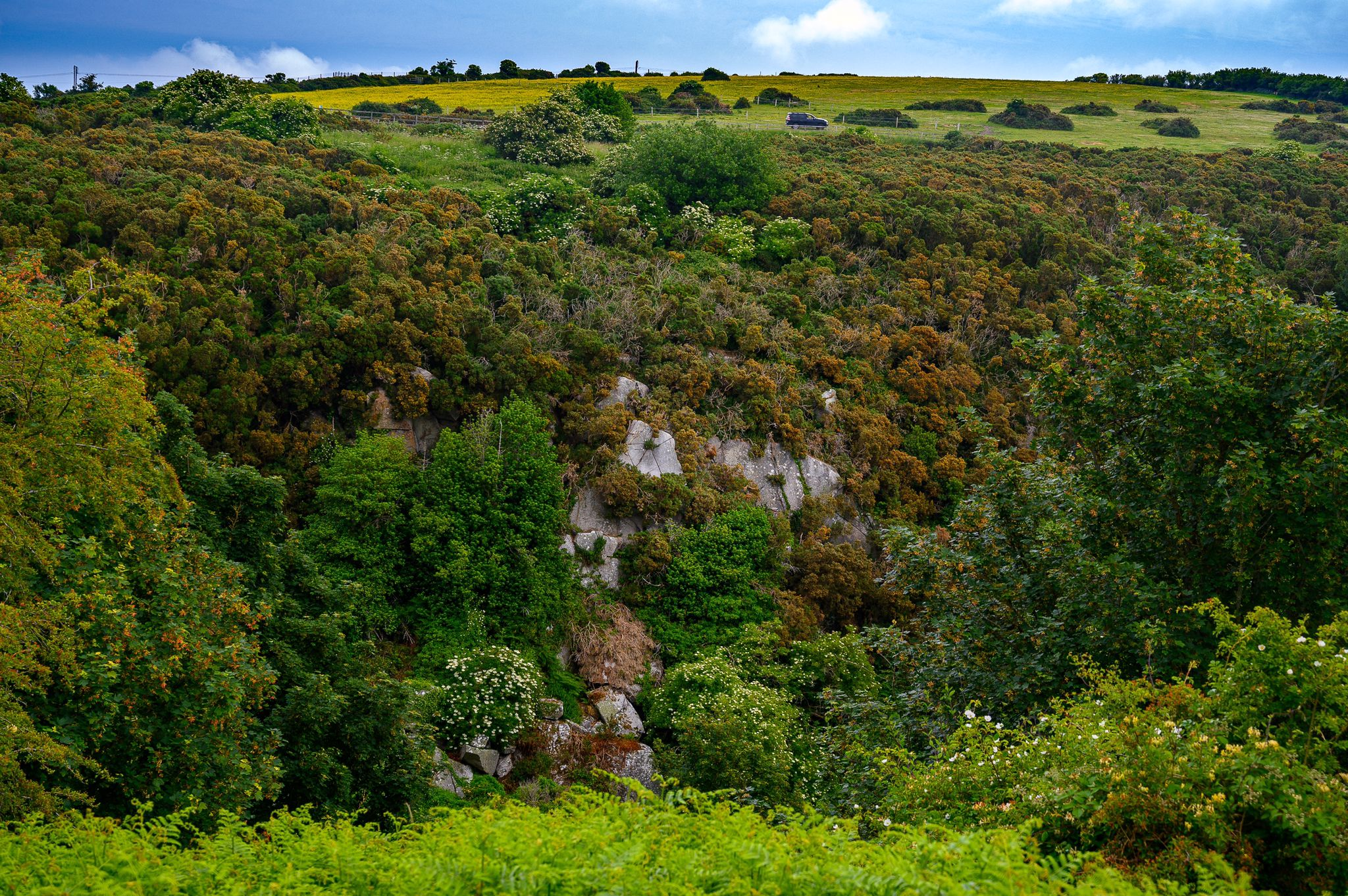
- The steep-sided slopes of Dingle Glen

- Location within Dublin
- Location: vicinity of Kilternan, Dún Laoghaire–Rathdown, Ireland
- Coordinates: 53°14′21″N 6°10′47″W
- Governing body: Private landowners

Dingle Glen (Irish: An Fhothair) is a steep-sided and V-shaped valley "gash", or glen, extending for 550-metres through the bedrock of the lowlands of the Dublin Mountains, located between Carrickmines and Kilternan. In an ecological impact assessment for a proposed development nearby, Dingle Glen was categorised as "a secluded mature broadleaf woodland, mixed with rocky outcrops, within a glacier meltwater channel, thus providing a diversity of habitats within a small undisturbed area".

== Location ==
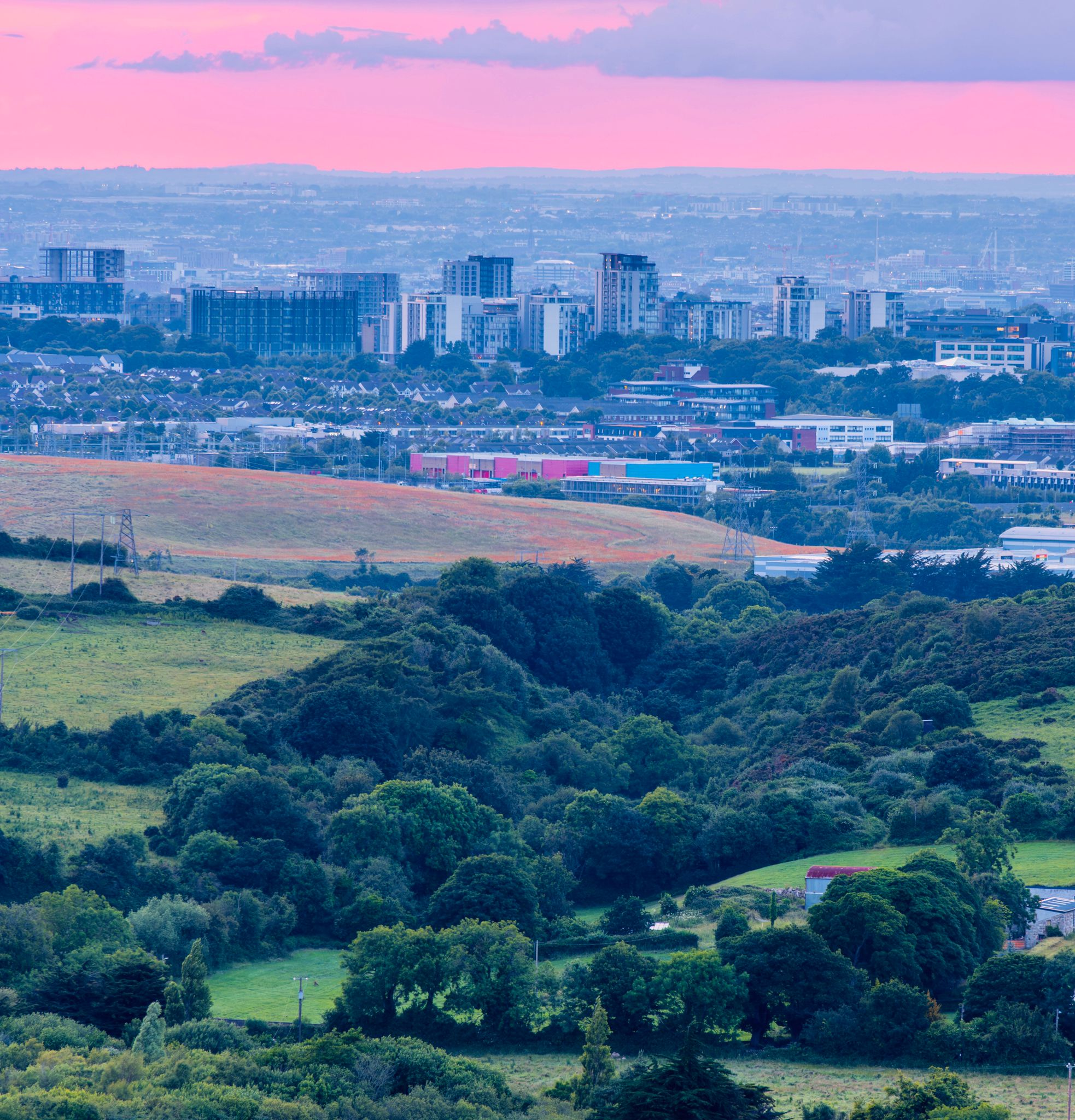
Looking north-west across the wooded Dingle Glen towards Sandyford Industrial Estate and Dublin city centre beyond

Dingle Glen is located approximately 13 kilometres to the south of Dublin city centre in the county of Dún Laoghaire–Rathdown between the populated centres of Carrickmines and Kilternan.

The 550-metre length of the glen serves as a natural boundary between the three neighbouring townlands of (a) Glenamuck South, (b) Tiknick and (c) Carrickmines Great.

== Geology ==
According to Hoare, Dingle Glen was created during the last Ice Age as a result of the massive 'Irish Sea ice-sheet' which advanced in a generally south-westwardly direction across County Dublin from a centre of origin located somewhere to the north of Ailsa Craig in the Firth of Clyde.

As a result of the movement of the ice-sheet, a "striking series of meltwaters channels" exist in the northern foothills of the Dublin/Wicklow Mountains; geological formations which include the Piperstown channel, Ballybetagh channel (occupying the depression between Ballyedmonduff Hill and Ballybetagh Hill), the Scalp (aka Barnaslingan), and the Glenamuck channel (located 600m west of Dingle Glen).

Both Dingle Glen and the Glenamuck channel extend southward as "small, ill-defined and shallow valleys", however the Glenamuck channel is pronouncedly less deep. Hoare notes that Lamplugh et al. (1903) recorded calcareous till at the southern exit of Dingle Glen and at both ends of Glenamuck, and speculated that the drift continued along the floors of both features.

A 1928 article in Geological Magazine reported the presence of large hexagonal plates of muscovite in the granite near Dingle Glen.

== Preservation ==
The entire Dingle Glen area was highlighted as a proposed Natural Heritage Area in the Dún Laoghaire–Rathdown County Council Development Plan of 2010–2016. It was still classed as such in the County Development Plan 2022-2028 in which Natural Heritage Areas (NHAs) were specified as being:

"...designated due to their national conservation value for ecological and/or geological/geomorphological heritage. They cover nationally important semi-natural and natural habitats, landforms or geomorphological features, wildlife plant and animal species or a diversity of these natural attributes. NHAs are designated under the Wildlife (Amendment) Act 2000."

In the County Development Plan 2022-2028, the protection and enhancement of the status and quality of Dingle Glen was listed as a key action.

== Access ==
A public right of way exists from Ballycorus Road to the glen via Dixon Lane.

== Gallery ==
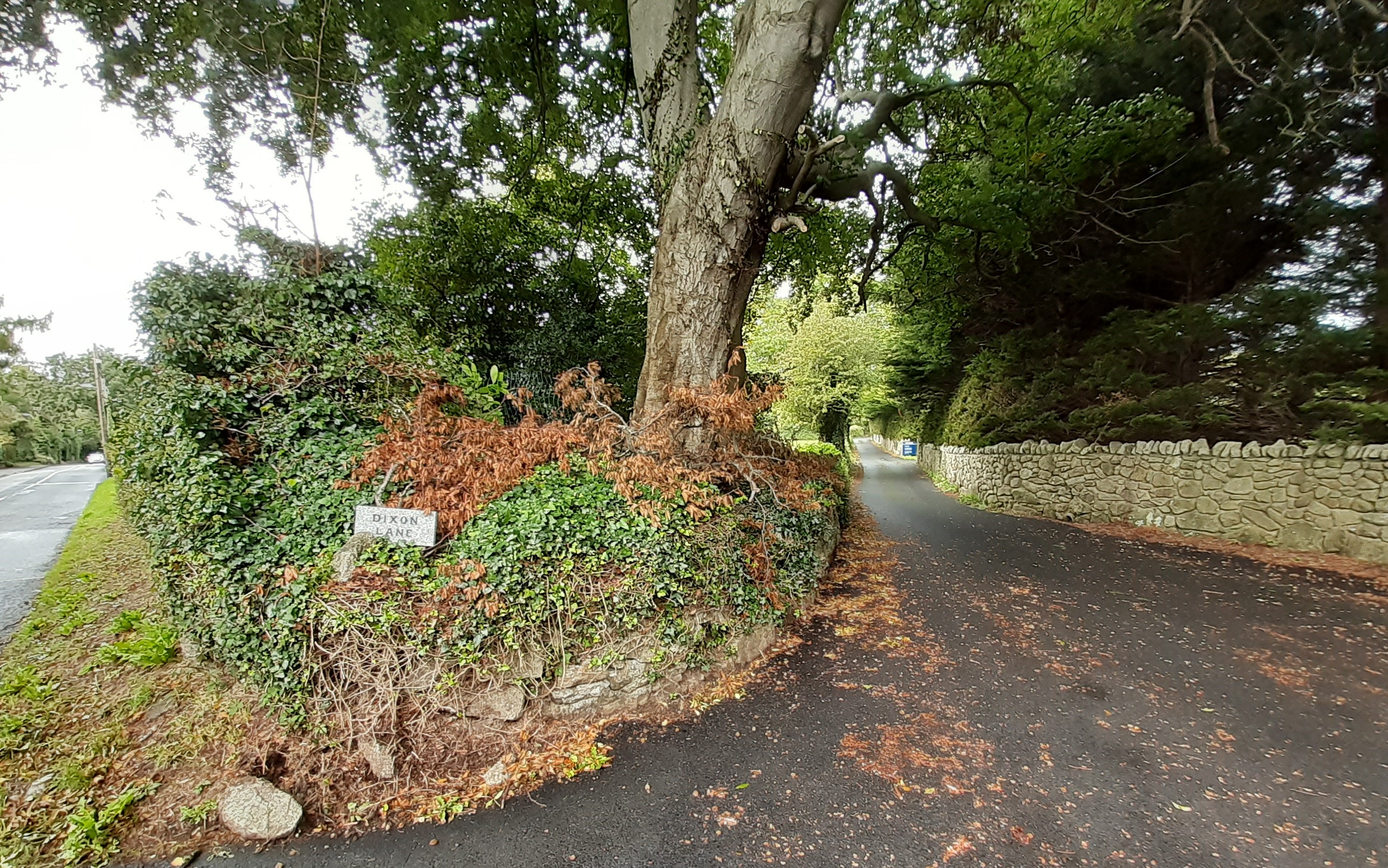
The entrance to Dixon Lane, off the Ballcorus Road (R116 road)

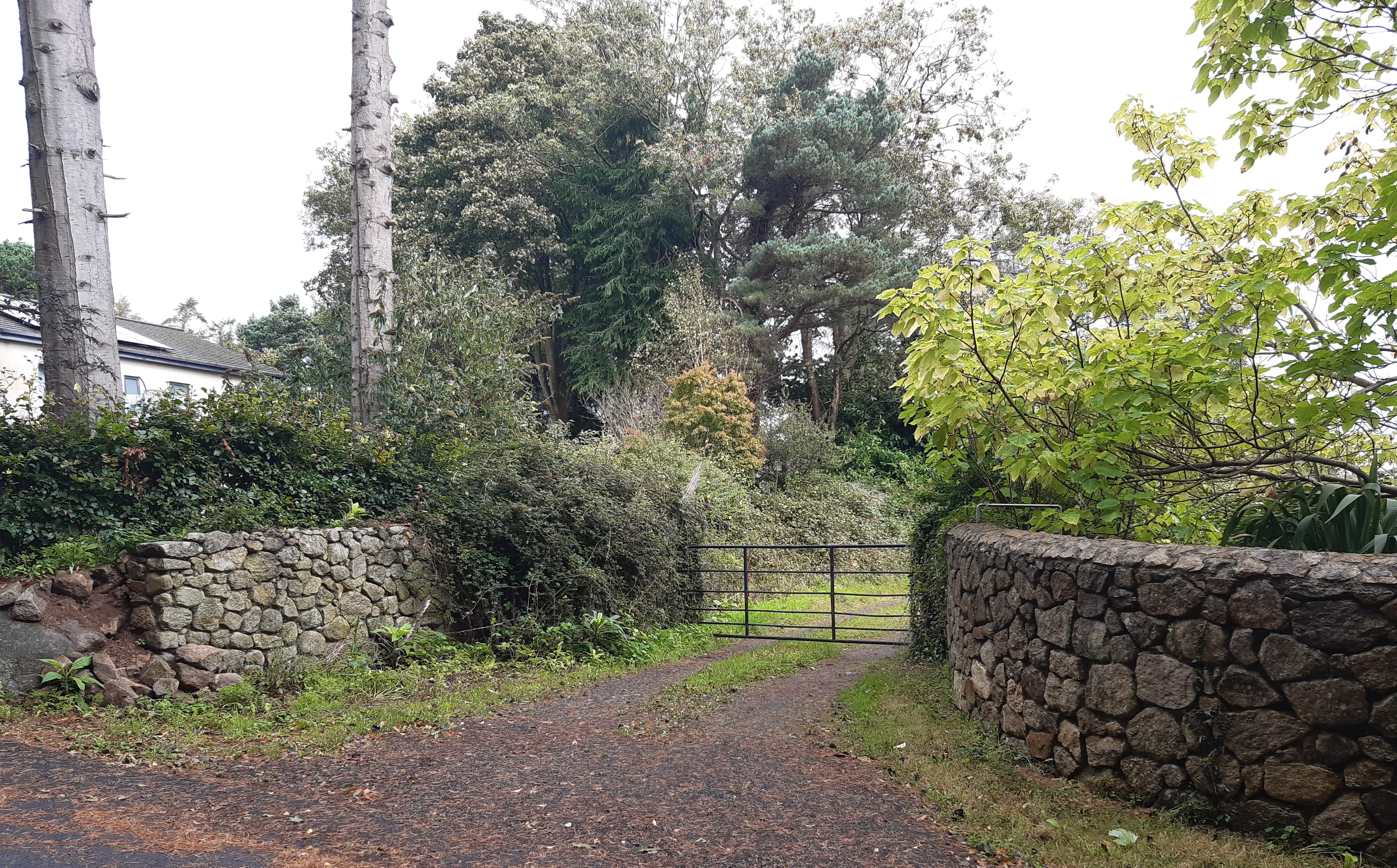
Right of way access to the glen from Dixon Lane blocked by a gate

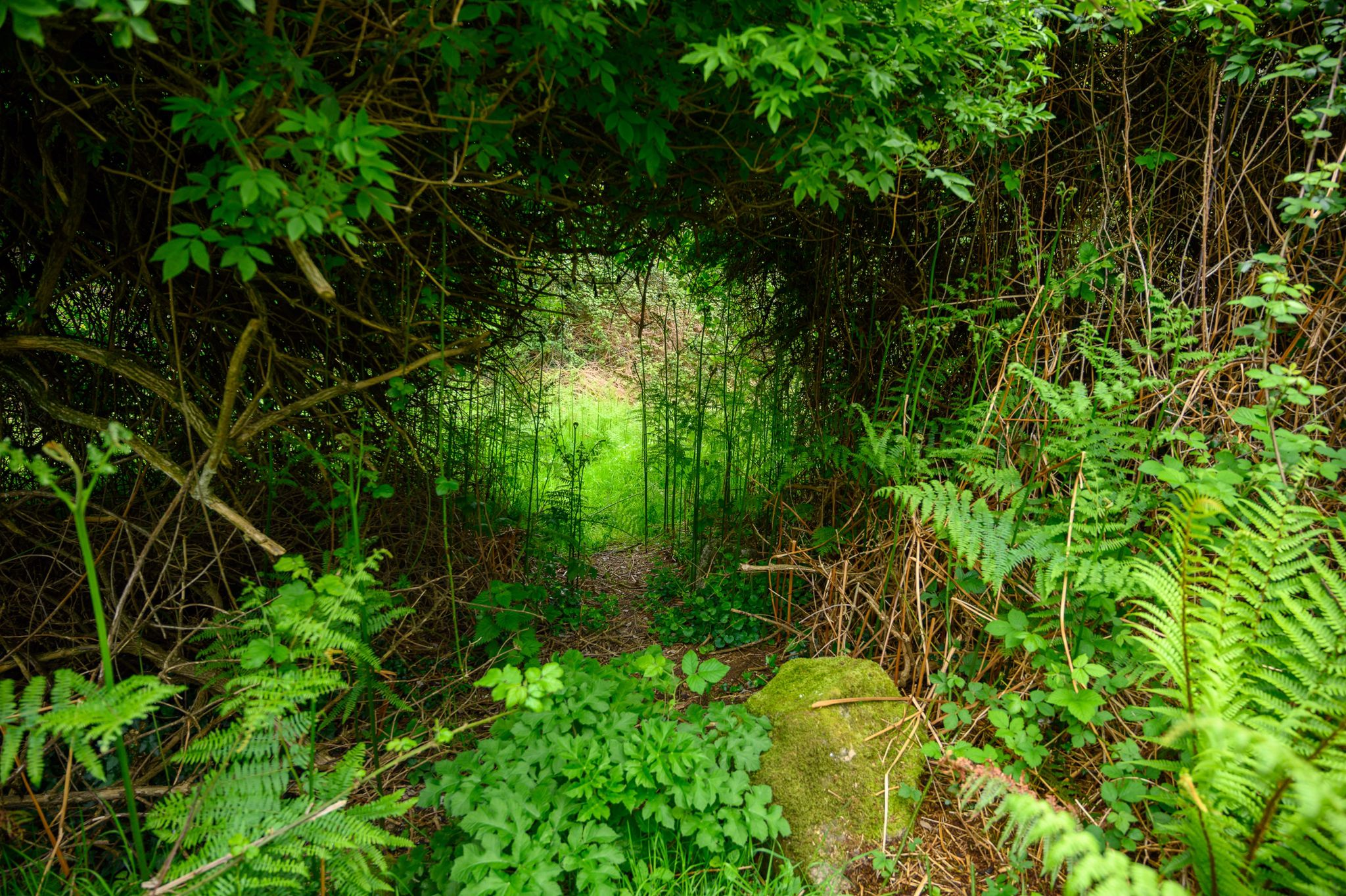
The entrance to the glen

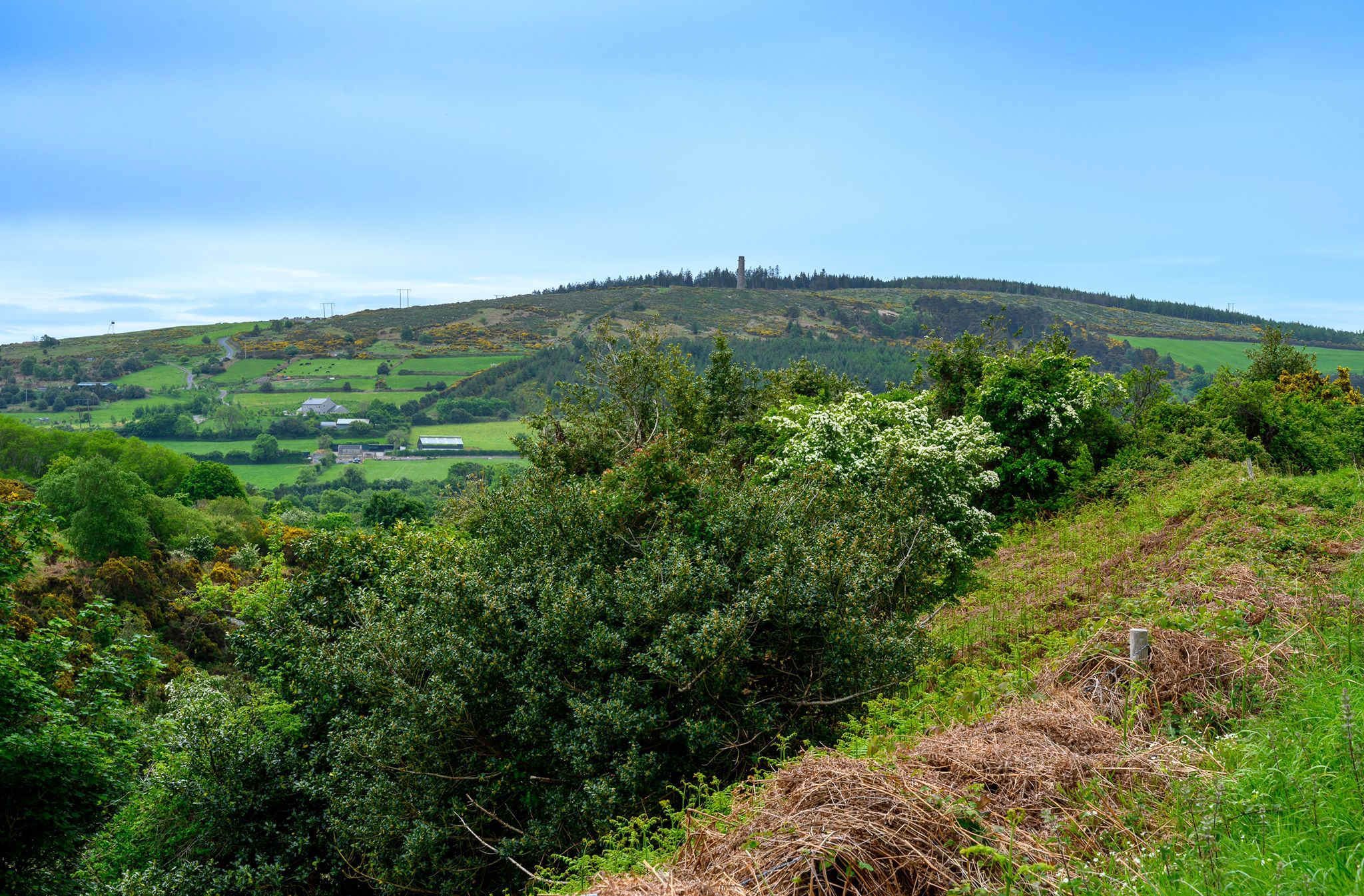
From the side of the glen looking south towards Ballycorus Leadmines

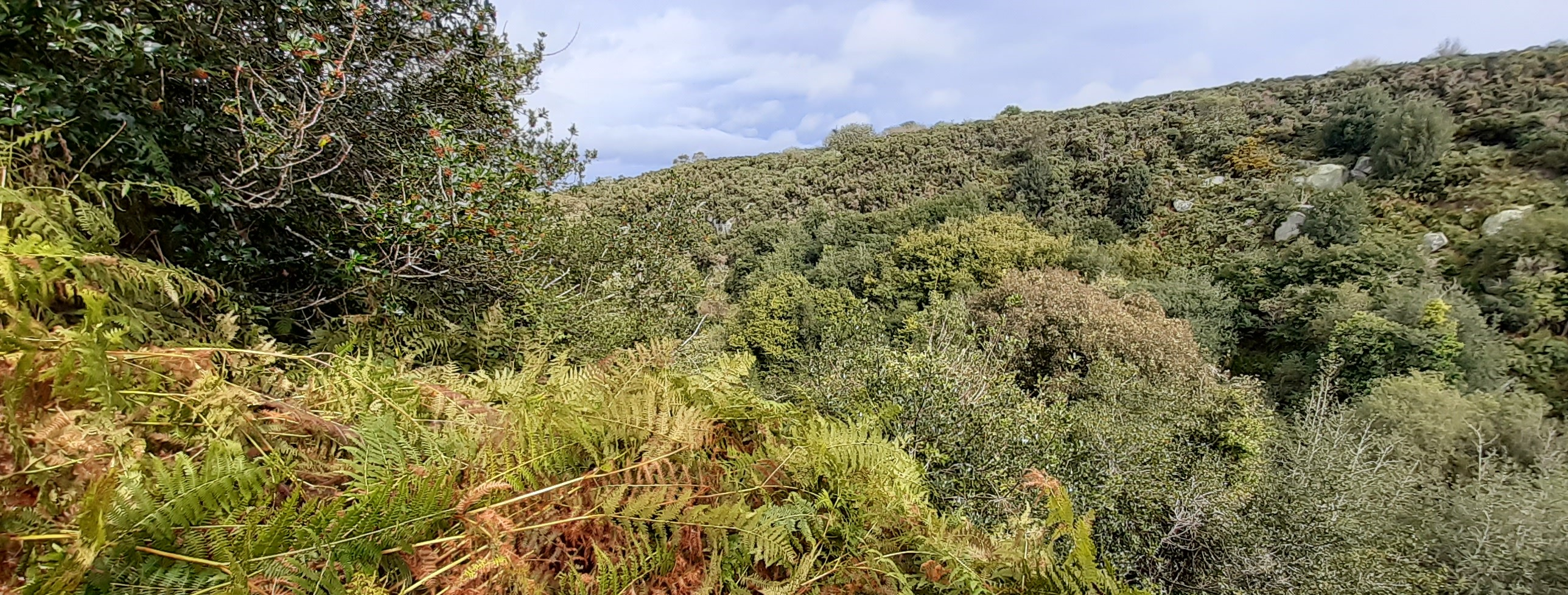
The glen in September

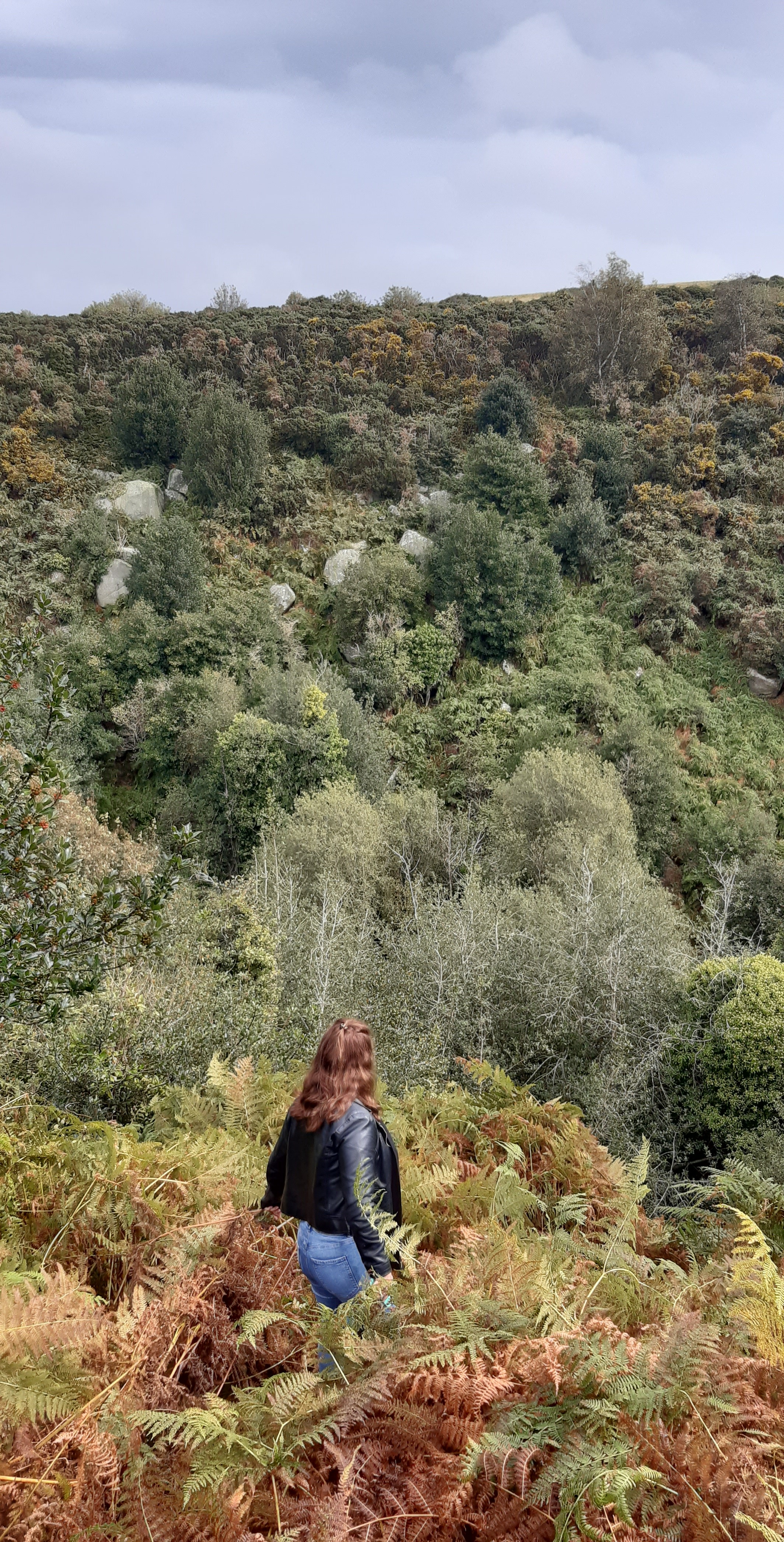
The glen in September

== See also ==
- Dingle, County Kerry
- Geology of Ireland
