= Salafia =

Salafia a surname. Notable people with the surname include:

- Alfredo Salafia (1869–1933) a Sicilian embalmer and taxidermist
- Michael Salafia, Australian rugby league footballer of the 1990s
- Vincent Salafia, Irish lawyer and environmentalist

== See also ==
- Salafi movement, a Sunni Islam movement
