= Broadmeadow River =

River in Counties Meath and Dublin, Ireland

Broadmeadow River Irish: Abhainn Ghabhra
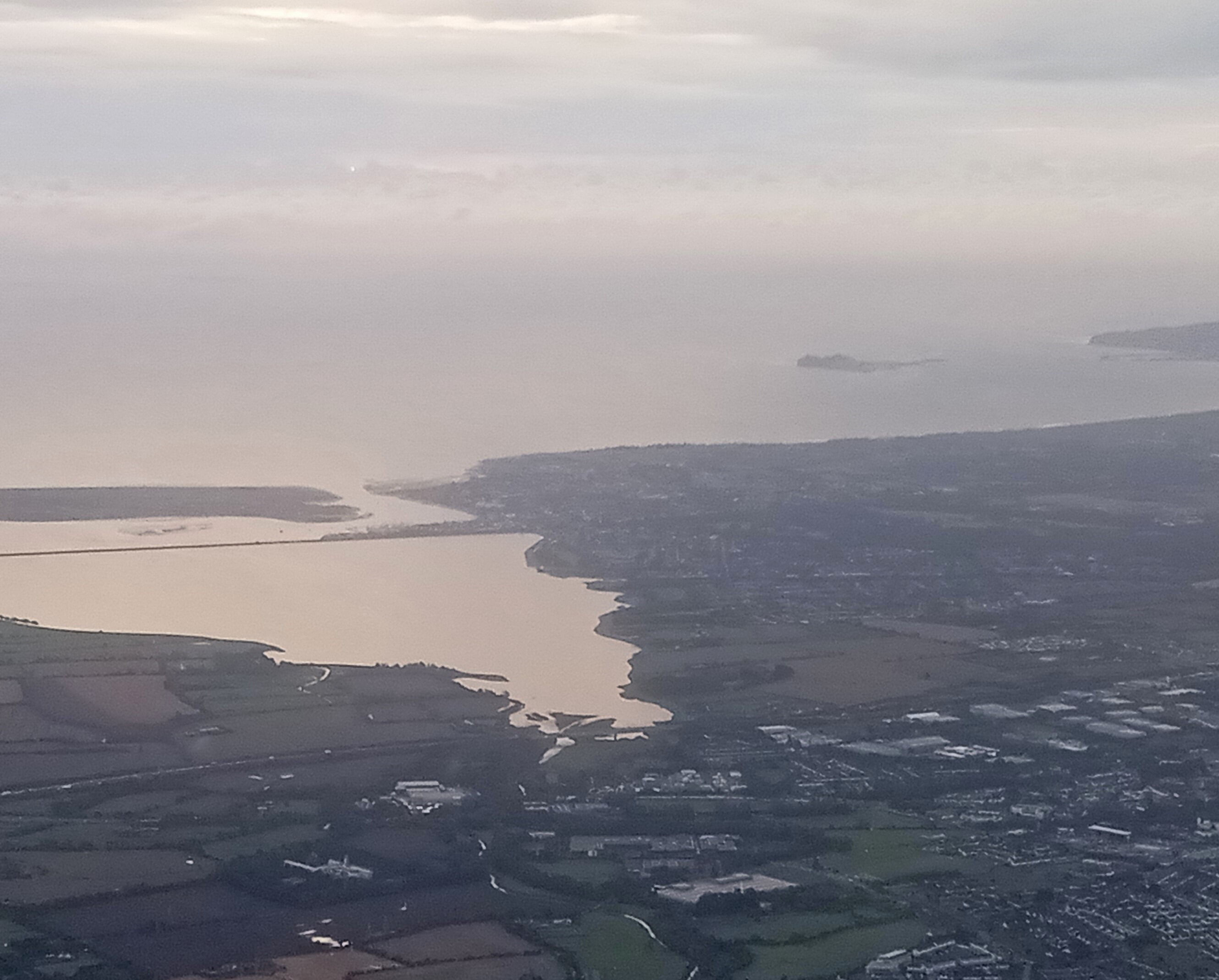

Physical characteristics
- Source
  - location: two lines near Dunshaughlin, County Meath
  - elevation: 105 m (344 ft)
- Mouth
  - location: Broadmeadow Estuary, to the Irish Sea, (by Malahide, County Dublin)
  - coordinates: 53°27′07″N 6°08′14″W
- Length: 25 km (16 mi)+ estuary 5 kilometres (3.1 mi)

Basin features
- Tributaries
  - right: Fairyhouse Stream, Dun Water, Ward River

The Broadmeadow River or Broad Meadow Water (Irish: Abhainn Ghabhra), historically called the Gower or Gowra, is a river of County Meath and northern County Dublin in Ireland, about 25 kilometres (16 mi) long. It opens into a wide estuary between Swords and Malahide, and reaches the open sea several kilometres downstream, north of Malahide village. One of the larger watercourses by volume in County Dublin, the Broadmeadow is a salmonid river, with several species of fish, including brown trout. It has many small, and a few larger, tributaries, notably the Ward River. It is under the responsibility of Meath County Council and Fingal County Council, as well as oversight of the Environmental Protection Agency.

== Name ==
In English, the river was historically known as the Broad Meadow Water, and this form is sometimes still met. Earlier it is sometimes documented as the 'Gower' or 'Gowra Water', derived from its Irish name, Abhainn Ghabhra. Its estuary has two separate names in Irish, Inbhear an Mhóinéir Leathain (a formula tied to the English language name) and Inbhear Domnainn from legends of the Fir Bolg.

== Course ==
=== Geology and catchment ===
The river flows over limestone in mostly agricultural lands, and has a catchment basin of over 170 km^{2}. It is one of the larger rivers in County Dublin by volume, although much smaller than the Liffey, Tolka or Dodder.

=== Main course ===
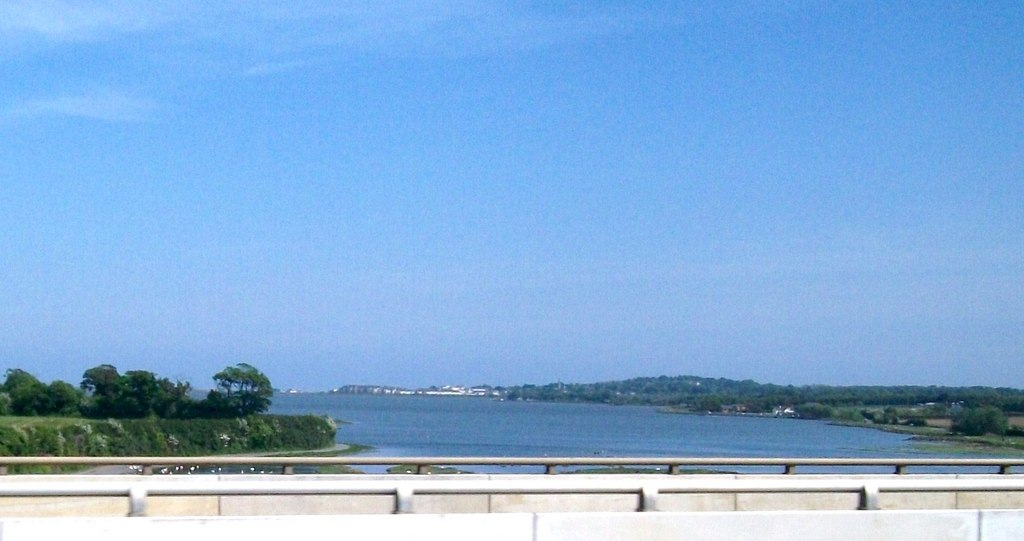
The Broadmeadow estuary (inner part) seen from above, from the M1 road bridge near Swords

The Broadmeadow rises in two branches near the village of Dunshaughlin, in County Meath. The southern branch flows by Grangend Common and later through Ratoath village, and is sometimes known as the Ratoath Stream, while the other flows on a more northerly course from the townland of Garretstown. The two branches meet at Killegland at the western edge of Ashbourne and the river flows on south of the village centre, where it meets a northern tributary. Fairyhouse Stream also flows in, and then, by the Dublin-Meath border, the Dun Water. Various small tributaries join in County Dublin, and the river flows north of Swords, and passes under Lissenhall and another historic bridge, and then the M1 motorway. Northwest of Swords, the river's main tributary, the Ward, joins. Once also the Swords River, the Ward has in turn an extensive system of tributaries.

=== Broadmeadow Estuary ===
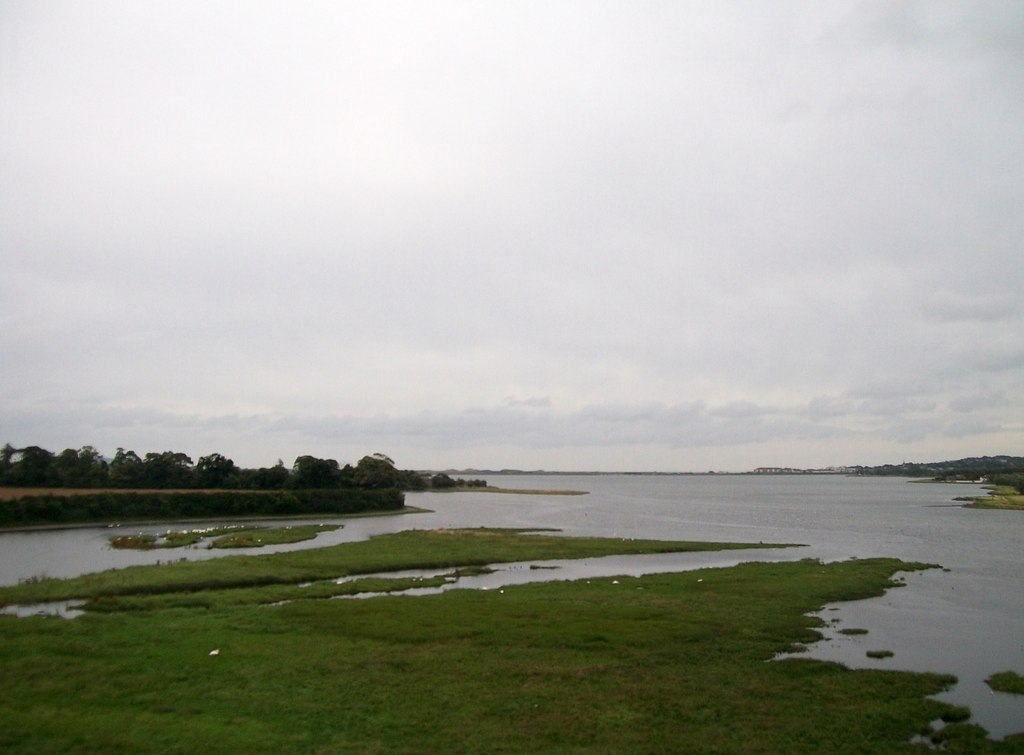
The Broad Meadow Water inner estuary, as it widens out after passing under the M1

The river enters its wide estuary by a main, northern, channel, and a narrower southern distributary, as the M1 motorway passes by overhead. Two small streams flow in from the south, then the Lissenhall Stream from the north in the first kilometre of the estuary, then the Gaybrook Stream and another from the south. The waters then flow in a narrow gap between two railway embankments, under the Broadmeadow viaduct, into the outer, near-fully tidal, estuary. After the Turvey River flows in from the north, the final outfall of the Broadmeadow occurs in a gap of around 200 metres, north of Malahide village.

=== Salinity and temperature ===
Salinity and temperature, which impact flora and fauna, have been measured for parts of the Broadmeadow system at times, notably in the two basins of the Broadmeadow estuary. The estuary is at times polyhaline, notably when tides retreat and freshwater inflows become relatively stronger, and at times euhaline; levels range from 21 to 35 parts per thousand. Spring temperatures have ranged from 14.2° to 17.2 °C in one survey, and autumn from 13.1° to 17.1 °C.

== Flora and fauna ==
The most abundant fish in the Broadmeadow, in an official study in 2017, were brown trout, followed by minnow. Also found were eels, flounder, stickleback and stone loach. While the volumes of most fish varieties, including trout, had increased since a narrower study in 2011, the river sites tested were all rated "poor" for fish ecology by Inland Fisheries Ireland. At the upper end of the estuary there is a location where swans gather.

=== Angling ===
There is limited fishing for brown trout on the Broadmeadow, on agricultural lands, generally near road bridges. Sea trout may be caught accidentally near the estuary.

== Oversight ==
The river is in the jurisdictions of Meath County Council and Fingal County Council, as well as within the oversight of Ireland's Environmental Protection Agency and Inland Fisheries Ireland.

== See also ==
- List of Rivers in County Dublin
