= Ballyboghil River =

River in Fingal (County Dublin), Ireland

Ballyboghil River (Ballyboughal River or Water)

Physical characteristics
- Source
  - location: Tobergregan, south of Garristown
  - elevation: 120 m (390 ft)
- Mouth
  - location: Rogerstown Estuary, to the Irish Sea, (by Rush, County Dublin)
- Length: 18 km (11 mi)+ estuary 4.5 kilometres (2.8 mi)

Basin features
- Tributaries
  - left: Richardstown River, Corduff River / Ballough Stream
  - right: Daws River

The Ballyboghil River or Ballyboughal Water is a river in Fingal, in the traditional County Dublin, about 18 kilometres (11 mi) long, reaching the sea by way of the 4.5 kilometres (2.8 mi)-long estuary. One of the larger watercourses by volume in the north County Dublin, the Ballyboghil is a salmonid river, with several species of fish, including brown trout. It has many small tributaries, and one larger tributary system. It is under the responsibility of Fingal County Council, and the oversight of the Environmental Protection Agency.

== Course ==
=== Main course ===
The Ballyboghil rises around Tobergregan, south of Garristown in the extreme northwest of Fingal and the traditional County Dublin. It curves southeast near a cemetery in the townland of Grallagh, and continues to Brownscross. At Westpalstown it receives the tributary Daws River, which has come by way of the hamlet of Oldtown. The river flows on to and through the village for which it is named, Ballyboughal, itself named for a holy staff associated with St Patrick and destroyed in the Reformation period.

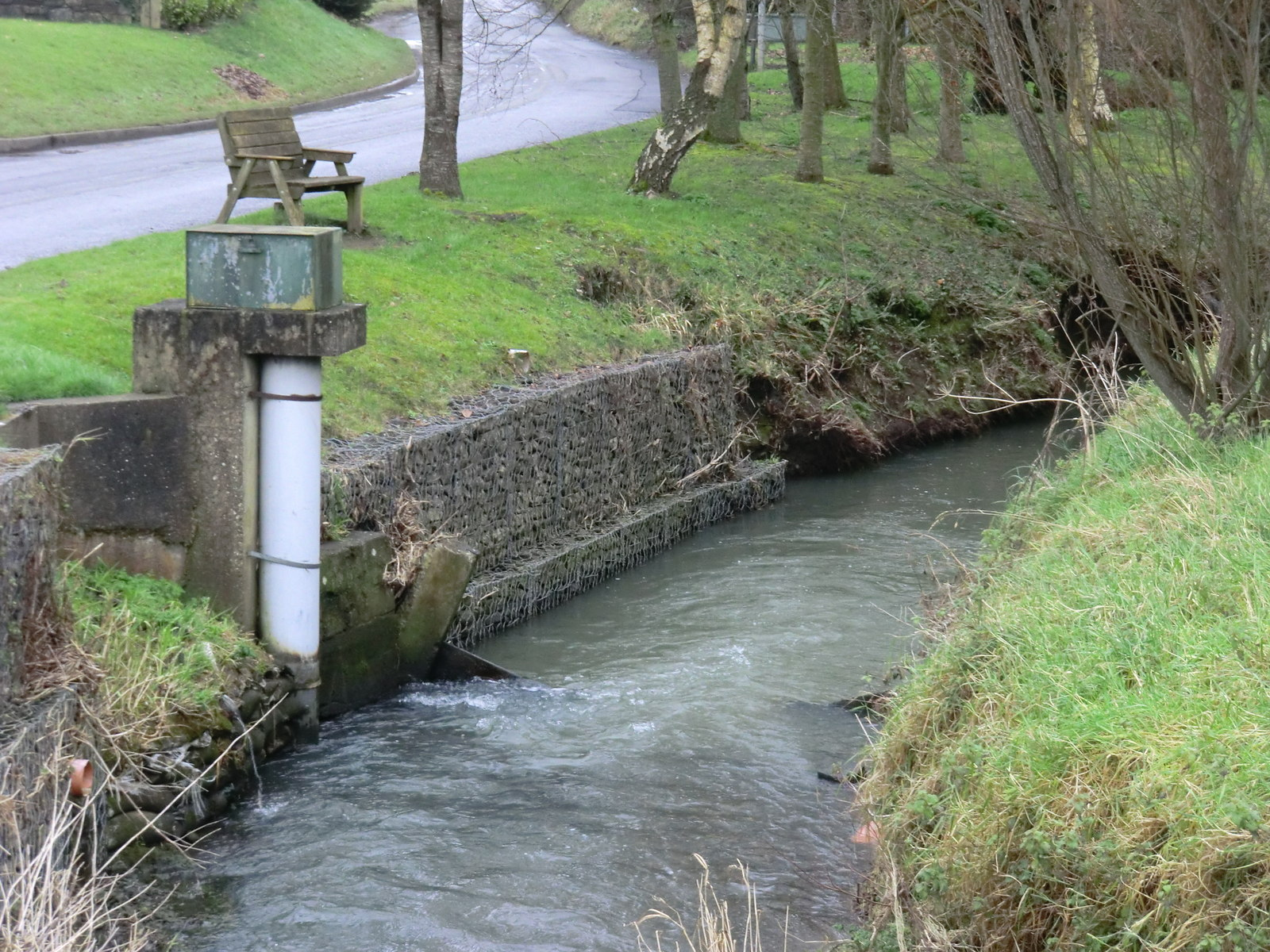
The Ballyboghil just downstream of the eponymous village, with flood gauge and bench

Richardstown River flows into the Ballyboghil near the site of the school and nunnery of Grace Dieu, and a channel takes some of the flow of the river south to the Turvey River. As it approaches its estuary, the river flows under Daws Bridge, and then as it widens into the estuary, the Corduff River, also known as the Ballough Stream, and once also the Nine-Stream River, joins. The Corduff, in turn and as indicated by one of its alternative names, has many small tributaries.

=== Rogerstown Estuary ===
The Ballyboghil and Corduff combined flow is the main supply to the 4.5 km-long Rogerstown Estuary, into which Balleally Stream, Bride's Stream, Jone's Stream and two small streams flow. The estuary is bisected by the Dublin-Belfast railway. Inside the line of the rail embankment the estuary is muddy, and a large refuse facility operated for many years. Beyond the railway the estuary continues, bends north, and then runs east and southeast out to the Irish Sea.

== Flora and fauna ==
The Ballyboghil holds both brown and sea trout, as well as eels and Atlantic salmon. The Ballough also holds trout and salmon.

== Oversight ==
The river is in the jurisdiction of Fingal County Council, as well as within the oversight of Ireland's Environmental Protection Agency and Inland Fisheries Ireland.

== See also ==
- List of Rivers in County Dublin
