= Ward River (Ireland) =

River in County Meath and northern County Dublin, Ireland

Ward River Irish: Abhainn an Bharda
- Etymology: Norman / French: Le Warde

Physical characteristics
- Source
  - location: near Killester and Fairyhouse Racecourse, County Meath
  - elevation: 95 m (312 ft)
- Mouth: Broadmeadow River
  - location: near Swords
  - coordinates: 53°28′13″N 6°12′39″W
- Length: 18 kilometres (11 mi)

Basin features
- River system: Broadmeadow River
- Tributaries
  - left: St Margaret's Stream
  - right: Shallon Stream

The Ward River (Irish: Abhainn an Bharda), sometimes historically the Swords River, is a watercourse of County Meath and northern County Dublin. About 18 kilometres (11 mi) long; it runs through the town of Swords and then flows into the Broadmeadow River. The Ward is a salmonid river, with several species of fish, including brown trout. It has several small tributaries. The river is in the jurisdictions of Meath and Fingal County Councils, as well as within the oversight of the Environmental Protection Agency.

== Name ==
In English, the river was historically known as the "Ward", from the Norman or French "Le Warde", probably connected to the idea of "guarding", for example the castle at Swords. In some sources the river is known wholly, or for those parts near Swords, as the Swords River.

== Geology and catchment ==
The river flows over limestone in mostly agricultural lands in its upper and middle courses, and in urban spaces around Swords; it has a catchment basin of over 60 sq. km.

== Course ==
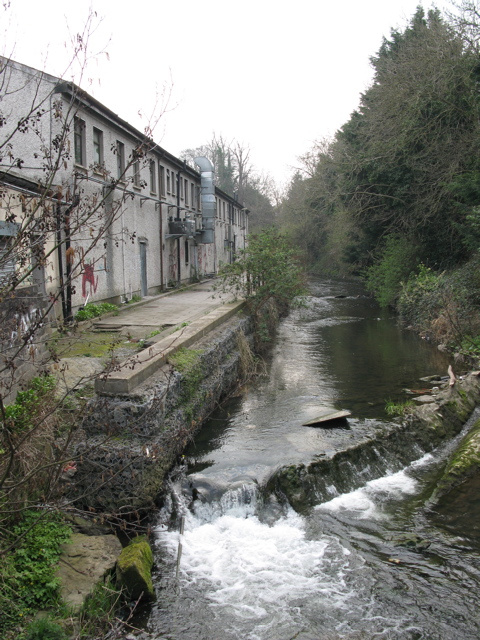
Ward River in central Swords

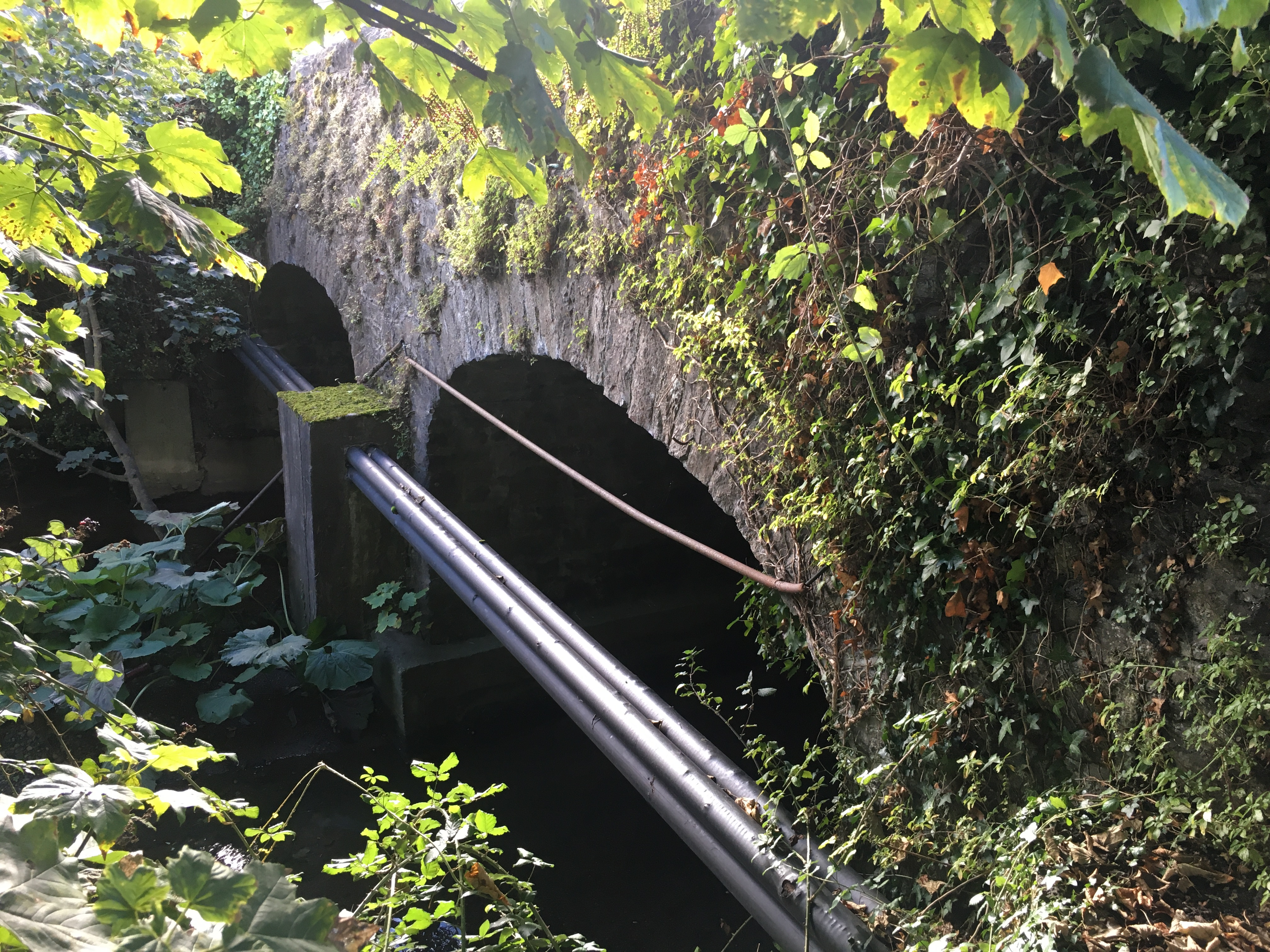
Ward River at Scotchstone Bridge, exiting Swords

The Ward rises near Killester in County Meath, west of Rathbeggan and south of Fairyhouse Racecourse. It takes in tributaries as it proceeds southeast, including from the racecourse area, then runs east to the county boundary.

Within Fingal, in the historic County Dublin, the river has several small tributaries, including Mabestown Steam at the western edge of the county. It flows under Coolquoy Bridge and Coolatrath Bridge, and a nameless stream joins, followed by Shallon Stream and, at Skephubble, St Margaret's Stream, ultimately from Hunstown, passing via St Margaret's. The river continues into Ward River Valley Park, passing Knocksedan Bridge. Near the site of Brackenstown House there is a pond, sometimes called Ussher's Lake, and the remnants of a mill site. There used to be other ponds in this area, but one was reduced in scale, and then filled in, and the other reduced to a widened section of river. This section of the river is sometimes known as "the Jacko". Towards the end of the park, another mill used to exist, under Gallows Hill, as the river approaches central Swords. Just below Main Street a small stream from Rathingle flows in, behind a pub and near the town's holy well. The Ward parallels Main Street, and then runs a little west of Swords Castle, flowing under Scotchstone Bridge. After passing Balheary Bridge, and under the old road from Swords towards Drogheda, it merges into the Broadmeadow River in an area of overgrown land, before the parent river opens out into its estuary.

== Flora and fauna ==
The most abundant fish in the Ward, in an official study of 2017, were brown trout, followed by minnow. Also found were eels, stickleback and stone loach. Two thirds of sites checked were rated "moderate", one sixth "good" and one sixth "poor" for fish ecology by Inland Fisheries Ireland.

=== Angling ===
There is limited fishing for brown trout on the Ward.

== See also ==
- List of rivers of County Dublin
