= List of rivers of County Dublin =

County Dublin (shaded dark green)

There are more than 130 named rivers and streams in the traditional County Dublin, Ireland, which comprises the city of Dublin and the surrounding counties of Dún Laoghaire–Rathdown, Fingal and South Dublin.

== Rivers and tributaries ==
The rivers and streams are listed in one table, with systems such as the Liffey (and that of its major sub-system, the Dodder), Broadmeadow, Tolka and Shanganagh identified within the table. The name of each watercourse, the location of its mouth or confluence point and whether, for tributaries, they enter their parent on the right or left bank, is noted. Unnamed tributaries are not included. Most are shown on the back cover map of the Doyle reference, and those in the central area are shown on the main and section-specific maps in the Sweeney reference.

Name Alternative name(s)	System, if applicable	Order (Classic)	Order (Strahler)	Bank	Source	Mouth / point of confluence	Refs	Notes
Delvin River; Irish: An Ailbhine	Delvin	1st	2	-	NW of Garristown	Near Knocknagin, N of Bremore		Runs N of Naul, S of Stamullin, two cascades of over 5m near Naul
Bartramstown River	Delvin	2nd	1	Left	Near Fourknocks	NE of Garristown		
Hurley River	Nanny (Meath)	2nd	2	Right	Tobergregan, S of Garristown	(to the Nanny R., Meath)		
Bremore River	-	1st	2	-	NW of Balbriggan	N of Balbriggan		
Bracken River; Matt River	-	1st	3	-	W and S of Balbriggan	Balbriggan		
Inch Stream	Bracken (Matt)	2nd	2	Right	S of Balbriggan	Stephenstown, Balbriggan		
Tanner's Water	Bracken (Matt)	3rd	1	Right	E of Balrothery	N of Balrothery		
Brook Stream; Mill Stream	Brook Stream	1st	2	-	Branches W of Skerries	Skerries		Supplying (but not flowing through) the mill pond for the mill complex at Skerries
Milverton Stream	Brook Stream	2nd	1	Left	NW of Skerries	W of Skerries		
St. Catherine's Stream	-	1st	1	-	NW of Kenure Demesne	Brook's End, N of Rush		
Kenure Stream	-	1st	1	-	W of Kenure Demesne	E of Kenure Demesne		Runs alongside Palmer Road in culvert, and then in nice valley down to north end of Rush's North Beach
Rush Town Stream; Brook Stream	-	1st	1	-	W of Rush	North Beach, Rush		
Bride's Stream	Bride's Stream	1st	2	-	N of Lusk	S of Whitestown, Rogerstown Estuary		
Jone's Stream	Bride's Stream	2nd	1	Left	NE of Lusk	S of Whitestown, Rogerstown Estuary		
Baleally Stream	-	1st	1	-	Lusk (south of Round Tower)	Newhaggard, after Baleally, Rogerstown Estuary		
Ballyboghil (or Ballyboughal) River	Ballyboghil	1st	3	-	Tobergregan, S of Garristown	Rogerstown Estuary		
Daws River	Ballyboghil	2nd	2	Right	Rath, by Meath border	N of Oldtown		
Richardstown River	Ballyboghil	2nd	2	Left	Grallagh	Gracedieu, S of Richardstown		
Corduff River; Ballough Stream or River; Nine-Stream River	Ballyboghil	2nd	2	Left	Many branches	Just W of Rogerstown Estuary, near Newhaggard		
Wimbletown Stream	Ballyboghil	3rd	1	Left	N of Ballyboghil	To Corduff, at Newtowncorduff, S of Ballough		One of two parallel streams, the nameless other comes from branches beyond Damastown
Turvey River (last part: River Pill)	-	1st	2	-	Branches from Cookstown, Magillstown	S of Newbridge Demesne		
Lissenhall Stream	-	1st	-	near Behinstown	1	Lissenhall, south of Newport House		
Broadmeadow River (or Broad Meadow Water); Irish: Abhainn Ghabhra	Broadmeadow	1st	3	-	(Meath, near Dunshaughlin)	Broadmeadow Estuary		5th largest flow in Dublin, wide Broadmeadow Estuary now semi-impounded by rail embankment
Dun Water	Broadmeadow	2nd	2	Right		Dublin/Meath border		
Ward River; Swords River	Broadmeadow	2nd	2	Right	(Meath)	N of Swords		
Shallon Stream	Broadmeadow	3rd	1	Right	Cherryhound	To Ward		
Mabestown Stream	Broadmeadow	3rd	1	Left		To Ward, Laurestown, near Corrstown		
St. Margaret's Stream	Broadmeadow	3rd	1	Right	Near St. Margaret's	To Ward		
Gaybrook Stream; Gay Brook	-	1st	2	-	Near Cloghran	W of Malahide (Yellow Walls / Cave Marsh)		
Sluice River	Sluice	1st	2	-	from below three streams	N end of Baldoyle Bay		
Forrest Little Stream	Sluice	2nd	1	n/a	Near Dublin Airport	Merger with Wad in Baskin area		
Wad Stream	Sluice	2nd	1	n/a	Near Dublin Airport	Merger with Forrest Little in Baskin area		
Kealy's Stream	Sluice	2nd	1	n/a	Near Dublin Airport	Merger with above two in Kinsealy, forming Sluice		
Hazelbrook Stream	Sluice	2nd	1	Left	S of Malahide	W of Portmarnock		
Mayne River	Mayne	1st	3	-	from below two streams	Midpoint of Baldoyle Bay		Studied for GDSDS
Cuckoo Stream	Mayne	2nd	2	n/a	branches near Dublin Airport	Merger with Turnapin E of Balgriffin		
Turnapin Stream	Mayne	2nd	2	n/a	Harristown	Merger with Cuckoo Stream E of Balgriffin		Main flow of Mayne
Grange Stream	Mayne	2nd	2	Right	W Donaghmede	Baldoyle		Long visible sections culverted in Donaghmede in 1980's, and in Baldoyle in early 2000s - still in open from the former Racecourse lands to near the Mayne
Seagrange Park Stream	Mayne	3rd	1	Right	Bayside / lower Kilbarrack	Baldoyle		Visible along DART line from Bayside and at eastern side of Seagrange Park
Bloody Stream		1st	1	-	Black Linn, Howth	Claremont Strand		One of several Howth Estate streams (the only named one)
Offington Stream		1st	1	-	E of Deer Park golf course	Western Howth Harbour		
Boggeen Stream; Gray's Brook; Tramway Brook; Boddeen Stream		1st	1	-	W of Thormanby Road, Howth (hollow where part of Thormanby Woods built)	Eastern Howth Harbour		Gray's or Grey's Brook much used locally, still visible in the woodland N of Thormanby Woods and along Gray's Lane
Coulcour Brook; Coolcur Brook		1st	1	-	Above Howth village	Balscadden Bay		Visible briefly on Cowbooter Lane
Whitewater Brook		1st	2	-	S part of the Ben of Howth	Whitewater Brook Cove, having crossed under Carrickbrack and Thormanby Roads		Visible briefly near Cliff Walk, and by public car park upstream, and unnamed tributary visible at chain of small ponds above Thormanby Road
Balsaggart Stream		1st	1	-	Between the Ben of Howth and Shelmartin	W of Drumleck Point		Comes to Carrickbrack Road (and sometimes onto it) by Lonethorn
Carrickbrack Stream		1st	1	-	Between Dun Hill and Shelmartin	E Sutton Strand		Piped mouth sometimes visible on Sutton Strand
Santa Sabina Stream		1st	2	-	Howth Demesne (S of main avenue)	E Sutton Strand (155m from Carrickbrack)		Piped mouth sometimes visible on Sutton Strand
Kilbarrack Stream; Daunagh Water		1st	-	S of Turnapin	S of Bayside, with secondary, artificial mouth at end of Kilbarrack Road			
Blackbanks Stream		1st	1	-	Edenmore, S of Tonlegee Road	Meeting of Howth and James Larkin Roads		
Fox Stream; Foxe's Lane Watercourse		1st	1	-	Former quarry area, now Edenmore Park	S of Fox's Lane, Raheny		
Santry River; Raheny River (part) Quinn's River		1st	2	-	Harristown and Dubber	Alongside Bull Island causeway, Raheny		Studied for GDSDS
Naniken River; Nannikin or Naneken (part) Ballyhoy River		1st	1	-	N Santry	By Duck Pond, St. Anne's Park		
Wad River		1st	1	-	Poppintree	Inner end of Tolka Estuary / Clontarf Bay		
River Tolka; Irish: An Tulcha	Tolka	1st	-	-	(Meath, NW of Batterstown)	Tolka Estuary / Clontarf Bay		River Tolka Flooding Study added to GDSDS
Clonee Stream	Tolka	2nd	-	Right	(Meath)	N of N3, near Clonee		
(West) Pinkeen Stream	Tolka	2nd	-	Left	(Meath)	Damastown		
(East) Pinkeen Stream	Tolka	2nd	-	Left	N of Tyrellstown	Mulhuddart		
Warrenstown Stream	Tolka	2nd	-	Left	N of Warrenstown	S of Warrenstown		
Scribblestown Stream; Cappoge Stream	Tolka	2nd	-	Left	N of Abbotstown	Scribblestown		
Finglaswood Stream; Mount Olivat Stream	Tolka	2nd	-	Left	SW Finglas	Finglaswood / Tolka Valley Park		
Finglas River	Tolka	2nd	-	Left	Ratoath Road, N of Finglas	S of Finglas		Studied for GDSDS
Claremont Stream	Tolka	2nd	-	Left	W of Finglas	Glasnevin (near RC church)		
Cemetery Drain	Tolka	2nd	-	Right	Near Liffey Junction	Glasnevin (near RC church)		
Hampstead Stream	Tolka	2nd	-	Left	DCU and Hillside Farm branches	W Drumcondra		
Marino Stream	Tolka	2nd	-	Left	High Park area, Drumcondra	Tolka Estuary, Clontarf		
River Liffey; Irish: An Life (previously Irish: An Riuithreach)	Liffey	1st	-	-	(Wicklow, Liffey Head Bog)	Dublin Bay		
Brittas River	Liffey	2nd	-	Right	Seechon Mountain, Dublin	S of Kilbride, Wicklow		
Tobermaclugg Stream	Liffey	2nd	-	Right	S of Grand Canal	W of Lucan		
Griffeen River (part) Racreena River (part) Esker River	Liffey	2nd	-	Right	Saggart Hill	Lucan		
Kilmahuddrick Stream	Liffey	3rd	-	Right	Kilmahuddrick	To Griffeen, N of Grand Canal		
Westmanstown Stream	Liffey	2nd	-	Left	(Meath)	S of Luttrellstown		
Diswellstown Stream	Liffey	2nd	-	Left	Carpenterstown and Castleknock	S of Diswellstown, west of Knockmaroon		
Glenaulin Stream; Pound Lane Stream	Liffey	2nd	-	Right	W of Palmerstown	Glenaulin Weir		
Furry Glen Stream; Knockmaroon Stream	Liffey	2nd	-	Left	W of Farmleigh	S of Furry Glen		
St Laurence Stream	Liffey	2nd	-	Right	Ballyfermot	S of Chapelizod		
Creosote Stream	Liffey	2nd	-	Right	Inchicore	Garden of Remembrance		
Magazine Stream	Liffey	2nd	-	Left	E Castleknock	Islandbridge		
River Camac; Cammock or Cammoke River (part) Clondalkin River; Irish: An Chamóg	Liffey	2nd	-	Right	Mount Seskin	By Heuston Station		4th largest flow in Dublin, studied for GDSDS
Ferny Glinn	Liffey	3rd	-	Left		To Camac, Brittas Ponds area		
The Two Slades	Liffey	3rd	-	Left	To W	To Camac, N of Brittas		Two distinct streams but no separate names
Toberach	Liffey	3rd	-	Right	To E	To Camac, N of Brittas		The last stretch of this small stream had a separate name, "The Stream of the Neighing of Horses"
Boherboy Stream (Upper reaches) Corbally Slade River	Liffey	3rd	-	Right	Next valley east of Slade of Saggart	To Camac, N of Saggart village, near Citywest		
Brownsbarn Stream	Liffey	3rd	-	Right	Between Corbally and Lugmore	To Camac, N of Saggart village, near Citywest		
Fettercairn Stream	Liffey	3rd	-	Right		To Camac, NE of Saggart village		
Robinhood Stream; Coolfan River	Liffey	3rd	-	Right	Ballymount and Greenhills	To Camac, by Robinhood Ind. Estate		
Gallblack Stream	Liffey	3rd	-	Left	From the merger of the next two streams	To Camac, near Bluebell Cemetery		
Blackditch Stream	Liffey	4th	-	n/a	Rowlagh	Merger with Gallanstown to form Gallblack		
Gallanstown Stream	Liffey	4th	-	n/a	Neilstown	Merger with Blackditch to form Gallblack		
Drimnagh Castle Stream; Bluebell Stream	Liffey	3rd	-	Right		To Camac, bend of Lansdowne Valley		Supplies the moat at Drimnagh Castle
Walkinstown Stream	Liffey	3rd	-	Right		To Camac, Lansdowne Valley		
Finisk Stream; Viceregal Stream; Zoo Stream	Liffey	2nd	-	Right	E Castleknock	Just upstream of Heuston Bridge		Flows through Aras an Uachtarain and Zoo lakes
Bradogue River (also Bradoge, Bradok); Glascoynock; Pole Water; St. Michan's Streams	Liffey	2nd	-	Left	Cabra	Ormond Quay		
River Poddle (Upper reaches) Tymon River; Irish: An Poitéal	Liffey	2nd	-	Right	Cookstown / N Tallaght	Wellington Quay		Studied for GDSDS. Related are the two City Watercourse lines (from the Dodder and from Mount Argus). Alternate (artificial) courses include the Abbey Stream and Tenter Water, and related artificial lines include Lord Limerick's Watercourse and probably Col(e)man's Brook.
Commons Water; Coombe Stream	Liffey	3rd	-	Left	Crumlin and Drimnagh	To Poddle, at New Street / Kevin Street junction		Passes through the Coombe
Steyne River; Stein and other variants	Liffey	2nd	-	Right	S of Adelaide Road near Charlemont Bridge	Burgh Quay		
River Dodder; Irish: An Dothra	Liffey	2nd	-	Right	Kippure (mountain)	Ringsend		3rd largest flow in Dublin, merges with the Grand Canal as they join the Liffey
Tromanallison ("Allison's Brook")	Liffey	3rd	-	n/a	Near Kippure	Headwaters of Dodder		Either primary source or very early contributor to the Dodder
Mareen's Brook	Liffey	3rd	-	Right	(Wicklow) SE of Kippure	To Dodder, SE of Kippure		
Cot Brook	Liffey	3rd	-	Left	Kippure / Seefingan area	Dodder main course merged in Glenasmole		
Slade Brook	Liffey	3rd	-	Left	Seefingan (mountain)	To Dodder, Glenasmole		
Glassavullaun Stream	Liffey	3rd	-	Left	Seefingan (mountain) area	Glenasmole (to reservoir system rather than main Dodder flow)		
Ballinascorney Stream	Liffey	3rd	-	Left	Ballinascorney	Glenasmole (most of flow to reservoir system rather than main Dodder flow)		
Ballymaice Stream	Liffey	3rd	-	Left		Glenasmole (most of flow to reservoir system rather than main Dodder flow)		
Piperstown Stream	Liffey	3rd	-	Left	Around Featherbed Bog	To Dodder, below Friarstown Glen		
Jobstown Stream; Tallaght Stream	Liffey	3rd	-	Left	To Dodder, S of Jobstown	E of Tallaght		
Orlagh Stream	Liffey	3rd	-	Right	Woodtown / Orlagh	To Dodder, N of Firhouse / Knocklyon		
Owendoher River	Liffey	3rd	-	Right	Near Glendoo Mountain	To Dodder, NW of Rathfarnham village, alongside Bushy Park		
Glendoo Stream	Liffey	4th	-	Right	W of Glendoo Mountain	To Owendoher headwaters, near Piperstown Gap		
Whitechurch Stream (part) River Glin	Liffey	4th	-	Right	Tibradden area	To Owendoher, Willbrook (Rathfarnham)		
Little Dargle River	Liffey	3rd	-	Right	Two Rock Mountain	N of Churchtown by Terenure		Prominent in Marlay Park
Castle Stream	Liffey	4th	-	Right	Rathfarnham	To Little Dargle, near Ely Arch (Rathfarnham)		
River Slang; Dundrum River; Dundrum Slang; Ticknock Stream (upper part)	Liffey	3rd	-	Right	Three Rock Mountain	To Dodder, near Milltown		
Wyckham Stream	Liffey	4th	-	Left	SW of Dundrum, and formerly boosted by an offtake from the Little Dargle	To the Slang, south of Dundrum		
Muckross Stream	Liffey	3rd	-	Left		To Dodder, Simmonscourt		
Swan River; Swan Water	Liffey	3rd	-	Left	Towards Kimmage	To the Dodder, above London Bridge near Irishtown		
Elm Park Stream		1st	-	-	Goatstown	Merrion Strand (South Bull)		
Trimleston Stream; St. Helen's Stream		1st	-	-	SW of St. Helen's	Booterstown		
Nutley Stream		1st	-	-	Clonskeagh	Williamstown		Previously first stream south of Liffey / Dodder, coming to sea by Sandymount Martello Tower
Priory Stream		1st	-	-	E Stillorgan	Blackrock Park		
Carysfort-Maretimo Stream; Glaslower		1st	-	-	Sandyford	Maretimo		
Monkstown Stream; Rochestown Stream; Carrickbrennan Stream; Mickey Brien's Stream; Drayton Stream		1st	-	-	Rochestown	West Pier, Dun Laoghaire Harbour		
Glasthule; O'Toole's Stream		1st	-	-	Between Rochestown and Glenageary	Scotsman's Bay		
Kill o'the Grange Stream	Kill o'the Grange	1st	-	-	Kill o'the Grange	Killiney Strand		Connected to a surface water drainage diversion going as far as Sandyford Ind. Estate. Studied for GDSDS.
Deansgrange Stream; Clonkeen Stream	Kill o'the Grange	2nd	-	-	Deansgrange	Near Johnstown Road		Sometimes the whole system is called by this name
Shanganagh River	Shanganagh	1st	-	-	Merger of the below rivers and streams, near Cherrywood	Killiney Strand		
Bride's Glen Stream; Loughlinstown River (south or main branch)	Shanganagh	2nd	-	-	Three Rock Mountain	Near Cherrywood		
Loughlinstown River (north or Carrickmines branch)	Shanganagh	2nd	-	-	Merger of the below rivers and streams	Near Cherrywood		
St Bride's Stream; Cabinteely Stream; Foxrock Stream	Shanganagh	3rd	-	-	Foxrock	Cabinteely, meeting with the Carrickmines River		
Carrickmines River	Shanganagh	3rd	-	-	Merger of the below streams	Cabinteely, meeting with Cabinteely Stream		Studied for GDSDS. Previously formed slightly earlier, with Racecourse Stream meeting Ballyogan Stream, and then that Carrickmines River being joined by Glenamuck - the current setup was made during M50 work.
Racecourse Stream	Shanganagh	4th	-	-	Between Leopardstown and Murphystown Roads	Carrickmines, meeting with Ballyogan Stream		
Ballyogan Stream; Kilgobbin Stream	Shanganagh	4th	-	-	Three Rock Mountain	Carrickmines, meeting with Racecourse Stream		
Glenamuck Stream	Shanganagh	5th	-	-		Ballyogan, to Ballyogan Stream		Used to join Carrickmines River directly, not via Ballyogan Stream (before the SE Motorway section of the M50).
Golf Stream	Shanganagh	6th	-	-	Jamestown	To Glenamuck Stream		
Crinken Stream		1st	-	-	Rathmichael	N of Bray		
Glencullen River (part) Cookstown River; Irish: Abhainn Ghleann Cuilinn	Dargle (Wicklow)	2nd	-	Right	Glendoo / Glencullen	To Dargle, near Bray		
Middle Brook	Dargle (Wicklow)	3rd	-	Right	Glendoo Mountain	To Glencullen		
Brockey Stream; Glasnabrockey	Dargle (Wicklow)	3rd	-	Right	Ballynabrockey	To Glencullen, by Glencullen Bridge		

== See also ==
- Rivers of Ireland
- List of rivers of Ireland
- List of Dublin bridges and tunnels
