= Shanganagh River =

River in County Dublin, Ireland

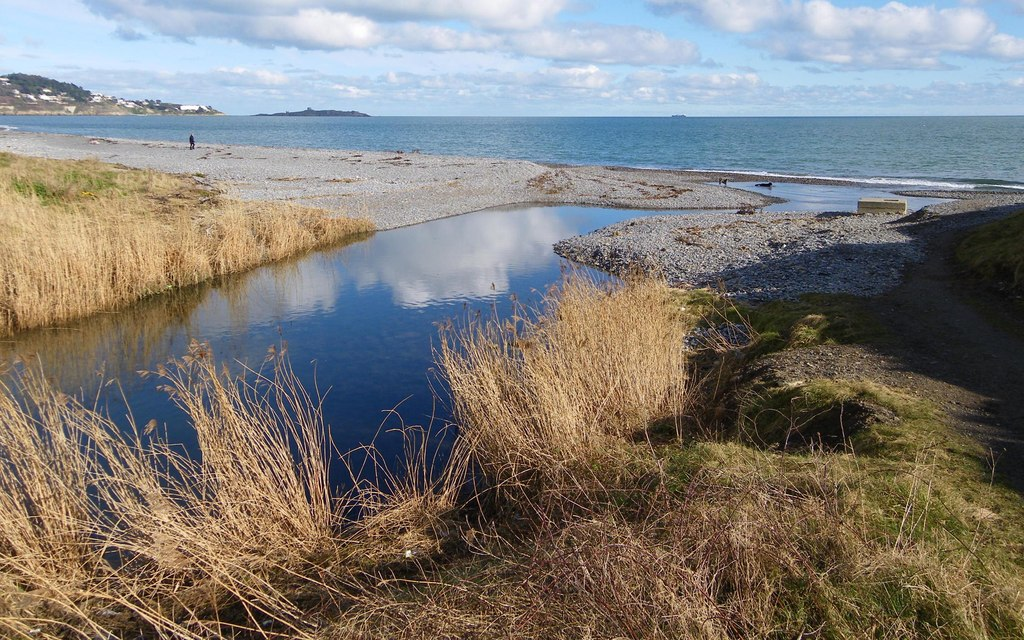
- Mouth of the Shanganagh River on Killiney Strand

Physical characteristics
- Source
  - location: Three Rock Mountain
  - coordinates: 53.2415 N, 6.2328 W
- 2nd source
  - location: Foxrock
  - coordinates: 53.267 N, 6.113 W
- 3rd source
  - coordinates: 53.249 N, 6.232 W
- Mouth: Killiney Strand, Shanganagh, County Dublin
  - coordinates: 53°14′46″N 6°10′41″W

Basin features
- River system: Shanganagh River
- Tributaries
  - left: Loughlinstown River (and in turn Carrickmines River and St Bride's or Cabinteely Stream)
  - right: Bride's Glen Stream (main line)

The Shanganagh River is the largest watercourse system in Dún Laoghaire–Rathdown (in south County Dublin). It has two main source lines, one from Three Rock Mountain, one with multiple sources between Three Rock and Foxrock, and its components pass through many suburbs of Dublin; it ultimately reaches the sea at Killiney beach. The river is in the jurisdiction of Dún Laoghaire–Rathdown County Council, as well as within the purview of the Environmental Protection Agency.

== Course ==
The small river has two principal source lines, the Bride's Glen Stream from Three Rock Mountain and the multiple components of the Carrickmines and northern Loughlinstown Rivers.

The Three Rock Mountain source of the river begins as Bride's Glen Stream in the townland of Ballyedmonduff, with small inflows near Kilternan Abbey, and what may be a former millrace near the former Ballycorus Lead Mines complex. It runs along one side, and then the other, of Bride's Glen Road, passing under the M50 orbital motorway, and then runs along by Cherrywood Road to its confluence with the northern Loughlinstown River in forested land just east of the N11 road.

The northern Loughlinstown River forms from multiple streams, rising in an arc from Foxrock to Three Rock Mountain. The easternmost of these, St Bride's or Cabinteely Stream, rises from two sources near Westminster Road in Foxrock, the longest line within Foxrock Golf Course, the other between Hainault Road and Plunket Avenue. It flows in culvert through Foxrock, surfacing at Glen Lawn Drive in Cornelscourt, and runs openly through Cabinteely; it is a central feature of Cabinteely Park. After continuing through undeveloped land in Brennanstown, it merges with the Carrickmines River in Lehaunstown, just west of the N11.

The Carrickmines River develops from the confluence of the Racecourse Stream from Leopardstown and the Ballyogan Stream from the northern face of Three Rock Mountain. Forming between Ballyogan Grove and Glenamuck Road, the Carrickmines runs through the area of the same name, meeting a southern tributary as it enters Lehaunstown. One branch of the Ballyogan Stream passes through the Fernhill Gardens public park, while tributaries come from Kilgobbin. Glenamuck Stream, the course of which was altered in the building of the M50 motorway, nowadays flows into the Ballyogan in Carrickmines; it has a small tributary, the Golf Stream, from Jamestown.

The combined Shanganagh River flows through Loughlinstown Commons and along Commons Road, where it sometimes causes flooding, and passes a water processing plant after going under the railway line. It enters the sea at Killiney Beach, north of Shanganagh Cliffs.

== Flooding and flood management ==
A flood management project was launched in 2021, covering the Carrickmines-Shanganagh catchment, with the local authority engaging consultant engineers to study the combined catchment and propose improvement plans.

== Oversight ==
The river flows within the jurisdiction of Dún Laoghaire–Rathdown County Council. It is within the purview of the Environmental Protection Agency and, formally, Inland Fisheries Ireland.

== See also ==
- List of rivers of County Dublin
