= Mayne River =

Small watercourse in County Dublin, Ireland

Mayne River Irish: Abhainn na Maighne

Physical characteristics
- Source
  - location: near Dublin Airport
- Mouth: Baldoyle Bay
  - location: near Baldoyle
  - coordinates: 53°24′34″N 6°08′10″W

Basin features
- Tributaries
  - right: Turnapin Stream, Grange Stream

The Mayne River (Irish: Abhainn na Maighne), is a small watercourse of northern County Dublin. It forms from the merger of the Cuckoo and Turnapin Streams, which rise near Dublin Airport and help drain the airport campus. The river is in the jurisdiction of Fingal County Council and within the oversight of the Environmental Protection Agency.

== Course ==
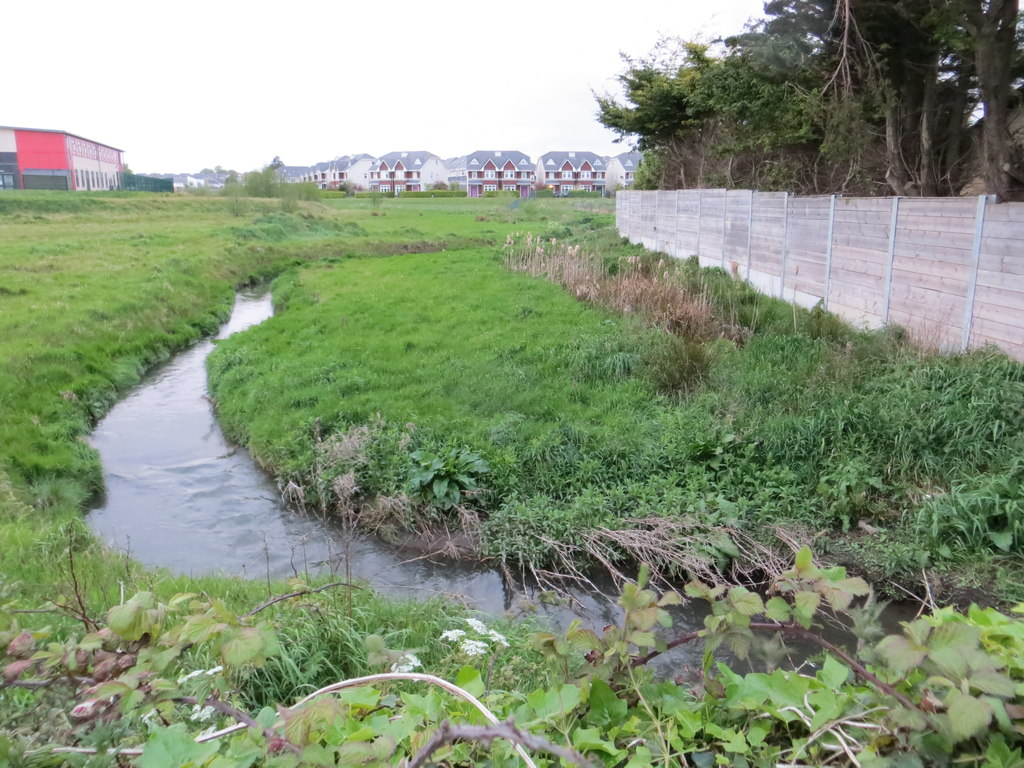
Mayne River from Balgriffin to Donaghmede

The Mayne River (also sometimes the Maine or Moyne) forms from two streams, the Cuckoo and the Turnapin. The Cuckoo Stream, the most significant drainage channel for Dublin Airport, is the bigger and longer source, rising in the Dunbro area and passing from airport lands to cross the old Swords Road and the M1 motorway and enter Balgriffin. It passes both Balgriffin and Fingal cemeteries, and takes in two small tributaries. Turnapin Stream rises in Harristown, passes through Dardistown, receiving two small tributaries, traverses the interchange of the M1 and M50 motorways, and crosses from Clonshaugh to Belcamp. The Turnapin flows through the former Belcamp estate, where it receives smaller watercourses, and enters Balgriffin, where it merges with the Cuckoo Stream. The Mayne passes under the Dublin-Belfast railway line at the Red Arches bridge and enters the former Baldoyle Racecourse lands. The Grange Stream flows in near the coast, and the Mayne goes on to reach Baldoyle Bay by way of Mayne Bridge, between Baldoyle and Portmarnock.

== Fauna ==
Stickleback and eels have been found in the river.

== See also ==
- List of rivers of County Dublin
