= Broadmeadow Viaduct =

Rail bridge near Dublin, Ireland

Broadmeadow viaduct
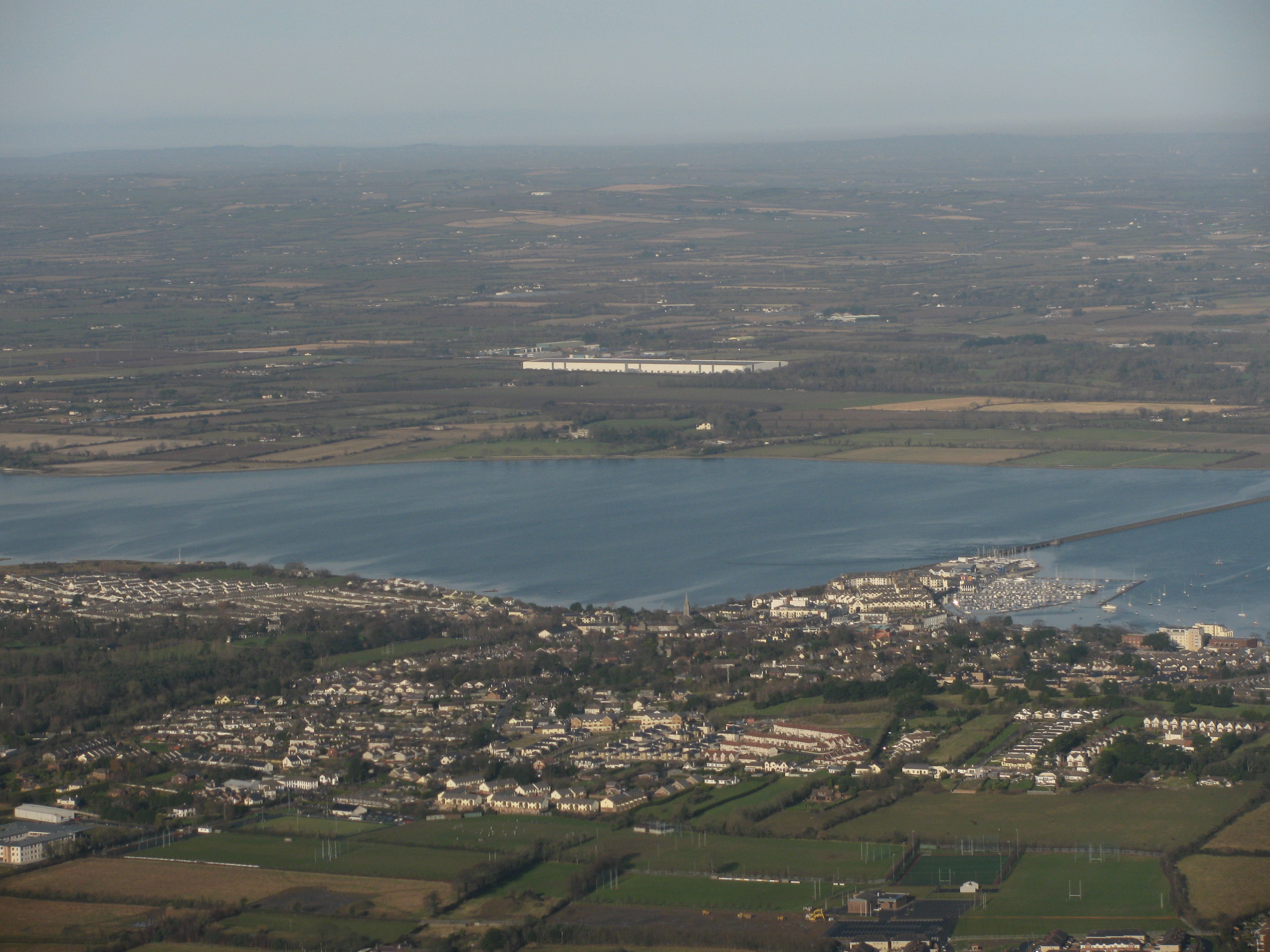
- Broadmeadow Estuary (bridge at right)
- Coordinates: 53.4580°N 6.1555°W
- Carries: Dublin – Belfast railway
- Crosses: Broadmeadow Estuary, from the Broadmeadow River
- Locale: Malahide, Ireland

Characteristics
- Material: Stone piers & prestressed concrete spans
- Total length: 180 metres (590 ft)
- Piers in water: 11

Location
- Interactive map of Broadmeadow viaduct

The Broadmeadow viaduct is a rail bridge carrying the main Dublin to Belfast railway across the estuary of the Broadmeadow River, about 13 kilometres north of Dublin, Ireland. Just north of Malahide village, it is approximately 180 metres (590 ft) long and is a section of a longer crossing constructed as an embankment. The viaduct carries around ninety trains, including commuter services and heavy freight, per day and it is the sole rail route between Dublin and Belfast. It has had a history of problems with its foundations being scoured out by strong currents.

== History ==
The present structure is the third on this site. The first was built in 1844, in timber, for the Dublin and Drogheda Railway. Its stability was badly affected by erosion of the river bed around the piles and, after short-term remedial work, it was replaced in 1860 with a new structure of wrought iron spans on masonry piers. This sufficed until the early 1930s when new locomotives (4-4-0 Compounds) required strengthening of the piers and continued maintenance. Additional ballasting of the piers was also needed. The sea air caused deterioration of the wrought iron and these spans were replaced during 1966–1968 with the current prestressed concrete structure. At this time, the tracks were re-laid on ballast, reflecting modern practice.

During the Irish Civil War the viaduct was blown up by the Anti-Treaty IRA on 20 January 1923 in order to hinder the movements of the Free State Army.

=== Collapse (2009) ===
==== Incident ====
On Friday 21 August 2009, at 6:30pm, a 20-metre section of the viaduct collapsed. Some reports state that the collapse started while a passenger train was on it, others say that it occurred shortly after. The driver of the Balbriggan to Dublin (Pearse) service was on the viaduct and noticed the section crumbling away. Engine revs were stopped while the DMU was on the viaduct to decrease vibrations that could cause collapse. The train remained on the tracks, no one was injured, and the driver averted disaster when after making contact within 7 seconds of spotting the collapse and- within 15 seconds of the first visuals all signals were made red and this greatly prevented what could have been a national tragedy. The repairs took about three months, causing curtailment of all services north of Malahide while engineers came up with a plan to completely rebuild the washed away Pier 4. Additional piles were placed in all existing piers that reach down into the bedrock, providing the expanse with an improved foundation, more than doubling its projected life span and meeting the ever-growing demands of a large population. With the addition of more corrosion-resistant building materials, the bridge is now expected to be around for generations to come.

The competence of Iarnród Éireann's maintenance regime has been questioned and there have been previous critical reports of the viaduct's structure. Iarnród Éireann stated that the structure had been inspected three days previously. Erosion had been reported by an Irish Sea Scout leader who later opined that a superficial inspection might have missed scour damage below water level.

Official estimates of three months to repair the viaduct (by reinforcing the seabed and replacing the collapsed pier) and restore rail services were accurate and Iarnród Éireann announced that the bridge would reopen on 16 November after "round the clock" repair works that reportedly cost €4 million. The bridge reopened on the scheduled date. Other piers have been strengthened and the riverbed weir restored. This is despite much more pessimistic unattributable comments by structural engineers shortly after the collapse. Such pessimism arose because the estuary is a Special Area of Conservation (SAC) and a Special Protection Area (SPA) and it was suggested that a full environmental impact statement (EIS) would be necessary and, if a planning application were required, obtaining the necessary permissions alone could take more than three months. In addition, the stability of the remaining structure needs to be proven. A long term solution, perhaps a new longer span bridge, will be needed.

==== Independent report ====
An independent report found that spans 4 and 5 of the viaduct began to collapse as the 18.05 Balbriggan to Pearse train crossed the bridge at 18.23. The report said that staff had followed proper procedures. The design of the viaduct meant that the piers did not go down to bedrock but instead joined with a man made causeway underneath, making the structure vulnerable to scour erosion. The causeway between piers 4 and 5 were particularly badly eroded and erosion had increased in part due to climatic, oceanographic and hydrographic factors. Visual checks and inspections had not led to questions about the structural integrity of the viaduct. Access to original construction drawings and historical documents was limited.

==== Repair ====
The replacement pier 4 is founded on piles and the remaining piers were retrofitted with piles.

=== 2020 to present ===
In 2020 permission was granted by Fingal County Council for a 6 km long 'Broadmeadow Greenway' as part of a larger 'Fingal Coastal Way' which will form an additional parallel cycling and pedestrian route along the western embankment of the southern arm of the Broadmeadow viaduct. 13 supplementary concrete piers had been installed alongside the causeway as part of larger repair works following the collapse of the viaduct in 2009 in order to future proof the construction of the greenway and reduce the overall cost.
