= Carrickmines =

Outer suburb of Dublin, Ireland

Carrickmines Carraig Mhaighin (Irish)
- Suburb
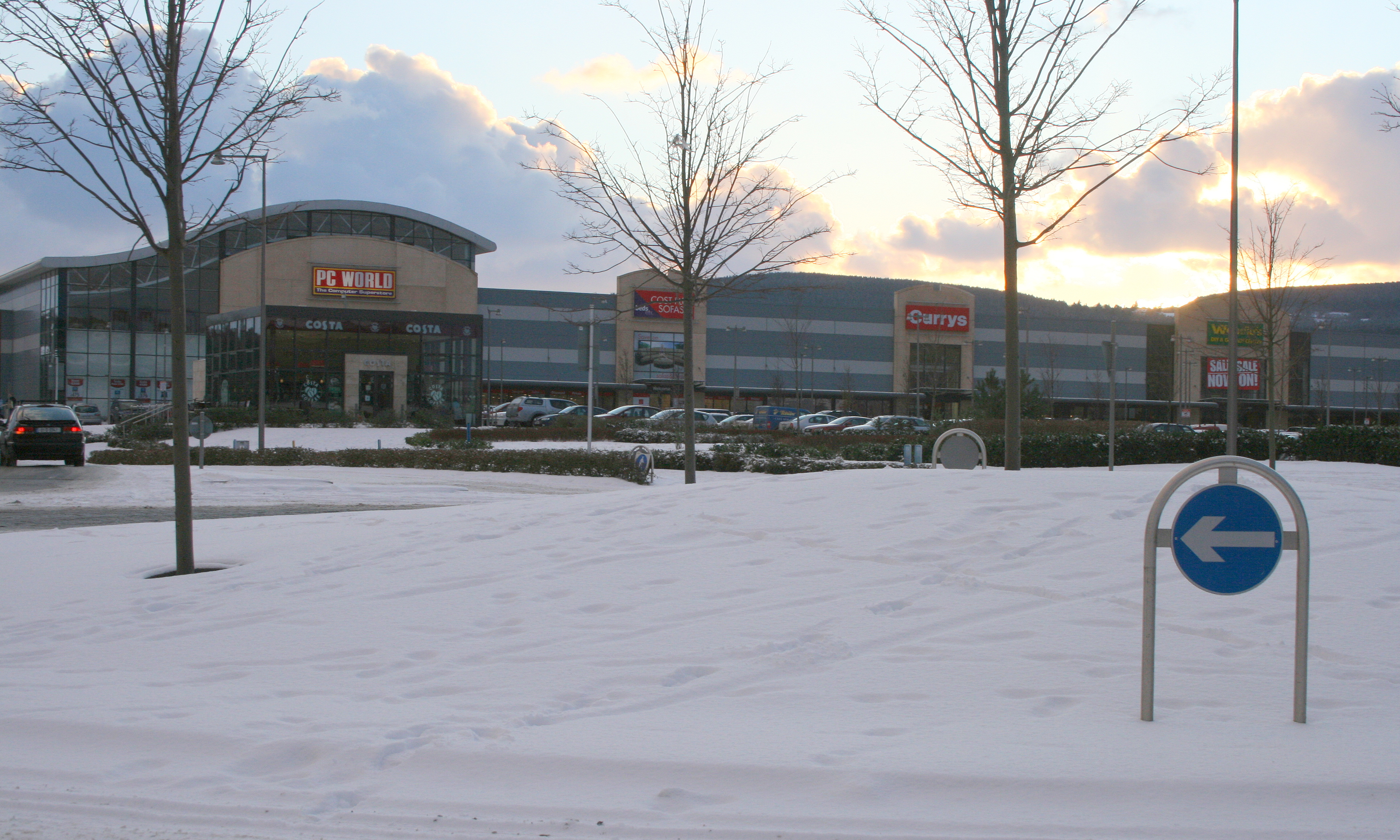
- Carrickmines Retail Park

- Location in Ireland
- Coordinates: 53.248°N 6.181°W
- Country: Ireland
- Province: Leinster
- County: County Dublin
- Local authority: Dún Laoghaire–Rathdown County Council
- Elevation: 130 m (430 ft)

Population (2006)
  - Urban: 6,088
- Eircode routing key: D18
- Area code: 01 (+3531)
- Irish Grid Reference: O236249

Carrickmines (Irish: Carraig Mhaighin, meaning 'Plateau of rock') is an outer suburb of Dublin in Dún Laoghaire–Rathdown, County Dublin, Ireland. The area, still semi-rural, was historically on the border of English control and featured a defensive construction, Carrickmines Castle, which became the subject of national controversy during the building of a late stage of Dublin's M50 orbital motorway.

== Character ==
Previously a rural area, and today a semi-rural suburban region, Carrickmines is now divided northeast–southwest by the M50 motorway, with, to the northeast, more established residential areas, and to the southwest, including along Glenamuck Road, new retail parks, office buildings, housing schemes and apartments.

== Geography ==
Carrickmines developed as a settlement in the more than 6 km long valley of the same name, which contains the modest Carrickmines River and its tributaries. The Ballyogan, Glenamuck and Golf Streams all merge in the vicinity. Downstream at Brennanstown, the river merges with St. Bride's Stream, from Foxrock, to form the Loughlinstown River, which in turn meets the Bride's Glen Stream to form the Shanganagh River, which reaches the sea at Killiney Strand.

Leopardstown lies to the northwest, Foxrock to the north, Cornelscourt and Cabinteely to the northeast and Brennanstown to the east, Ballyogan to the west, Glenamuck and Kilternan to the south, and Laughanstown and Lehaunstown to the southeast.

The proposed Natural Heritage Area of Dingle Glen, a secluded mature broadleaf woodland, lies to the south of Carrickmines.

== History ==
=== Beginnings ===
Carrickmines was founded in the 12th century by the Normans. It was established with a Hiberno-Norse settlement, castle and village, on the frontier between Dublin and Wicklow. Once the settlement found itself on an emerging frontier in the thirteenth and fourteenth centuries, its character, and the lifestyle of its occupants, fundamentally changed.

In 1402 the O'Byrne clan of County Wicklow, who periodically raided Dublin, moved a large mercenary force to the banks of the River Dargle at Bray, but since the direct route to the city would bring them close to the stronghold of Carrickmines, they initially hesitated before attacking. Their delay allowed the Walsh family, who owned Carrickmines, to send an urgent warning to Dublin. The Dubliners responded decisively: the Mayor of Dublin with a large force fell on the O'Byrnes and defeated them, in an encounter popularly known as the Battle of Bloody Bank, due to the number of casualties.

In later years, Carrickmines became a place of farmland and woods, notable for its blackberry bushes which were frequently used by family farmers during the autumn.

=== Carrickminders ===
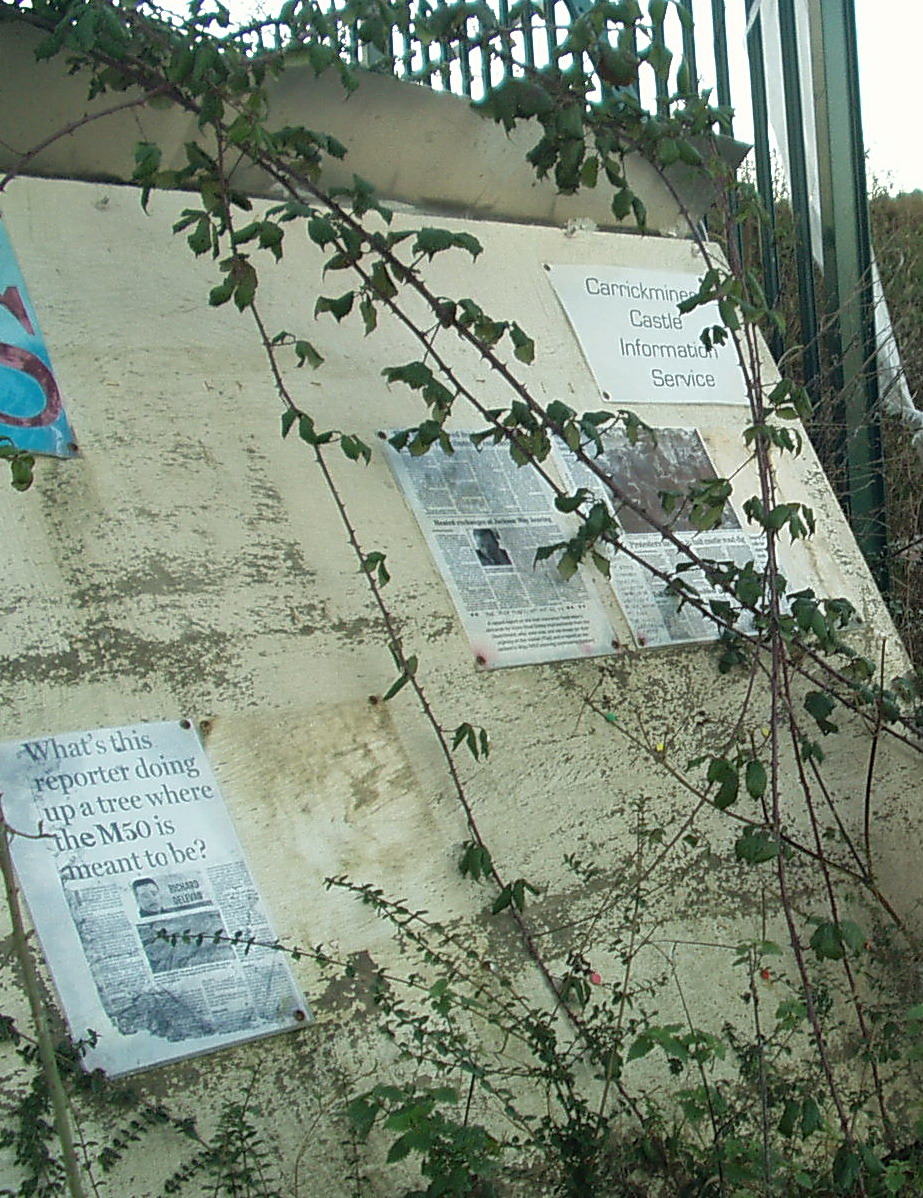
Remains of The Carrickminders camp, January 2004

During the construction of the M50 motorway, Carrickmines gained national notoriety when anti-roads protesters calling themselves the Carrickminders set up camp in the area and delayed the completion of the M50 for two years with legal challenges being taken by Vincent Salafia. The objectors claimed that the underground remains of Carrickmines Castle, an Anglo-Norman fort built in the 12th century on the edge of the Pale, was of national importance. Today, much of the uncovered remains are preserved in tunnels and other structures scattered around the interchange. Dún Laoghaire–Rathdown County Council claimed the action greatly increased the cost of the project, which was eventually completed in August 2005.

=== Development ===
Junction 15 of the M50 lies at the centre of Carrickmines. The retail park and developments on Glenamuck Road have converted the previously semi-rural area into a mix of suburban complexes, with shops, offices, apartment blocks and housing estates, and a patchwork of remaining farmland. The retail park, The Park Carrickmines, contains a mixture of retail and office space. It was sold for €100m in 2006, and reportedly garnered the highest retail park rents in Ireland in 2014. In 2015 it was reported as the best performing Irish retail park by The Sunday Times.

=== 2015 fire ===
On 10 October 2015, a large fire swept through a halting site on Glenamuck Road.

== Transport ==
Carrickmines railway station originally lay on the Dublin and South Eastern Railway's Harcourt Street line to Bray. It opened on 10 July 1854 and later served the nearby tennis and croquet club until its closure on 1 January 1959 when CIÉ mothballed the Harcourt Street line. The station building became a private residence and was extended over the former trackbed. This extension was removed in 2009 to make way for the Luas extension to Cherrywood.

Carrickmines Luas stop opened on 16 July 2010 on the Green Line's extension from Sandyford down to Brides Glen in Cherrywood. It lies in the northeast of the settlement behind the former railway station and has a park and ride facility. It is also served by regular Go-Ahead L26 services which pass through Carrickmines on their route from Blackrock to Kilternan.

== Cultural references ==
Carrickmines is mentioned in James Joyce's novel A Portrait of the Artist as a Young Man, in which it is described as an area dominated by fields. It also appears in the 1961 film Johnny Nobody.

== See also ==
- List of towns and villages in Ireland
