= Carrickmines Castle =

Former castle in Ireland

Coordinates: 53.253292°N 6.175398°W

Carrickmines Castle is an archaeological site in Carrickmines, County Dublin, in eastern Ireland. The castle was built in the Middle Ages to protect the English-ruled Pale around Dublin. The mostly subsurface ruins lay in the path of the M50 motorway, completed in 2005. Sections of the medieval walls and some sections of the castle's defensive structures were preserved within or under M50 roundabouts.

== History ==
=== Early period ===
Carrickmines Castle is a remnant of the site of a Hiberno-Norse settlement which during the 12th century became a fortified Norman castle and village, on the frontier between Dublin and Wicklow, Ireland. Guarding the southern plains, this fortress was once a central "medallion" in the necklace of the Norman castles and outposts dotted along the outskirts of The Pale – the area around Dublin under English rule during the medieval period.

In 1402, the O'Byrne clan of County Wicklow, who periodically raided Dublin, moved a large mercenary force to the banks of the River Dargle at Bray, but, as the direct route to the city would bring them close to the stronghold of Carrickmines, they apparently hesitated before attacking. The delay allowed the Walsh family, who owned Carrickmines, to send an urgent warning to Dublin. The Dubliners responded decisively: the Mayor of Dublin with a large force fell on the O'Byrnes and defeated them, in an encounter popularly known as the Battle of Bloody Bank, due to the number of casualties.

As a major fortification, the castle had an extensive curtain wall flanked by towers protecting an area of some acres. Within this was a settlement with a variety of wooden and stone buildings, mills, and a keep or hall house in the centre. The site still contains impressive defences, hewn into bedrock, and human remains from when the castle was overwhelmed in 1642. In the Irish Rebellion of 1641, the Catholic Walshs, who owned the castle, sided with the native Irish and the Confederate attempt to create the first independent Irish parliament. They paid dearly – as a focus of the Irish Confederate Wars, the castle was besieged by English forces, and when it was retaken, over 300 of the Walsh, O'Byrne, and O'Tooles were massacred.

=== M50 motorway and the "Carrickminders" ===
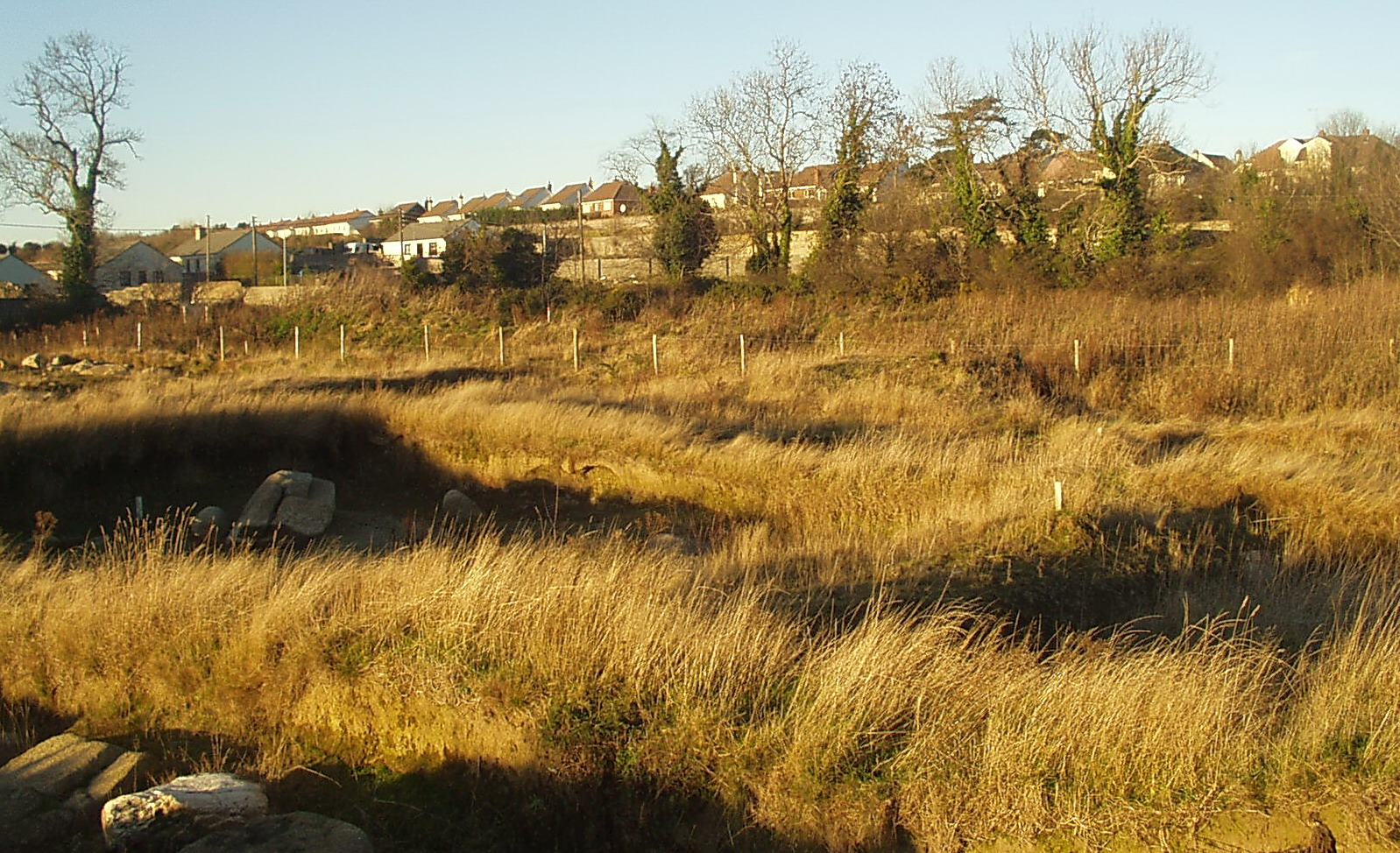
The site prior to the building of the M50.

The ruins of the castle were the subject of a long-running dispute before the M50 motorway was built through the site. It began in 2002 when activists, including Vincent Salafia and Gordon Lucas, who called themselves the "Carrickminders", camped out on the castle's ruins to prevent them from being removed to make way for the motorway. They were joined by preservationists, including Professor Sean Duffy, Head of the Department of History at Trinity College Dublin (TCD), and Dr. Mark Clinton, who was the archaeologist employed by the National Roads Authority (NRA) as Site Director. They argued that the site's potential for historical study had not been fully realised. They questioned why the line of the M50 was rerouted through the castle site in 1998 when the proposed new road had originally been routed around it in 1983, on the advice of a state agency.

In 2005, both the M50 motorway and the junction were completed.

==== Supreme Court ruling ====
The Supreme Court, according to a report in The Irish Times on 26 July 2006, unanimously upheld the constitutionality of new laws affecting the preservation of the Carrickmines Castle site. While noting that the new legislation – Section 8 of the National Monuments (Amendment) Act 2004 – "removes a bundle of protections" from national monuments, the five-judge court found the Oireachtas is not prohibited under the Constitution of Ireland from enacting such laws.

The Court found that in issuing directions, the Minister for the Environment, Heritage and Local Government was entitled to balance the benefits of archaeological preservation against the wider public interest that would accrue as a result of the road development. Section 8 effectively provided that the works affecting the Carrickmines Castle site were to be carried out on the Minister's directions. Provided the Minister exercised his discretion under section 8 in a constitutional manner, he could give such directions as he thought fit, the Court found. This effectively meant that the road works at Carrickmines Castle were no longer to be regulated under the National Monuments Acts, the court said, although the castle was accepted as being a national monument and the works would mean a large part of a moat discovered at the site would cease to exist.

Under section 8, Dún Laoghaire–Rathdown County Council, as landowner, did not need consent from any statutory body for undertaking the works and Oireachtas approval was not necessary. There was also no requirement to obtain a licence under the 1930 National Monuments Act and An Bord Pleanála was precluded from considering whether proposed works were likely to have a significant effect on the environment and from directing an environmental impact statement. There was "only the requirement that the works be carried out on the directions of the minister", the court said. It rejected claims that those directions – issued by the Minister, Dick Roche, in August 2004 – breached provisions of European Commission environmental directives and were therefore null and void. The Supreme Court was delivering its judgement on an appeal against the High Court's rejection in September 2004 of a challenge by Dominic Dunne, both to section 8 and to the ministerial directions. Dunne indicated that he intended to take his case to the European Court of Justice.

==== NRA Preservation Plan ====
The NRA proposed a solution which they said would preserve extensive areas of the unique historical remains while ensuring that the South Eastern Motorway proceeded on schedule. Under the plan, additional sections of medieval walls and some sections of the castle's defensive structures were to be preserved within or under M50 roundabouts. However, An Taisce's demands to decrease the size of one of the roundabouts and adjust the approach roads were not addressed in the plan.

Members of the NRA and Dún Laoghaire–Rathdown County Council claimed that they had done as much as possible to preserve the castle. €6m was spent on excavations over two years and archaeologists had retrieved more than 40,000 artefacts (including weapons, coins, human remains and pottery) when work resumed on the motorway.

==== Corruption allegations ====
On 26 July 2006, the Criminal Assets Bureau (the CAB) successfully obtained a High Court order freezing land assets of 107 acres (43 ha) at Carrickmines, County Dublin, owned by Jackson Way Properties Ltd and preventing their sale. The CAB contended that these lands had been rezoned on 16 December 1997 by Dún Laoghaire–Rathdown County Council from agricultural to industrial after Frank Dunlop bribed and made corrupt payments to councillors to secure their support in the rezoning vote. That vote increased the value of just 17 acres (6.9 ha) of the property from €8 million to €61 million. The CAB interviewed and took statements from Frank Dunlop for use as a witness against a number of property developers.

The lands in question were the subject of an investigation by The Mahon Tribunal in 2003 and 2004.

== Photo gallery ==
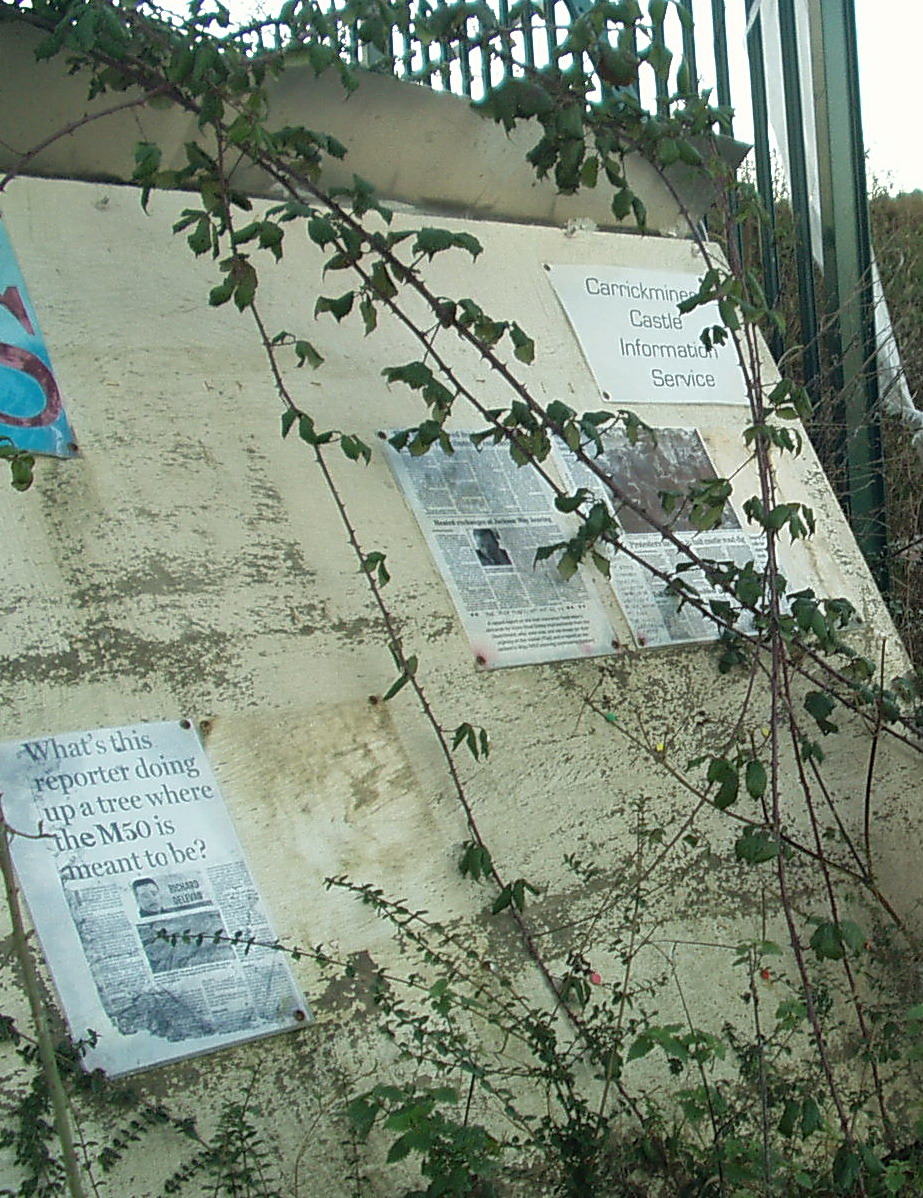
Remains of the Carrickminders' camp, January 2004

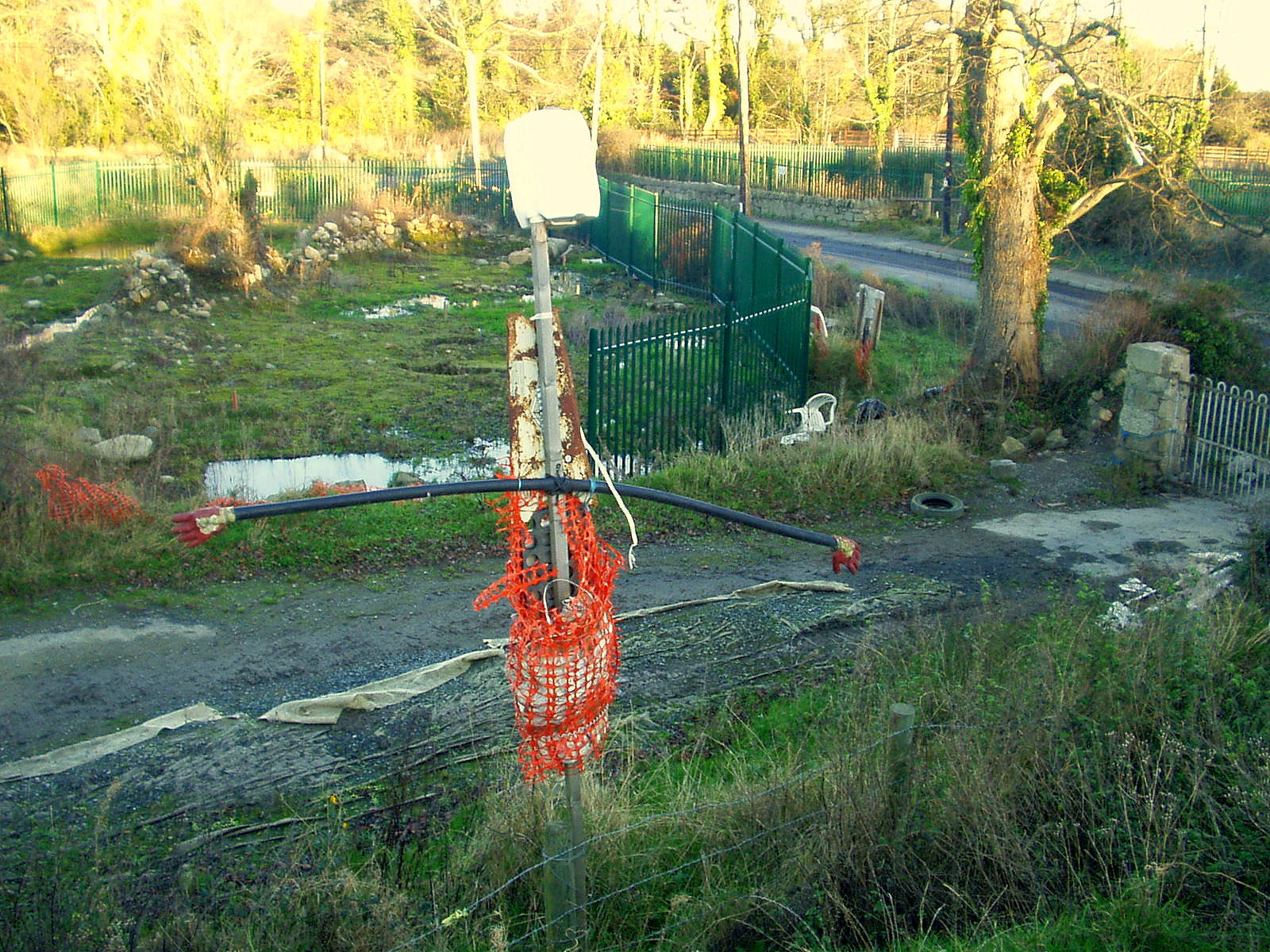
Minding the Carrickminders

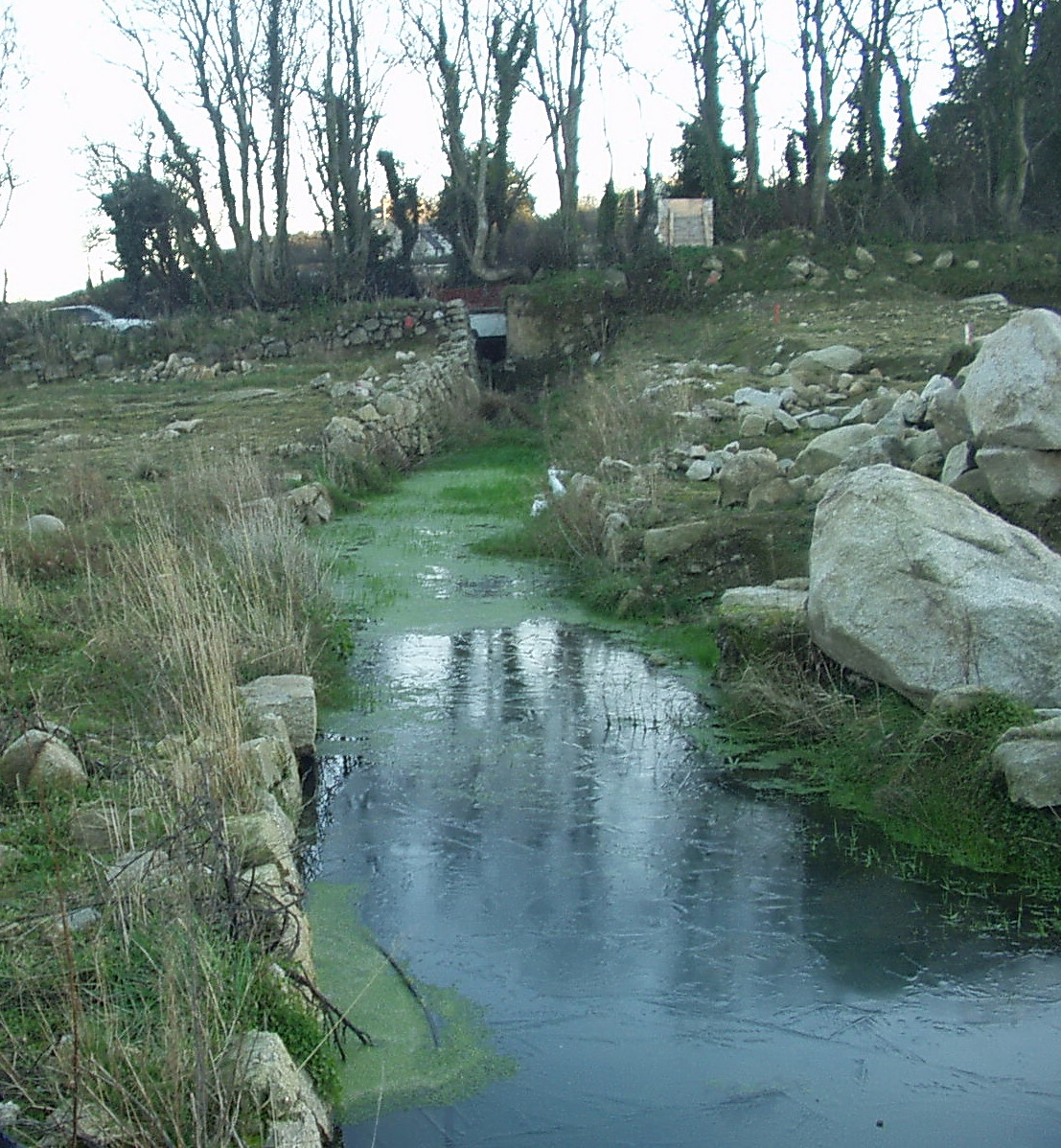
Water feature discovered
