= Ballyedmonduff Wedge Tomb =

Wedge-shaped gallery grave in Ireland

- Tuama Dingeach Bhaile Éamainn Duibh
- Giant’s Grave
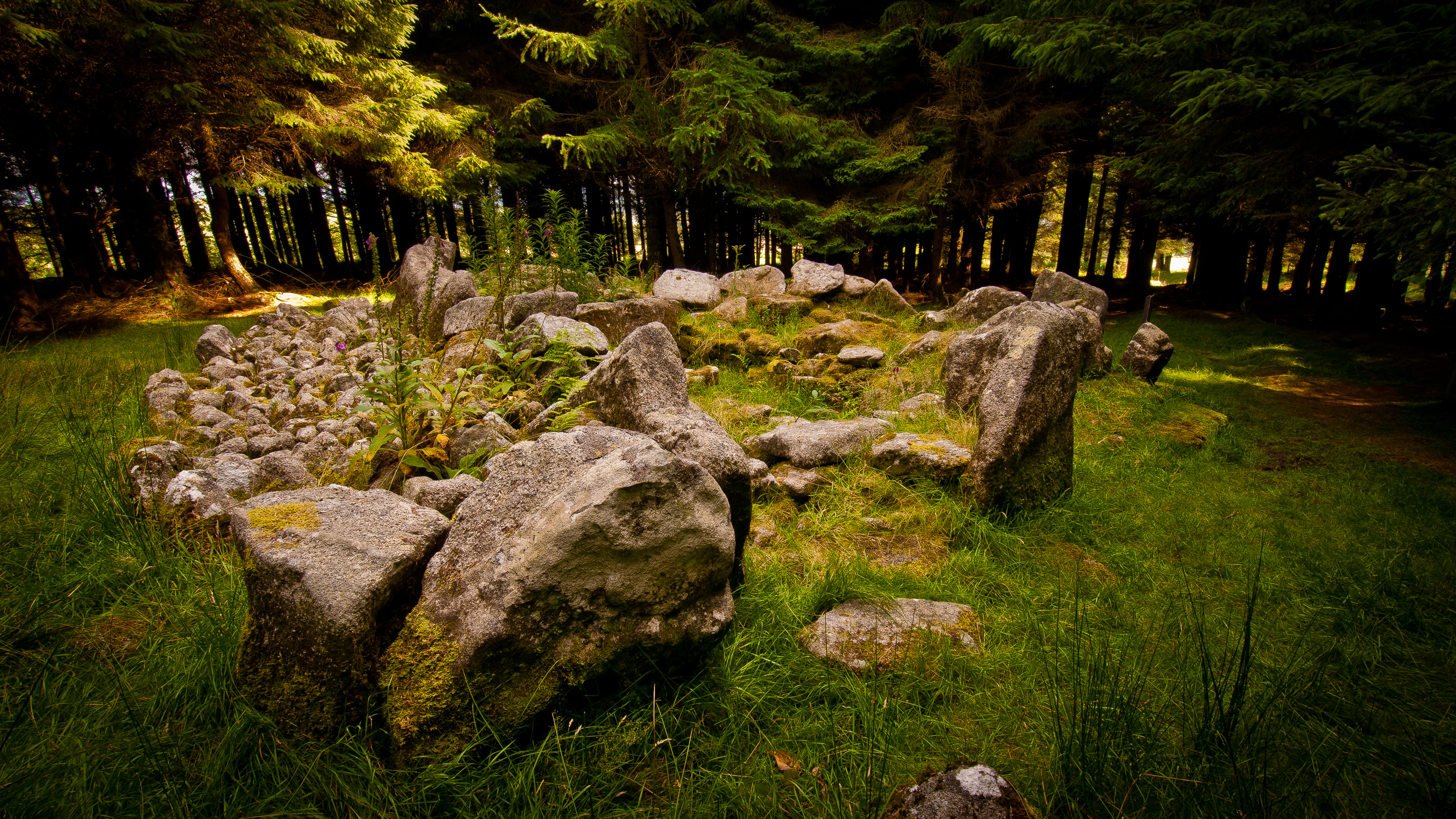
- The wedge tomb in 2010

- Location in Ireland
- 53.229074°N 6.226310°W
- Type: Wedge tomb
- Location: Glencullen, Dún Laoghaire–Rathdown, Ireland

History
- Built: c. 1700 BC

Site notes
- Material: Stone
- Height: 1.83 m (6.0 ft)

National monument of Ireland
- Official name: Ballyedmonduff
- Reference no.: 437

The Ballyedmonduff Wedge Tomb is a wedge-shaped gallery grave and a National Monument in Dún Laoghaire–Rathdown, Ireland.

== Location ==
Ballyedmonduff Wedge Tomb is found on the south-eastern slope of the Two Rock mountain. Ongoing replanting and an expansion of mountain biking in the area by Glencullen Adventure Park has removed all the surrounding trees. Access is available through the Glencullen Adventure Park walking trails which are part of the Dublin Mountains Way. Mountain bike trails run within 15 feet of the national monument.

== History ==
This is an early Bronze Age wedge tomb, around 1700 BC, and was situated in a small clearing in a planted forest before the trees surrounding it were cut down in 2020.

The tomb was excavated in the 1830s and then again in the 1940s; during this excavation, cremated bone, a polished stone hammer, flints and pottery were found. The tomb is U-shaped and features double-walling; the rectangular chamber is divided into three parts.

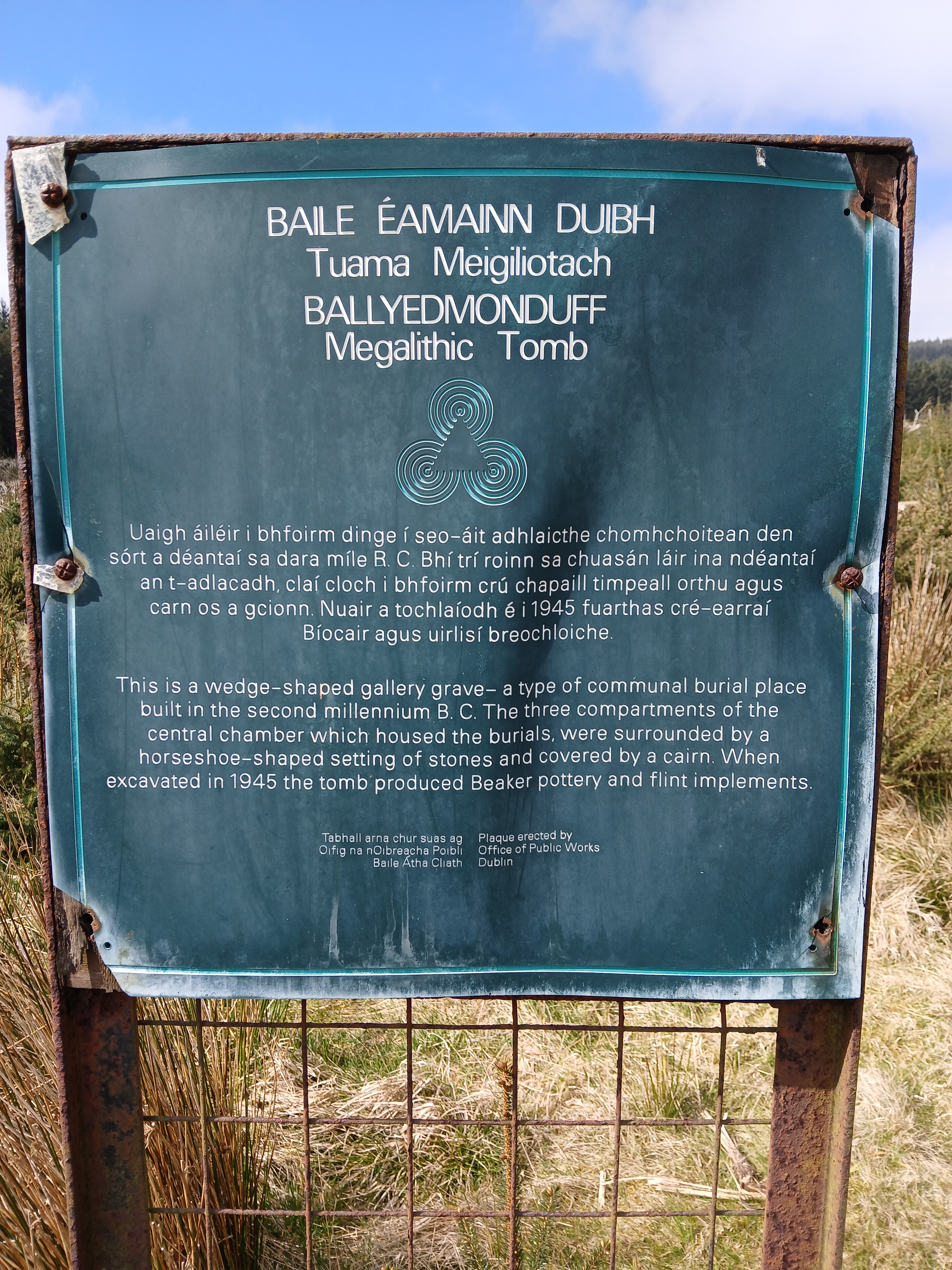
Information board at the site
