= Vincent Salafia =

Irish lawyer and environmentalist

Vincent Salafia is an Irish lawyer and environmentalist. Salafia was involved in a legal challenge against Dick Roche, Minister for the Environment, Heritage and Local Government over the M3 Motorway at Tara in 2006.

== Brehon Law Project ==
In 2000 he founded the Brehon Law Project, to promote academic study into early Irish law or 'Brehon Law'. He held three symposia in Blackhall Place, King's Inns and Trinity College Dublin.

== Carrickmines Castle ==
In 2002 Salafia became a spokesperson for a group called Carrickminders, which engaged in a campaign to preserve the remains of Carrickmines Castle, an Anglo-Norman fort built in the 12th century on the edge of the Pale. An occupation lasting 6 months led to the declaration that Carrickmines Castle was a National Monument and the granting of a Supreme Court injunction that postponed the completion of the M50 motorway for two years. The Government refused to reroute the motorway and facilitated its construction by passing the National Monuments (Amendment) Act 2004.

== Hill of Tara / M3 motorway ==
Salafia undertook judicial review of the decision of the Minister to give directions, under the National Monuments Act 2004, to proceed with excavations of 38 sites between Navan and Dunshaughlin along the pathway of the M3 motorway. On 1 March 2006 Justice Thomas Smyth ruled against Salafia in the High Court. Salafia faced a legal bill of €600,000.

The National Roads Authority have claimed that Salafia's objections have cost the taxpayers of Ireland millions of euros, with the delays costing €1 million per week . He has also been accused by the National Roads Authority of "endangering the public" because the new motorway will separate traffic and save lives. Salafia has denied these claims both in court and in the media.
