= Balally =

Balally Baile Amhlaoibh (Irish)
- Suburb
- Location in Dublin
- Coordinates: 53°16′48″N 6°13′55″W
- Country: Ireland
- Province: Leinster
- County: County Dublin

Area
  - Total: 17 km^{2} (6.6 sq mi)
- Time zone: UTC+0 (WET)
  - Summer (DST): UTC-1 (IST (WEST))
- Eircode routing key: D14, D16

Balally (Irish: Baile Amhlaoibh, meaning 'Olafs' Town') is a townland and residential area in County Dublin, Ireland.

Situated between Dundrum and Sandyford, Balally parish itself reaches from Ardglas to the M50 motorway. The area is served by two primary schools (St. Olaf's National School and Queen of Angels) and two secondary schools (St. Tiernan's and Wesley College). Balally is part of the conurbation of Greater Dublin, in the council area of Dún Laoghaire–Rathdown. The area contains a Luas tram station, located near the southern entrance to the new Dundrum Town Centre.

== Name and location ==
Balally townland is in the civil parish of Taney in the barony of Rathdown. The townland's Irish name, Baile Amhlaoibh, derives from a reputed association with Olaf (Amhlaoibh or "Olave"), the first king of Viking Dublin, who reputedly built a fort in the area. Baile Amhlaoibh, meaning "the town of Olaf", was anglicised as Balally.

The first recorded building in the area is from a record of 1280 when John de Walhope was granted 7 oak trees from the royal forest at Glencree to build a house. A later castle, built by William Walsh after 1407, was constructed on or near the site of this house.

Balally is located at the foot of the Wicklow Mountains and was originally farmland. It now includes several residential roads, including Balally Drive, Balally Hill, Balally Grove, Balally Close, Balally Park, Balally Avenue, Balally Road, and Sandyford Road. It is connected to Sandyford Road at Balally Hill.

== Amenities ==
The local primary school, St. Olaf's National School, had an enrollment of more than 480 pupils as of 2018. The Church of the Ascension of the Lord, the local Roman Catholic church, was built in October 1982.

Balally Residents Association has been in existence since 1964.

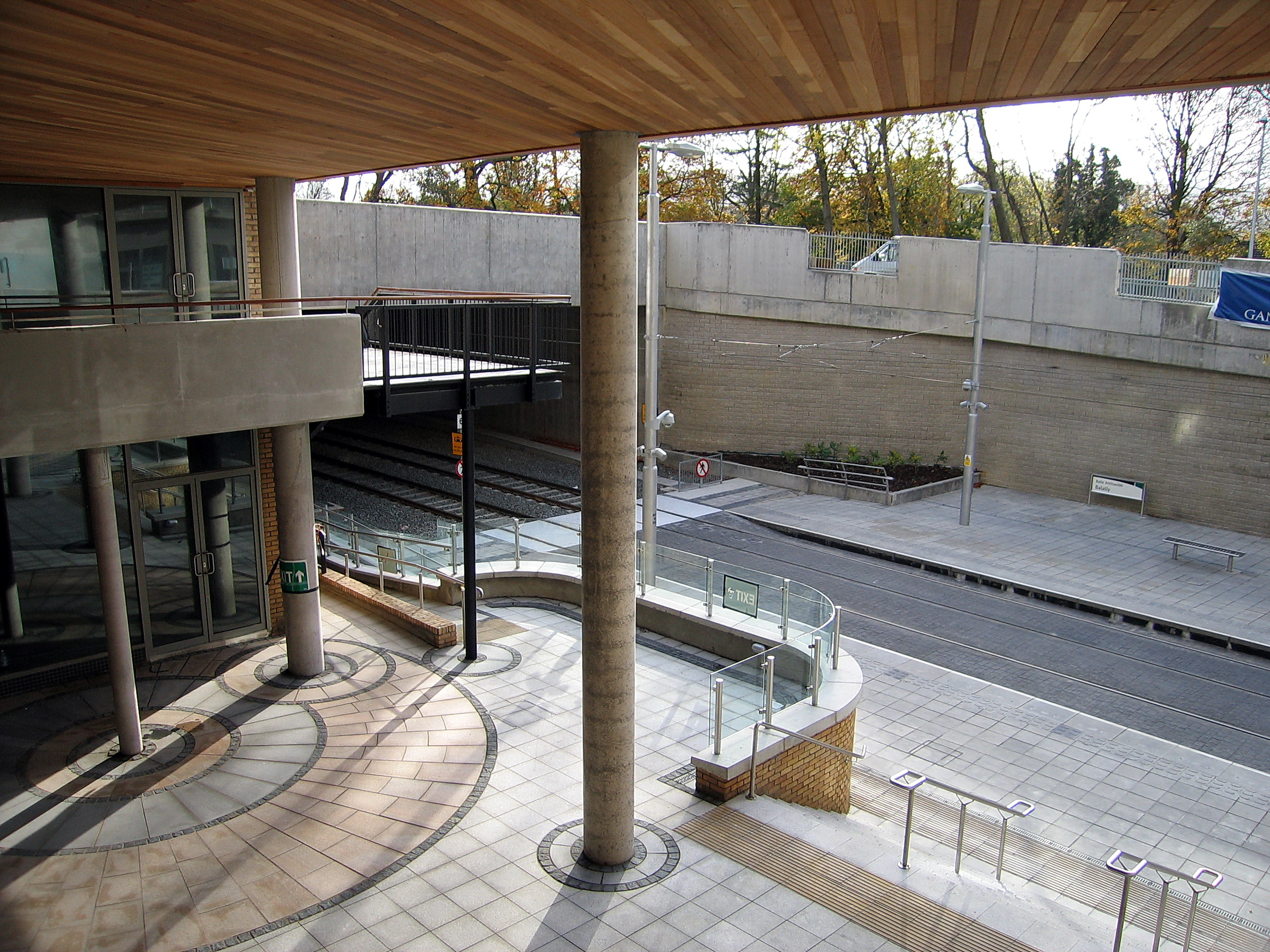
Balally Luas stop

== Transport ==
Balally is served by bus route numbers 44, 44B and 116. The 44 travels on to Enniskerry in the south and Larkhill to the north and runs seven days a week. The 44B service operates on weekdays between Dundrum and Glencullen. The 116 also serves the area, as do routes S8 and L25, which have replaced the former 75 since 26 November 2023.

Balally Luas stop is a stop on the Luas light rail system's green line. It connects the suburb to Brides Glen stop in the south and the city centre and Broombridge station in the North.

Some proposals for the Dublin Metro, also known as Metrolink, proposed a station alongside Ballaly's Luas stop on its way from Swords to Sandyford. However, as of February 2019, it was questioned whether this section of the line would be completed as originally proposed.

== Sport ==
Naomh Olaf is the local Gaelic Athletic Association club and Balally Celtic is the local association football club.
