= John McCann =

John McCann may refer to:

- Jack McCann (1910–1972), British politician
- John McCann (footballer, born 1934) (1934–2020), Scottish former professional footballer
- John McCann (footballer, born 1867) (1867–1944), Scottish footballer
- John P. McCann (born 1952), cartoon writer and producer
- John Paul McCann (1879–1952), British/Irish polo player, competed in the 1908 Summer Olympics
- John McCann (Irish politician) (1905–1980), Irish Fianna Fáil politician from Dublin
- John McCann, member of the Winchester Three
