= Marianne Agren-McElroy =

Swedish artist in Ireland (1900–2006)

- Born: 1900; Lidingö, Sweden
- Died: 2006 (aged 105–106)
- Occupation(s): Poet, sculptor
- Spouse: Paddy McElroy
- Children: 2

Marianne Ågren McElroy (1900–2006) was a sculptor and poet. She was born in Lidingö in Sweden and travelled to Ireland in 1950. She studied at the National College of Art. She had two daughters, artist Kristina and Ingrid. Her husband was metal worker Paddy McElroy, whom she met at the Dublin School of Art. She had her own ceramic studio in Churchtown, Dublin, from 1965.

== Biography ==
Ågren McElroy was born in 1900 and she came to Ireland in 1958, not planning to stay longer than 12 months.

== Career ==
She was a member of The Project Gallery (committee member), The Independent Artists, The Irish Society for Design and Craftwork, and the Irish Section of the World Craft Council.As a Committee member of Project Arts Centre, she had a one-person exhibition in the Project in 1968 of ceramic sculptures and graphics and exhibited for the first time enamel paintings in the Project in 1971.

Her ceramic sculpture was chosen to represent Ireland in the International Ceramics Exhibition at the V&A in 1973. In the 1970s exhibited regularly with the Davies Art Gallery, David Hendricks Gallery, Barren Hill, Cellars and Garrets, the Emmet Gallery, The Kenny Gallery, the Project art Centre, Oireactas, RHA, the United Arts Club, the Robinson Gallery Dublin, and the Caldwell Gallery Belfast. Her work was also shown as part of the Swedish Design Exhibition in Kenny's Gallery, Galway in 1969.

Though a prolific artist who exhibited in Dublin throughout the 1960s and ’70s, Ågren-McElroy had faded into obscurity by the ’80s.
