= Nath Í of Cúl Fothirbe =

Irish saint

Saint Nath Í
- Irish saint, monastic founder
- Church: Cúl Fothirbe, Taney

Sainthood
- Feast day: 1 August
- Venerated in: Catholicism

Saint Nath Í or Nathí (fl. 6th century?), also anglicised to Nathy, was an early Irish saint of the Dál Messin Corb, who was credited with the foundation of Cúl Fothirbe in Dál nAraide territory and with becoming its first bishop. He is not to be confused with Nath Í, bishop and founder of Sruthair Guaire (Shrule, County Carlow) and brother to co-founder Domoingen.

No separate hagiographical Life survives for the saint, but he appears in a number of medieval Irish sources, including the Martyrology of Tallaght, medieval Irish genealogies, and a list of bishops in the Book of Leinster.

== Background ==
In the Irish genealogies, Nath Í is called a son of Senach son of Fergus Láebderc (in the Laud genealogies, a mac Fergusa) and made a member of the Dál Messin Corb of Leinster, the dynasty which also produced St Cóemgen of Glendalough. According to Ailbhe Mac Shamhráin, Nath Í may well have flourished in the first half of the 6th century, which would rule out the claim that he was a pupil of Máel Ruain at Tallaght.

== Bishop and founder ==
In medieval Irish sources, Nath Í is usually identified as the saint who founded Cúl Fothirbe (Cúil Foithirbe), a place whose exact location has not been identified but which seems to have been in Dál nAraide territory (County Down). His entry in the Martyrology of Tallaght associates him with Cúil Sachaille and the saint mentioned below him with Fothirb, but this may be an error. Several sources attribute to him the office of bishop (epscop), notably a list of bishops preserved in the Book of Leinster.

Nath Í also appears to be associated with Tech Nath Í (lit. "The House of Nath Í"), which belonged to Glendalough and gave its name to the parish of Taney in the Dundrum area of south County Dublin. It has been argued that this was the site of Cúl Fothirbe, while the term tech may also be taken to indicate that relics of the saint were kept there.

The Martyrology of Tallaght and its later counterparts give his feast day as 1 August, presumably the day that he died.

== See also ==
- St. Nahi's Church (Dundrum, Dublin)
