= Taney Parish =

Anglican community in Dublin, Ireland

Coordinates: 53°17′27″N 6°14′20″W

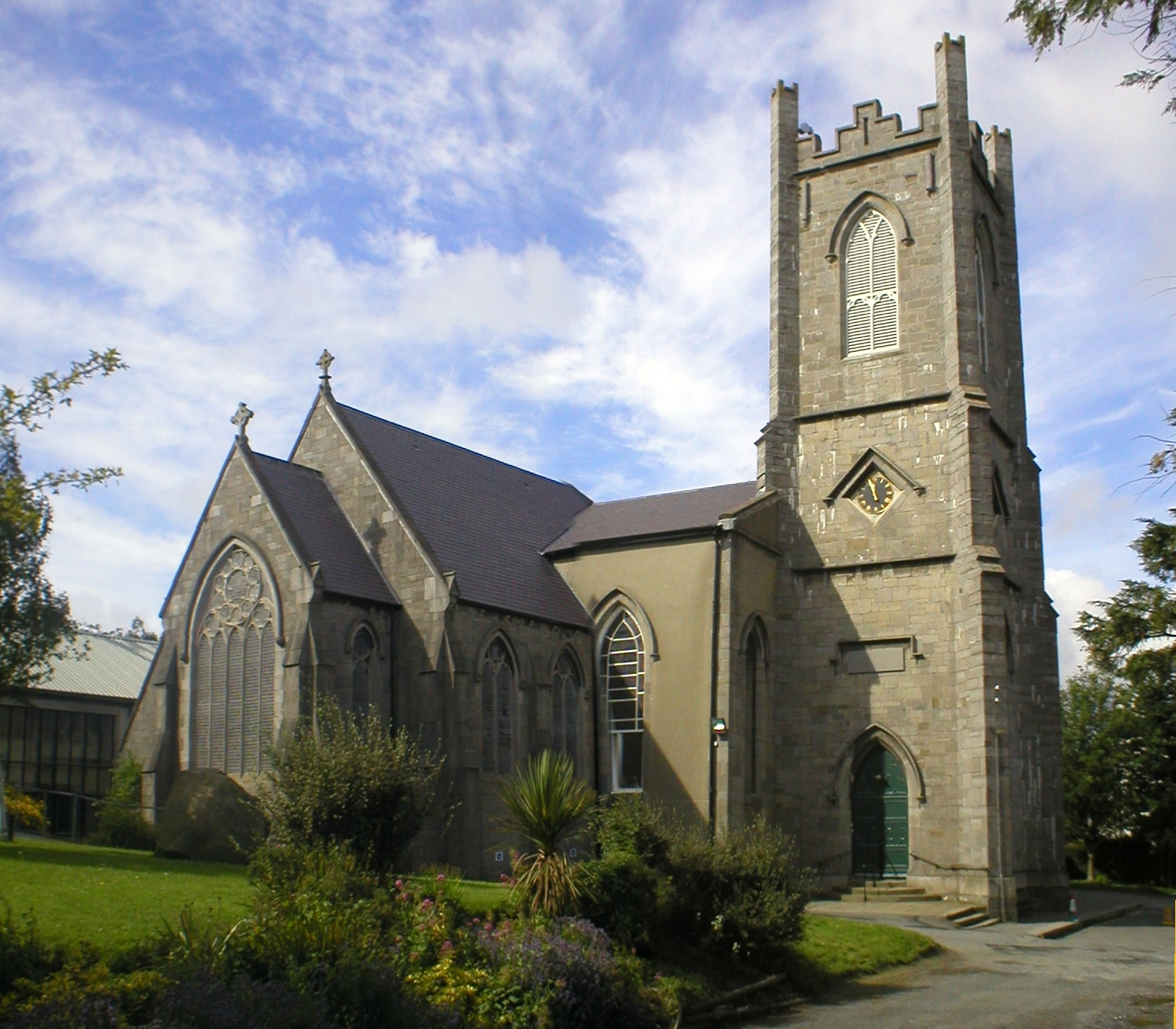
Christ Church, the main Parish Church

The Parish of Taney (Irish: Teach Naithí) is a populous parish in the Church of Ireland, located in the Dundrum area of Dublin. Taney is also a civil parish of the same name, in the barony of Dublin and the barony of Rathdown.

== History ==
=== Early history ===
Taney's origins go back to the early Irish saint Nathi, who in the 6th century established a centre for monastic life. This centre may have been on what is now the site of St. Nahi's Church in Dundrum. The derivation of the parish name, Taney, suggests that it derives from the Irish Teach Nahi or Nahi's house. Another possible source is Tamhnach, meaning a green field or arable spot. While there are no details available, there seems little doubt that religious worship was taking place here for some considerable time before the Anglo-Norman Invasion of 1169–1171, which made use of a papal bull asserting Rome's rights to all islands off the coast of Europe. The Rural See (seat of a Rural Bishop) of Taney is mentioned in a report of Cardinal Paparo in 1152. The next record is as "the Deanery of Tanhy" in a taxation list sent from Rome to the Diocese of Dublin.

When Henry II granted Leinster to Strongbow, Tacheny was one of two areas held back, being allocated to Hugh de Clahull, who later passed his Dublin lands to the Archbishop of Dublin. In a papal bull of 1179, there is a reference to "the middle place of Tighney" (annotated in the Liber Niger of a later Archbishop, Alen, as "alias Tawney"), with a church and three subsidiary chapels (at Donnybrook, Kilgobbin and Rathfarnham).

In 1235, the Rural Dean of Taney was J. Matthew. Archbishop Luke (1228–1255) established Taney as a prebend of St. Patrick's Cathedral and until 1851, the Archdeacons of Dublin held the Prebendary and the post of Rector of Taney, and the parish was chiefly overseen by curates-in-charge.

=== Taney in the Church of Ireland ===
At some point between the separation between Henry VIII and Rome and the reign of Elizabeth I, the parish became part of the State Church. The Roman Catholic heritage of the district eventually became part of a Union Parish, overseen from Booterstown (the Church of Ireland parish also spent much of the ensuing centuries as part of a Union, that of St. Peter's in the south inner city). In a reference of 1546, there is mention of Taney Rectory, and annual rentals totalling 19 pounds, which formed the salary of the resident curate. By 1615, Archbishop Thomas Jones reported in a royal visitation record that there was a resident curate, Robert Pont (also taking services in Donnybrook and Rathfarnham), that the "Church and Chancel" (of St. Nahi) were in good repair, and that prayer books were available.

By 1630, when Richard Prescott became curate, the rentals had risen in value to 100 pounds a year but Archbishop Bulkeley reported in that year that the church was in poor condition and that there were only two attending householders (most of the local population still adhered to the Roman Catholic Church). The next curate was John Sankey, also responsible for Donnybrook, Rathfarnham, Kilgobbin, Cruagh and Whitechurch.

In 1753, one A. Archball became curate, moving from service in Howth and Kilbarrack, and Jeremy Walsh took office in 1758, supervising the rebuilding of Taney Church in 1760, as attested to by a chalice still held there, presented by Archdeacon Isaac Mann. The new building was consecrated on 8 June of that year.

Walsh was succeeded by William Dwyer (1787) and Matthew Campbell (1787–1814). The parish school appears to have been started during Reverend Campbell's time, with references found to "the Charity School of Tanee" back to 1890. There is also reference to a George Horan as curate in 1792, possibly the first of a number of Curates Assistant. The earliest original parish records, deposited in the Library of the Representative Church Body, and dating back to 1791, are useful for determining the population and activities of the parish over time.

=== Early 19th century ===
In 1802, Taney still held the status of a Rural Deanery, including the churches of Taney itself (St. Nahi's), Kilgobbin, Rathfarnham, Stillorgan, Crumlin and Tallaght. As the local population (notably of Dundrum and Churchtown) and the parish membership grew, the old church became too small, and by 1809, discussions were well underway on replacing the parish church with a new and more spacious structure. The first formal proposal, for the site now occupied by Christ Church, was considered by the Select Vestry on 22 October 1809, but failed. However, after discussion with the leaseholder and the landowner, and other representations, moneys were sought from the Board of First Fruits, and £4,300 were lent. The decision to build was finally made in 1814, after a visit to the new church at Monkstown, which design was used as a model. Richard Ryan became curate in that year and oversaw construction, which commenced in mid-1815, with additional funds being raised by the sale of pews in 1816, as the budget was exceeded.

Christ Church, ca. 1895

Christ Church was completed and opened for worship in 1818, with a licence issued, unusually, by the Archbishop of Cashel, and an initial consecration took place on 21 June 1818. This original Christ Church was rather smaller than the current building. Henry Hunt was curate from 1820 to 1821, followed by W. Vance (1821) and James Bulwar (1821–1824). Easter Vestry accounts of 1824 show costs for a vestry room, a 5-hundredweight bell and a sexton's house. Henry Hamilton became non-resident curate in 1824, and in 1825, A. Campbell replaced him, as resident curate, followed in 1830 by Dr. Thomas Prior. In 1829, an Infant School was launched, and at some point in that period, part of the old church was converted into a Boys School (another part was used for funeral services), and a Girls Charity School established in a cottage at one end of the burial ground. In the later 1820s, and again in 1832, work was done to improve the roof of Christ Church, the South Gallery was added in 1833 and in 1835 the Ecclesiastical Commissioners gave 256 pounds towards interior decoration. In 1836, when C.A. Schoales became curate, a Sunday School was opened (later this held the Infant School and teacher's residence, and then a sexton's residence). William Stanford was curate from 1837 to 1851.

=== Mid- to late 19th century ===
In 1850, the Central Criminal Lunatic Asylum was opened (now the Central Mental Hospital) and when, in July 1851, Taney was established as an independent parish, the chaplaincy of this facility was attached to the post of rector. Taney's independence marked the beginning of the end of arrangements which had seen the Archdeacons of Dublin holding office additionally as vicars of the large St. Peter's Parish in the south city, and Rectors of Taney, Rathfarnham (also independent in July 1851) and Donnybrook (made independent in 1864).

The first rector was Andrew Bredin and he was succeeded in 1857 by Busteed Moeran. On the first Sunday of May, 1859, following a petition to the rector and the issue of a licence by the Archbishop of Dublin, services for the coastwards part of the parish were begun in a cottage in the grounds of a house called Seafield in Stillorgan, local families contributing 30 pounds for fitting of a room, and 30 towards an attending curate's salary. William Hamilton became rector in 1867. Hamilton, who was also a Rural Dean, Prebendary of Harristown, and then of St. Michan's and Chaplain to the Lord Lieutenant, led the parish until 1895.

At Christ Church, the stained glass east window, paid for by the Roe family, was dedicated in March 1871, and a new organ bought by Henry Roe, who also famously paid for the restoration of Christ Church Cathedral. After Mr. Roe paid off all remaining building finance, it was possible to fully consecrate Christ Church, which the Archbishop of Dublin did on 10 June 1872. By 1873, the cottage at Seafield was too small for the eastern congregation, and the landlord, the Earl of Pembroke, offered a site at the corner of Fosters Avenue and Stillorgan Road, in Mount Merrion. After much fund-raising, the modern parish's third church, St Thomas', was built there in 1874, operating initially as a chapel-of-ease. In 1867, a licence was granted for the performance of Divine Service at what was then still known as the 'Dundrum Lunatic Asylum' and Church of Ireland services are held regularly at the Central Mental Hospital to this day, though the original Church of Ireland chapel was donated to the local Catholic parish in the later 19th century.

In 1895, Messrs. Hamilton and Ball published a work on the Parish of Taney – at this time, the old Church of St. Nahi was in disuse but services did resume there by the early 20th century. Also in 1895, John J. Robinson became rector, overseeing the building of the parochial hall from 1897 to June 1898.

In 1897, a new Church of Ireland School was established at Eglinton Terrace, paid for by Lord Pembroke, with all parochial school activities moving there. This became a National School in 1898. In addition, in 1898, a parish magazine was launched, lasting until 1913. By the turn of the 20th century Taney Parish comprised the following townlands: Balally, Ballinteer, Churchtown, Drummartin, Dundrum, Farranboley, Friarsland, Kingstown (Dún Laoghaire), Mount Anville, Mount Merrion or Callary, Rathmines, Roebuck, Ticknock and Trimlestown or Owenstown.

=== Taney Parish from 1900 to 1956 ===
In 1901, W. Monk Gibbon, founder of the first Boys’ Brigade Company in Dublin while a curate at St. Mattias in 1890, was appointed as rector. Gibbon would serve for over 34 years, becoming a canon of Christ Church Cathedral in 1923. He founded a Dundrum Company of the Boys’ Brigade also, which was replaced in 1922 by troops of Boy Scouts (SAI, now Scouting Ireland) and Girl Guides. 1901 also saw the establishment of the local branch of the Mothers' Union. The school was extended in 1905. In 1909, services in St. Nahi's Church were suspended due to the dangerous condition of the roof, which had to be replaced. The rector led much other restoration work on the old church also, including making of new flooring and seats, with main rebuilding completed in 1910.

A. W. F. Orr became was rector from 1935 to his retirement in 1958; he was made a canon of Christ Church Cathedral in 1946. Canon Orr died in 1964 and the oak stair at Christ Church was erected in his memory. In 1945, a special meeting was held to address the decline of parish organisations and parochial hall use, and sixteen groups were started or restored.

=== The separation of the Parish of Mount Merrion ===
St. Thomas's became the parish church for a new Parish of Mount Merrion in 1956, after conclusion of discussions that had begun in 1948. Trevor Hipwell, senior curate of Taney, was appointed as its first Rector, occupying a newly built rectory by the church. A few years later, in 1965, the church was extended. In 1994, Mount Merrion Parish was placed in a Group with the Parish of Booterstown (which had previously absorbed Carysfort Parish), and the two parishes, still with separate Select Vestries, share a rector, at the St. Thomas Rectory. The Joint Parish Office is also at the Mount Merrion site, and services are celebrated at both sites.

=== Taney Parish from 1956 ===
Walter Burrows became rector in 1959, having established a new church at Crumlin, and in 1968, the 1897 school was superseded by one at Sydenham Villas. Desmond Harman served as curate assistant from 1967 to 1973; he later became Dean of Christ Church Cathedral (an office he held until December 2007). Desmond Sinnamon succeeded Rev. Burrows as rector in 1983. After some debate, it was decided in 1989 to sell the old Parochial Hall (which raised 433000 pounds) and to build a new Parish Centre in the church grounds (whose freehold was bought out). The foundation stone of the new centre (beside Christ Church) was blessed on 11 November 1990, with the centre, with classrooms, meeting spaces and offices, was completed in September 1991 and opened by the President of Ireland on Thursday 21 November 1991.

Significant work was also done on the Parish National School in the closing years of the 20th century. At the beginning of the new millennium, the present parish is bounded by those of Milltown to the north, Ticknock to the south, Churchtown to the west and Goatstown to the east. With over 800 families and more than 2000 parishioners, Taney is now the largest Church of Ireland parish in Ireland in numerical terms.

Also in 2000, the church was selected as the location for the old peal of change-ringing bells from St George's Church in Dublin City.

Desmond Sinnamon ended his 29 year term as rector in 2012. He had a hall within the church named after him. Reverend Sinnamon was succeeded by Canon Robert Warren. Canon Warren served as rector from 2012 until his retirement in 2021. He was succeeded in 2021 by Rev. Nigel Pierpoint M.Th. Rev Pierpoint previously served as deacon in Christ Church, Taney in 2015 and in 2016 was appointed as curate.

== Christ Church organ ==
The organ of Christ Church Taney was originally built by Forster and Andrews. However, the majority of its current pipework comes from a Telford organ. This instrument was installed in Christ Church, Bray some time in the 19th century and then moved to St. Paul's, Bray. St. Paul's eventually became redundant and in 1989, the organ was brought to Taney and installed by Kenneth Jones and Associates. Most of the original Forster and Andrews pipes were discarded or used by Jones in other projects.

=== Specification ===
- Great: Open Diapason 8, Stopped Diapason 8, Principal 4, Harmonic Flute 4, Fifteenth 2, Mixture II-III, Tremulant.
- Swell: Stopped Diapason 8, Salicional 8, Voix Celeste 8, Principal 4, Stopped Flute 4, Fifteenth 2, Mixture II, Trumpet 8, Oboe 8.
- Pedal: Open Diapason 16, Subbass 16, Trombone 16.
- Couplers: Swell to Great, Swell to Pedal, Great to Pedal

== Sources ==
- Dundrum, Dublin, 1968: Select Vestry of Taney Parish: A Short History of Taney Parish (M.H. Coote, editor; R.C.H. Townshend, researcher)
- Taney: portrait of a parish : a social and historical profile of the Parish of Taney in Dublin Carol Robinson Tweed, 1994, ISBN 978-0-9524532-0-8
