= Violet Spiller Hay =

Irish Christian Science teacher and hymnist

- Born: Caroline Violet Spiller; 17 July 1873; Dundrum, Ireland
- Died: 28 June 1969 (aged 95)
- Occupations: Christian Science practitioner and teacher
- Years active: 1902-1969
- Known for: Writing hymns

Violet Spiller Hay (17 July 1873 – 28 June 1969) was a Christian Science teacher and hymnist. She was one of the first teachers of Christian Science in the United Kingdom and the religion's first teacher in South Africa.

== Biography ==
Violet Hay was born Caroline Violet Spiller in 1873 in Dundrum, near Dublin in Ireland, the daughter of Matilda Lucy née Stirling (1851-1931) and Lt. Col. Duncan Chisholm Oliver Spiller (1843-1923), an officer in the British Army. She developed an interest in Christian Science in 1896 and was among those who were present for the first public meetings of the First Church of Christ, Scientist held in the Portman Rooms on Baker Street. After a short period at The First Church of Christ, Scientist in Boston in the United States, she caught a glimpse of Mary Baker Eddy in Concord, New Hampshire, where Eddy was living at the time. Hay wrote of this brief encounter in her reminiscence 'My brief glimpses of Mrs. Eddy' (1946). She returned to the United Kingdom and began her work on behalf of Christian Science in 1901 when she was involved in setting up the first Church of Christ, Scientist in London. By 1903 she held a 'Primary' class certificate and in 1907 a 'Normal' class certificate from the Christian Science Board of Education which allowed her to become a registered teacher.

The 1915 edition of The Christian Science Journal lists her as a Christian Science teacher and practitioner in Cape Town in South Africa, where she taught a number of classes. In South Africa on 26 April 1915 she married Commander the Hon. Sereld Mordaunt Alan Josslyn Hay R.N. (1878-1939), son of Charles Hay, 20th Earl of Erroll. During her time on the Committee on Publication for Cape Province, Hay was successful in having a clause included in proposed legislation that protected the work of Christian Science in South Africa. In 1917 she wrote a letter to a Cape Town newspaper in which she put forward an energetic defence of her faith. On her and her husband's subsequent return to London in about 1921 Hay was on the London committee and after on the Boston committee formed by the Christian Science Board of Directors to revise the Christian Science Hymnal. Seven of her hymns including 'The Airman's Song of Praise' (No. 136) can be found in the 1932 edition. Hay chaired the Christian Science Hymnal Revision Committee in London (1928-1932), following which she became a member of the Final Hymnal Revision Committee until 1955.

Violet Spiller Hay died in Whitehaven in Bathford near Bath in 1969.
