= St. Nahi's Church, Dundrum =

Coordinates: 53°17′35.25″N 6°14′52″W

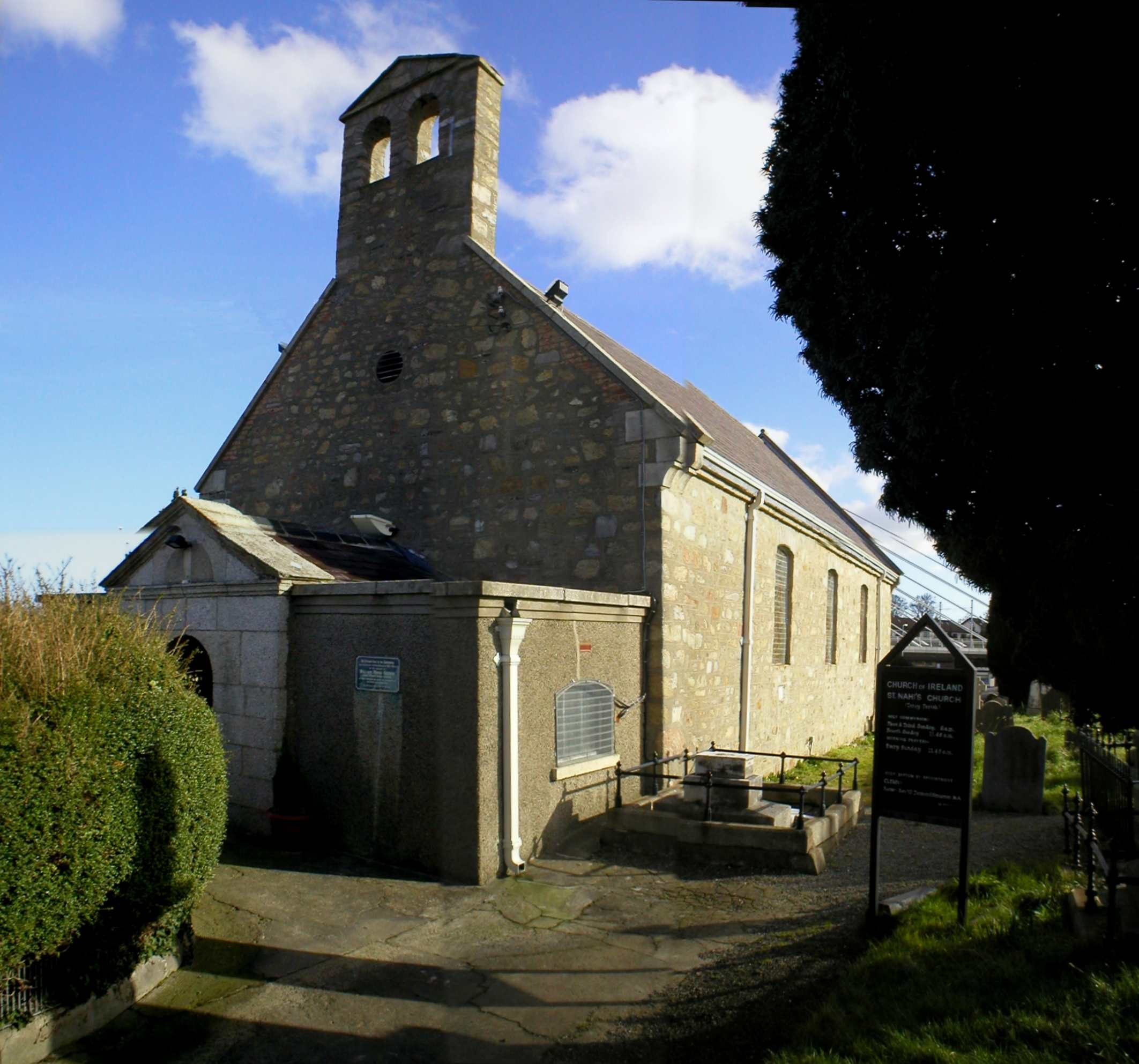
St. Nahi's Church

St. Nahi is an 18th-century church in Dundrum, Dublin, Ireland.

== History ==
The name Taney derives from Tigh Naithi meaning the house or place of Nahi, and who may also be associated with Tobarnea, a seashore well near Blackrock. The current church is still in use by the local Church of Ireland community and is one of two churches in the Parish of Taney (historically encompassing the whole area around Dundrum). It is built on the site of an early Irish monastery founded by Saint NahÍ.

St. Nahi's stands on the grounds of the original monastery, having been refurbished several times, most recently in 1910, after a period when it was in use as the parish boys' school. Following storm damage to the roof, a major refurbishment was carried out by the then Rector of the Parish, Canon William Monk Gibbon (father of the poet of the same name), who is buried in the grounds of the church. A plaque erected after the refurbishment reads:

The entrance gate to this Churchyard was erected by the parishioners of Taney Parish to the memory of William Monk Gibbons, Canon of Christ Church Cathedral by whose impression and effort the restoration of this church was accomplished. He repaired the altar of the Lord.

== Items of interest ==
The church contains some interesting artefacts including the baptismal font of the Duke of Wellington who was baptised in 1769, donated to Taney Parish in 1914 by the closing of St. Kevin’s Church in Camden Row, and altar tapestries depicting scenes from the Bible. The tapestries illustrating the Last Supper were made by the two Yeats sisters Lily and Lolly Yeats, both of whom are interred in the graveyard.

Two Rathdown Slabs are displayed inside the church. These ornate burial slabs date back 1,000 years to the Viking-Christian era. Such slabs have only been found in the barony of Rathdown (the area roughly covering Churchtown to Bray). Only about 30 of these slabs have been discovered to date, these two were discovered in 2002 in the graveyard by archaeologist Chris Corlett, who had missed his bus from Dundrum and decided to explore the cemetery. Local historian John Lennon, as well as Harry Griffith, aided by Dúchas, relocated the slabs inside the church. Harry Griffith has been researching and listing the graves in St. Nahi's graveyard since 2001, compiling a comprehensive history and listing of the graveyard. Harry Griffith was interred in the graveyard after an illness on 18 April 2012.

An insight into life expectancy for the area can be gleaned from the "Index to the Register of Burials" for the parish between January 1897 and April 1917 show 1,836 people buried during this period, of which 551 were children under 6 years of age.

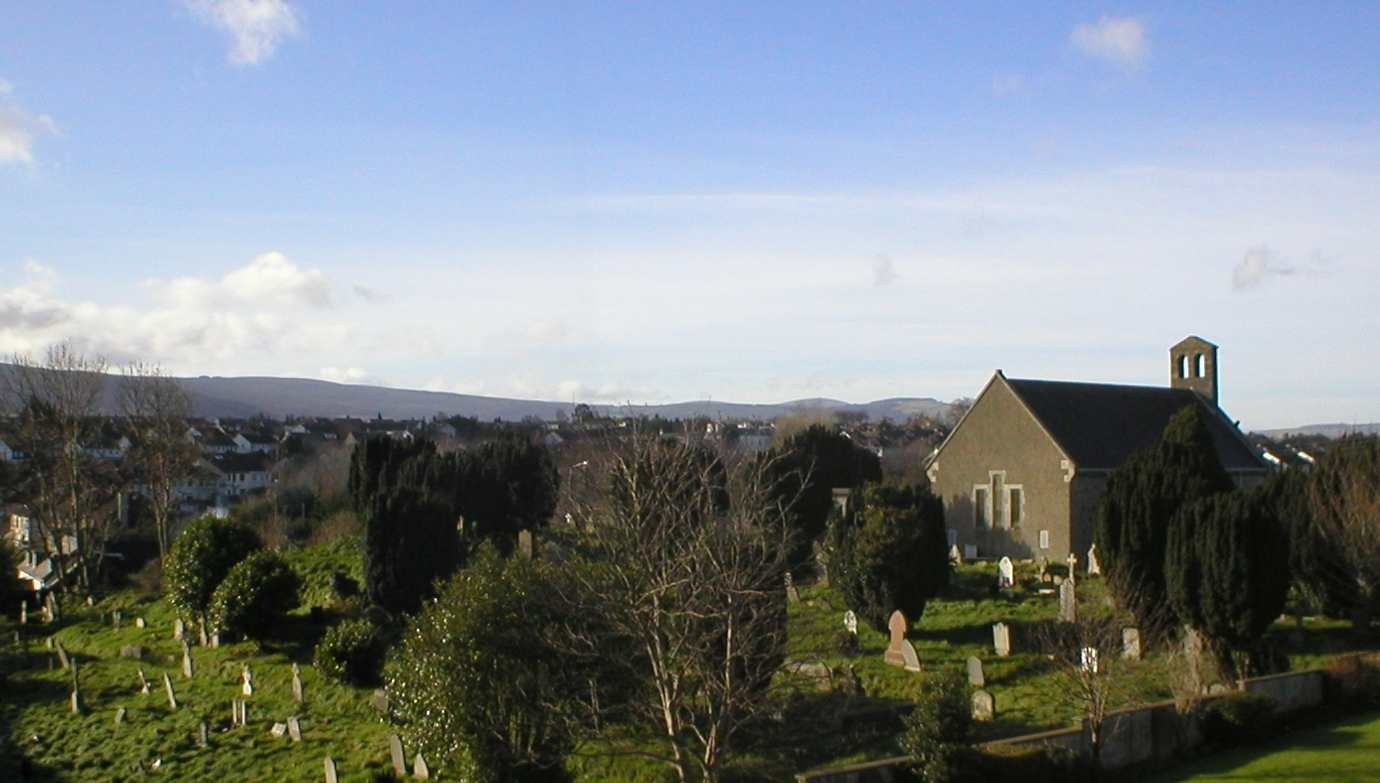
View from the LUAS bridge

== Graveyard ==
Cremated remains are interred to the left of the entrance gates. This area was originally used for patients of the Dundrum Central Mental Hospital. Old records refer to this area as the Asylum Plot.

A back gate to the church was only recently uncovered under much overgrowth. Although it had been used by teachers as a shortcut between the Church (when it was being used as a boys' school) and the nearby girls' school, its original function is said to have been as an entrance for Roman Catholics when attending funerals at a time when they were barred from entering the main gates of a Protestant church.

Many Irish Republican graves lie within the graveyard, including the gravestones of Lorcain McSuibhne, a member of the Irish Republican Army killed in 1922 in Kildare (his funeral occurred at St. Nahi's and there exists photographic evidence of Éamon de Valera in attendance) and of James Burke, who was killed in Croke Park on Bloody Sunday.

The graveyard also contains many Royal Irish Constabulary Officers and Freemasons. There is one War grave. Sgt. William Anthony Kavanagh, RAF Volunteer Reserve, age 24, died 23 Sep 1944 as a result of a cycling accident while home on holiday, son of William and Mary Kavanagh of Balally. The site also contains the grave of the Irish physicist George Johnstone Stoney, who died in London in 1911. His ashes were brought back to be with his wife, mother and sister. His cousin Robert Stoney was a local curate when his wife died.

Currently, over 10,000 burials have been recorded, with the earliest visible gravestone dating back to 1734. The Parish of Taney: a History of Dundrum, Near Dublin, and its Neighbourhood published in 1895, claims that there are "tens of thousands" of burials within the graveyard, a credible figure considering its age.

As the churchyard predates the disestablishment of the Church of Ireland in 1869, it is open for burial to all those who live within the boundaries of the Parish of Taney, whatever their denomination.

== Organ ==
The organ of St. Nahi's was built by the renowned Irish organ-builder William Telford. However, St. Nahi's was not its original home. The organ was only installed there in the 1990s. The church used a harmonium (which is still there) to lead congregational singing. The organ has one manual, a pedal of limited compass and seven stops.
