= Monk Gibbon =

Irish poet and prolific writer

William Monk Gibbon (1896 – 29 November 1987) was an Irish poet and prolific writer, known as "The Grand Old Man of Irish Letters". His collection of over twenty volumes of poetry, autobiography, travel and criticism are kept at Queen's University Belfast. The Monk Gibbon fonds are kept at the University Archives, Queen's University at Kingston. The material consists of correspondence, drafts of his books, poems, photographs and news clippings. Correspondents include W. B. Yeats, other members of the Yeats family, George William Russell (A.E.), George Moore, John Eglinton and Padraic Colum. He also wrote many published novels, and has been characterised as "self-regarding and prickly".

== Family ==
Monk Gibbon was the son of the Rev. Canon William Monk Gibbon (1864–1935), a Church of Ireland clergyman, and from 1900 vicar of St. Nahi's Church, Dundrum. His mother, Isabella Agnes Meredith, was a daughter of William Rice Meredith of Dublin, the brother of John Walsingham Cooke Meredith. Monk was a nephew of The Rt. Hon. Richard Edmund Meredith and a first cousin of Carew Arthur Meredith. Monk's uncle, John, inherited the Gibbon estates of Sleedagh House, County Wexford, and The Parks in Neston, Cheshire, which came to them via the Monk family for whom he was named.

== Career ==
He was educated at St. Columba's College, Dublin and Keble College, Oxford, but after only one term he volunteered for the army, serving as an officer in France during the First World War until invalided out in 1915. He became an avid pacifist after his experiences of war, and left Ireland to teach English in Switzerland. He also taught in England before returning to Ireland, not retiring until he was in his 80s.

As a British officer on leave in Ireland, he was involved in the Easter Rising of 1916. His book Inglorious Soldier gives a first-hand, and one of the most detailed, accounts of the shooting of the pacifist Francis Sheehy-Skeffington. His papers present lively and intimate accounts of the famous Irish writers whom he knew personally, such as William Butler Yeats, George Moore (novelist), Edith Anna Somerville and Katharine Tynan.

At his father's church, Lily Yeats, sister of W. B. Yeats, was a parishioner.. There was also a family relationship: Gibbon and the Yeats family were cousins. There was no love lost between the poets Gibbon and Yeats, however; and the biography Gibbon wrote was rather hostile. Yeats in return said of Gibbon: "Monk Gibbon is one of the three people in Dublin whom I dislike... Because he is argumentative!"

In 1963, Gibbon collaborated in the editing and publication of Michael Farrell's posthumous novel Thy Tears Might Cease.

== Private life ==
In 1928, he married Mabel Dingwall, daughter of Walter Molyneux Dingwall of Bonchurch and Mabel Sophia Spender, a daughter of Edward Spender of Bath, Somerset. They were the parents of six children. Mrs Gibbon's father, Edward Spender, was a strong supporter of the Women's Suffrage movement in which his sister, the novelist Emily Spender played a leading role as a member of the executive committee of the Central Committee of the National Society for Women's Suffrage. Edward Spender was a cousin of the diarist Henry Crabb Robinson, and a brother-in-law of the novelist Lillian Spender and the liberal politician William Saunders, with whom he founded the Central News Agency (London). Mrs Gibbon's mother was a first cousin of John Alfred Spender, uncle of the poet Sir Stephen Spender.

The Gibbons' home, Tara Hall, at Sandycove, County Dublin, was a literary centre and afternoon tea parties there often ran into the night. Frequent visitors there included Irish writers such as Padraic Colum, Ulick O'Connor and Austin Clarke. Gibbon always wrote in bed and often wandered down to the sea front in his pyjamas to collect driftwood. He was a keen cyclist all his life and could still be found riding his bicycle around Sandycove in his late 80s.

== Works ==
- The Tremulous String (1926) limited edition 250 hand printed copies
- The Branch of Hawthorn Tree (1927) limited edition 460 copies, with color illustrations by Charles Picart Le Doux
- The Seals (1935) autobiography
- The Living Torch (1937) poems by AE, editor
- Mount Ida (1948)
- This Insubstantial Pageant (1951)
- "Austria" (1953)
- The Masterpiece and the Man: Yeats as I Knew Him (1959) biography
- The Climate of Love (1961)
- Inglorious Soldier (1968) (Autobiographic)
- The Brahms Waltz (1970)
- The Velvet Bow (1972)
- The Pupil (1981)
