= Balally Luas stop =

Tram stop in Dublin, Ireland

Balally Baile Amhlaoibh
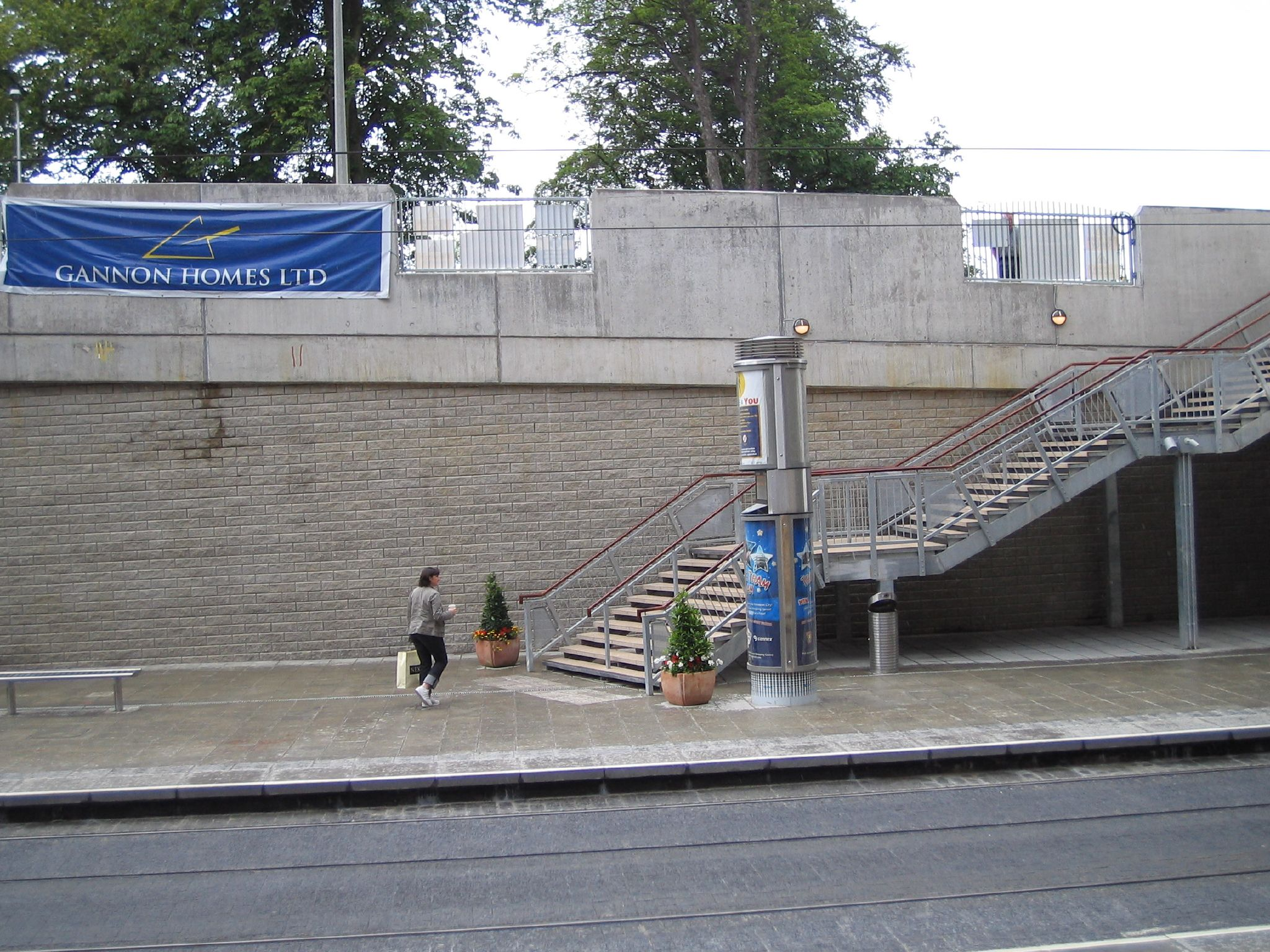
- The northbound platform at Balally

General information
- Location: Overend Avenue; Balally/Dundrum, County Dublin; Ireland
- Coordinates: 53°17′10″N 6°14′12″W
- Owner: Transport Infrastructure Ireland
- Operator: Transdev (as Luas)
- Line: Green
- Platforms: 2
- Bus routes: 3
- Bus operators: Dublin Bus; Go-Ahead Ireland
- Connections: 44; 161; L25

Construction
- Structure type: In cutting
- Accessible: Yes

Other information
- Fare zone: Green 3

Key dates
- 30 June 2004: Stop opened
- 2018: Platforms extended
Location
- Location within Dublin

Balally (Irish: Baile Amhlaoibh) is a stop on the Luas light-rail tram system in Dún Laoghaire–Rathdown, County Dublin, Ireland. It opened in 2004 as a stop on the Green Line and serves Dundrum Town Centre, the southern area of Dundrum and the nearby suburbs of Balally and Goatstown. The stop is located at the junction at the side of Overend Avenue.

== Location and access ==
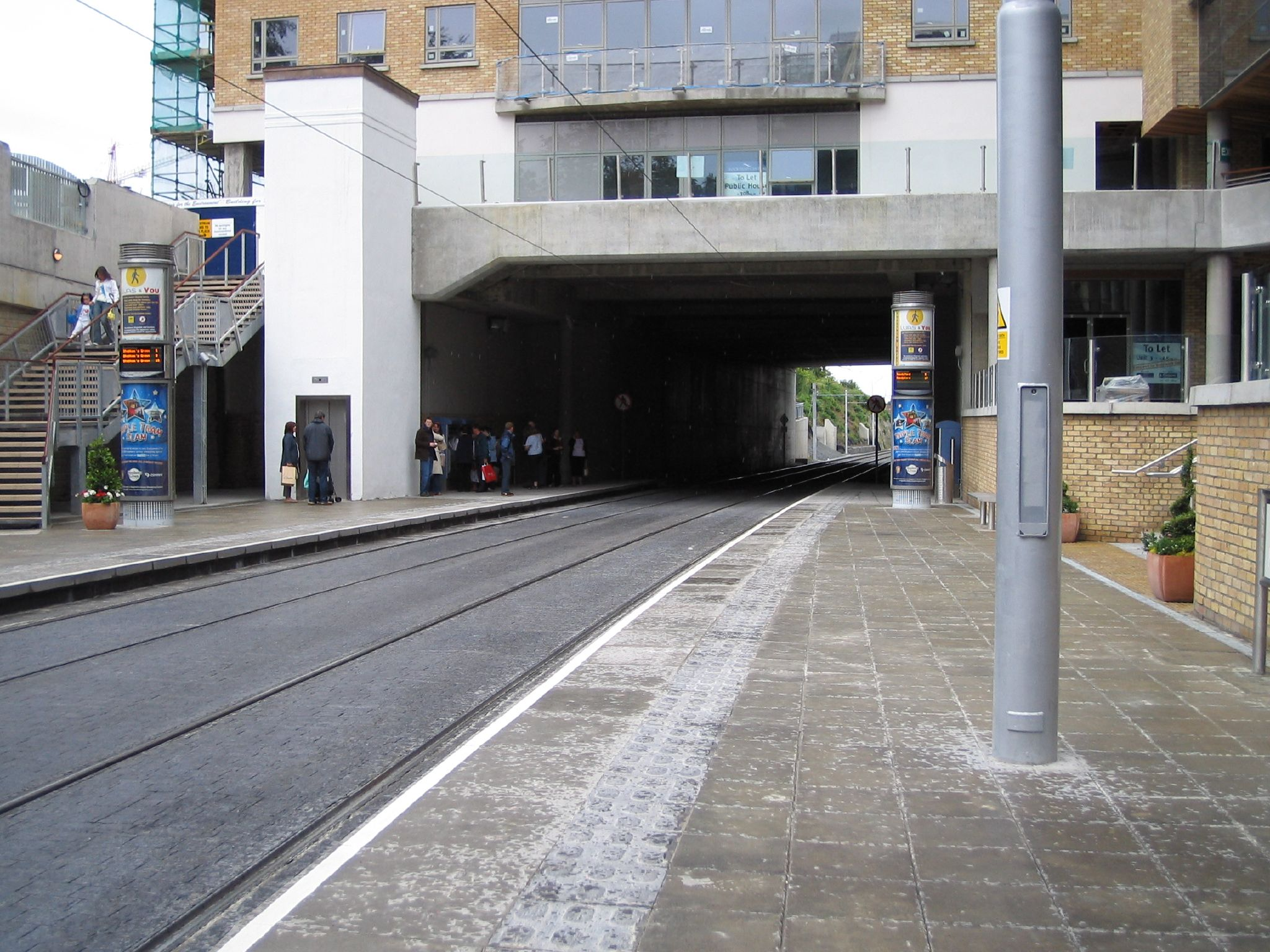
Looking north from the platform at Balally

Balally is located in an open-air station box. On either side, the tracks run in cut and cover tunnels. To the northwest, they run under the Rockfield Central apartment block and Overend Avenue. To the southeast, the tracks run under an internal street and an office block. The northbound platform has a staircase and a lift which lead directly to the street. The southbound platform has a flight of steps and a ramp which lead to a mall with shops under the Rockfield development. At street level, the stop is signposted with a solar-powered totem. Similar totems are seen at some other stops on the Green Line.

Balally has a Park and Ride facility with 421 spaces, of which 9 are reserved for those with disabled badges. The car park is underground, lying beneath another car park used by a housing development.

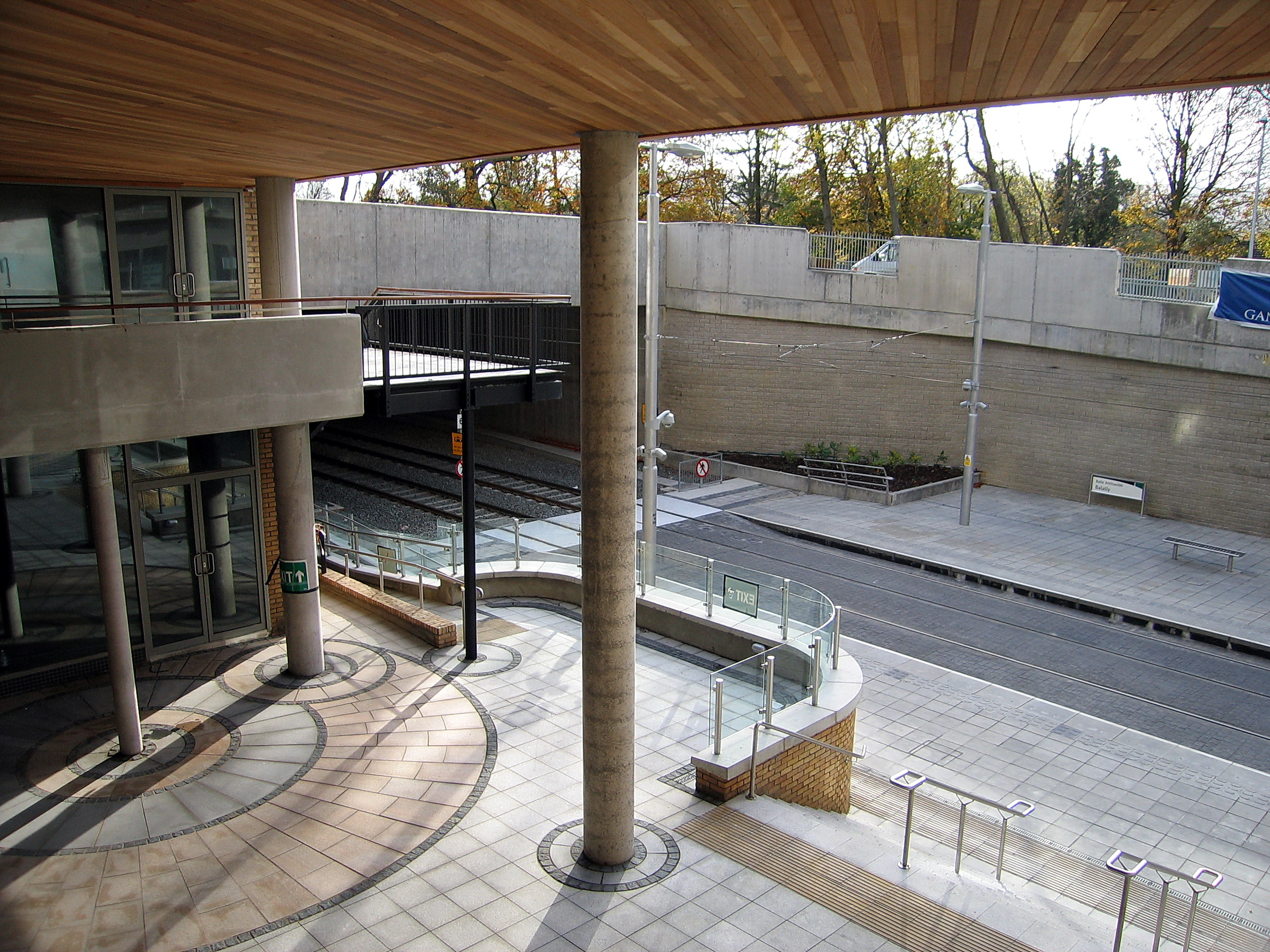
The stop as seen from within the neighbouring complex

== Onward transport ==
The stop is served by Dublin Bus route L25, connecting the stop with Stillorgan, Monkstown and Dún Laoghaire.
