= Notre Dame School, Dublin =

Former private school in Churchtown, Dublin, Ireland

Notre Dame School

Location
- Upper Churchtown Road, Churchtown; Dublin, D14; Ireland; 53.2939°N 6.2511°W

Information
- Type: Private school
- Motto: Virtus Scientiae Decus (Virtue is the sign of wisdom)
- Religious affiliation: Roman Catholic
- Established: 1953
- Founders: Notre Dame des Missions Sisters
- Closed: June 2019
- Local authority: Dublin City Council
- Oversight: Notre Dame Schools Trust Ltd
- Principal: Mildred Brannigan
- Gender: Girls
- Website: www.notredame.ie

Notre Dame School or Notre Dame des Missions School was a private, Roman Catholic school for girls in Churchtown, Dublin, Ireland, opened in 1953 and closed in 2019.

== History ==
Notre Dame was established in 1953 by the Notre Dame des Missions Sisters. The Notre Dame des Missions Sisters decided to exit the education sector in Ireland in the early 2000s, and they passed the operation of the school to the Notre Dame Schools Trust Ltd. The school was closed in June 2019 due to financial difficulties.

== Operations ==
Annual school fees in 2015 were around €4,300 per annum.

== Notable alumni ==
- Mary Lou McDonald, politician
