= Churchtown, Dublin =

Suburb of Dublin, Ireland

Churchtown Baile an Teampaill
- Suburb
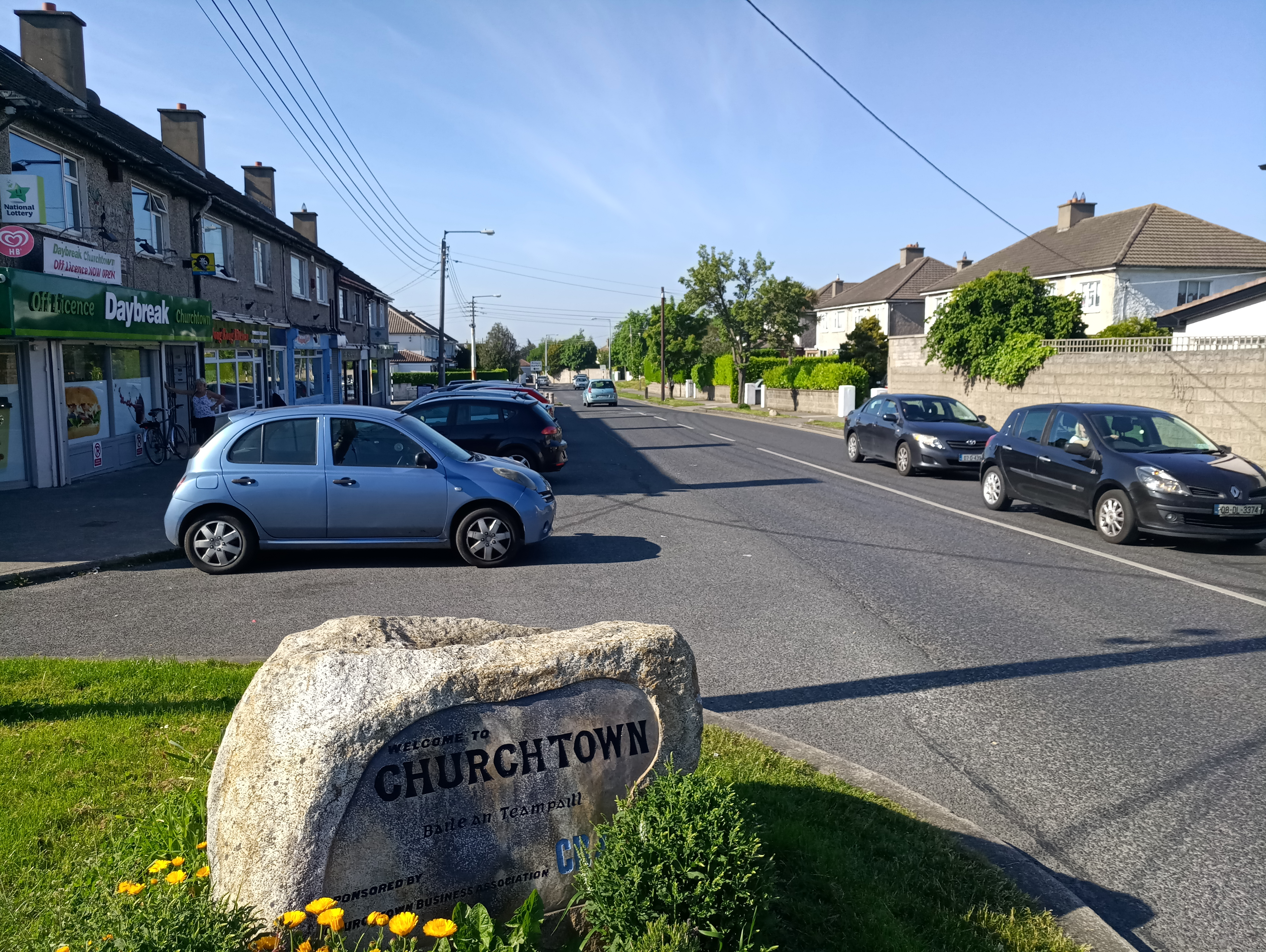
- Shops in Churchtown

- Location in Dublin Churchtown (Ireland)
- Coordinates: 53°17′44″N 6°15′30″W
- Country: Ireland
- Province: Leinster
- County: County Dublin
- Local authority: Dún Laoghaire–Rathdown County Council
- Time zone: UTC±0 (WET)
  - Summer (DST): UTC+1 (IST)
- Eircode routing key: D14
- Telephone area code: +353(0)1

Churchtown (Irish: Baile an Teampaill) is a largely residential suburb on the southside of Dublin, between Rathfarnham and Dundrum. It is within the administrative area of Dún Laoghaire—Rathdown County Council, in the traditional County Dublin.

== Demographics ==
Based on the 2006 Census, the population of Churchtown was 8,736, a small decrease from the 2002 census. The break-out by electoral area was as follows: Churchtown-Castle 1,244 Churchtown-Landscape 1,198 Churchtown-Nutgrove 3,100 Churchtown-Orwell 1,871 Churchtown-Woodlawn 1,323

== Amenities ==
Churchtown has a number of shops and pubs, including a mid-size supermarket, which has one of Dublin's few kosher sales facilities. It was also one of Dublin's centres for the driving test with the highest pass rate in the county, the ninth highest in Ireland, at 48.31%.

=== Nutgrove Shopping Centre ===
Nutgrove Shopping Centre was opened in October 1984 in what was then still a rural part of Dublin. The site for the shopping centre was located on part of the old Lamb's Jam orchards.

The centre included Ireland and Europe's first drive through restaurant when McDonald's opened a branch there. The practice of driving up to the window, ordering your food and driving away was relatively new at the time.

There were other firsts when Nutgrove opened, including the country's first social welfare services office was located in a shopping mall.

== Landmarks ==
=== Ely's Arch ===
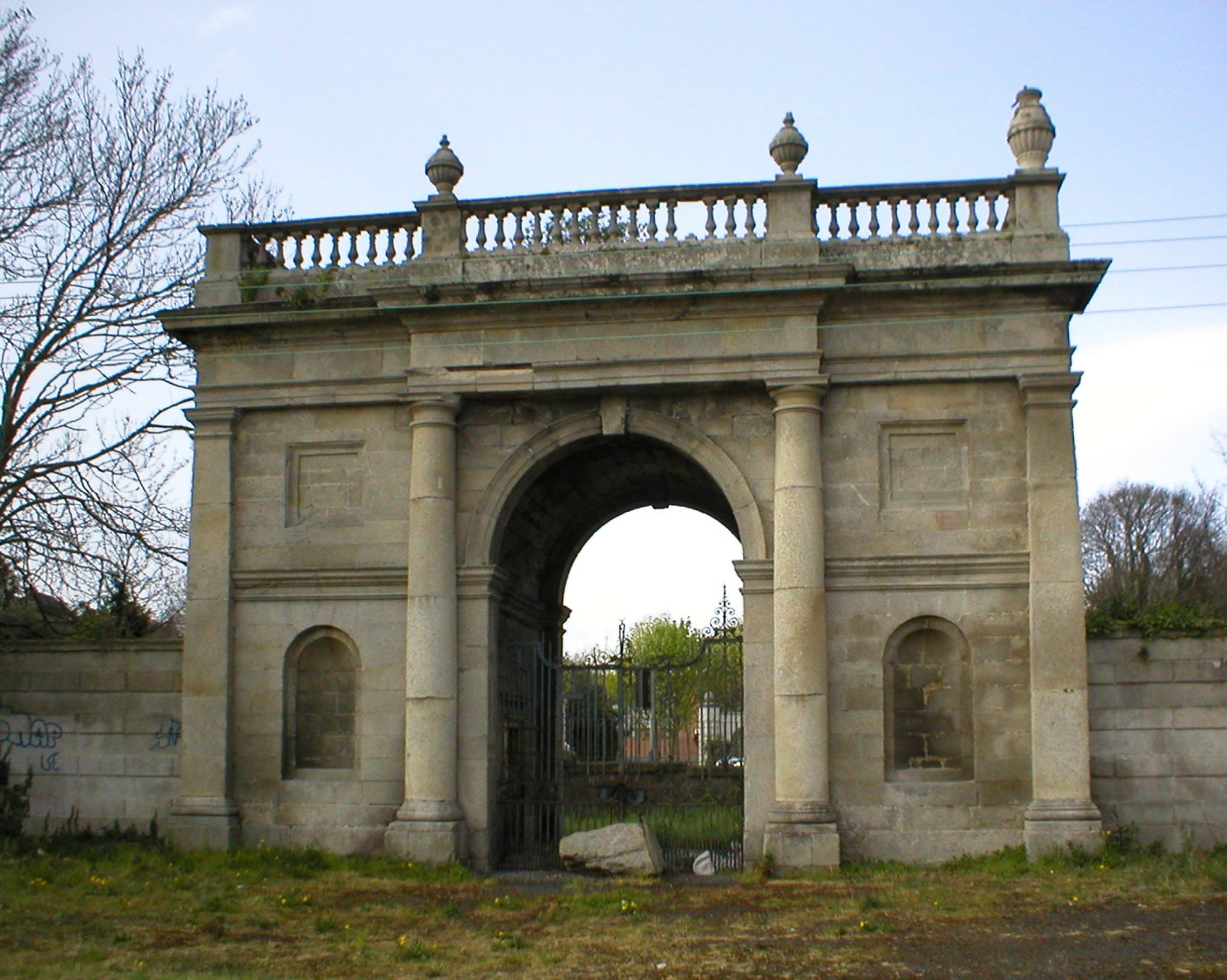
Ely's Arch

Braemor Road is marked by a gate lodge in the style of a triumphal arch from the 18th century, which originally led to Rathfarnham Castle. The erection of this gateway is attributed to Henry Loftus, Earl of Ely from 1769 to 1783 who was also responsible for the classical work on the castle itself. The arch is named the new gate on Frizell's map of 1779. After the division of the estate in 1913, the arch became the entrance to the Castle Golf Club but was later abandoned in favour of the more direct Woodside Drive entrance. Braemor Road (and Braemor Drive, Braemor Avenue, etc.) was developed in the late 1940s and early 1950s by builders called Brady and Morton. They conflated and abbreviated the names resulting in the name Braemor.

=== Bottle Tower ===
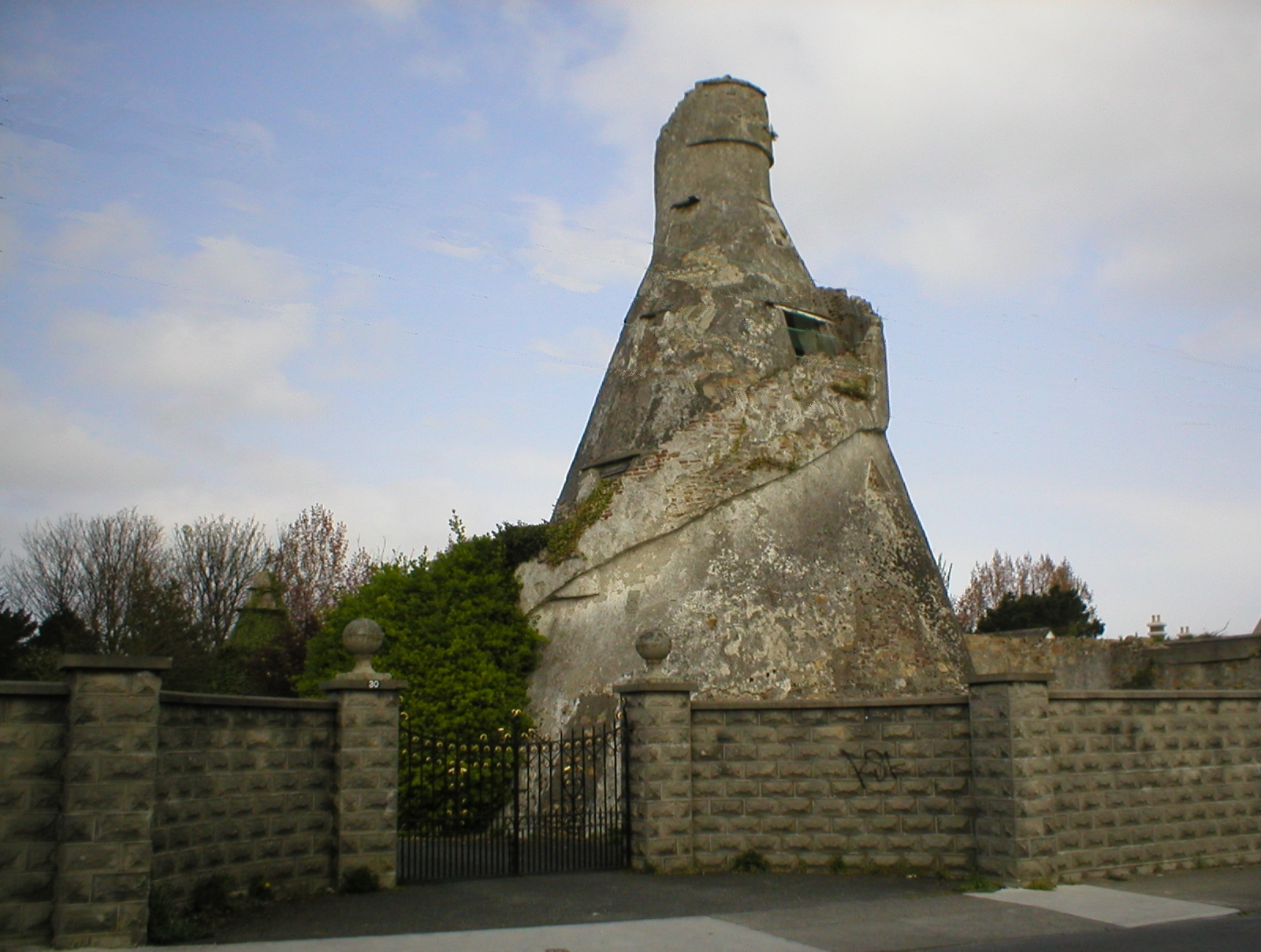
Bottle Tower

The Bottle Tower (or Hall's Barn) is a structure on Whitehall Road. It was built by Major Hall in 1742 in imitation of the better constructed Wonderful Barn erected about the same period near Leixlip. The floors and other timber work have long disappeared and the winding stone steps are not considered safe to ascend. While the ground floor may have been used as a barn, the first and second floors appear to have been habitable as they are both fitted with fireplaces. A smaller structure behind the barn, built on somewhat similar lines was a pigeon house.

The old house named Whitehall, which was demolished some years ago, stood adjacent to the barn. It was also built by Major Hall around the same time. In 1778 it became the residence of Rev. Jeremy Walsh, curate of Dundrum, and in 1795 it was converted into a boarding house by Mr. Ml. Kelly. A newspaper advertisement in 1816 invites enquiries from prospective visitors. In a description written in the last century the old-fashioned kitchen and panelled staircase are specially noted.

Lewis' Topographical Dictionary of Ireland (1837) features many of the old houses in Churchtown under the reference village of Rathfarnham. The houses include Landscape, of H. O'Callaghan, Esq.; Whitehall, of W. P. Matthews, Esq.; Newtown, of John Kirby, Esq., LL.D., M.D., in the grounds of which there are some very fine evergreens. Also included is Barton Lodge, of W. Conlan, Esq. which probably gave the name of Barton Road, Rathfarnam and Barton Road East, Churchtown. Nutgrove, of P. Jones, Esq. which was situated on Nutgrove Avenue, halfway between the Good Shepherd church and Rathfarnam village and Whitehall, of T. Laffan, Esq., an out-office of which is built in the shape of a pottery furnace, with a winding flight of steps on the outside to the top, whence there is a commanding prospect of the surrounding country repeats our description of the Bottle Tower.

Rocque’s 1760 map of Dublin shows Newtown House at the bottom on the South Dublin county council historical map site. To the left of Newtown (or south) and along The Glen river would be Landscape House and Whitehall House. Above these (or west) would be Nutgrove House – halfway to Rathfarnam village.

Taylor's 1816 map of the environs of Dublin gives a view of Churchtown, east of Ely's Demesne. This shows the present Landscape area, Newtown House (now Villas), Whitehall and Whitebarn. Landscape Road features between the Glen River and Newtown House and this seems to swing left onto modern day Braemor Road before meeting the modern day Dodder Park Road at Ely's Arch. Nutgrove School also features, then The Ponds and further south is Barton Lane.

William Duncan's maps of the county of Dublin (1821) shows White Barn and Newtown Villas. To the left of Newtown is a large house on what probably became Braemor Park. This was possibly Fetherstonaugh House which became the Church of Ireland Theological College or more likely Ardavon House which was the original Mount Carmel hospital building.

=== Berwick House ===
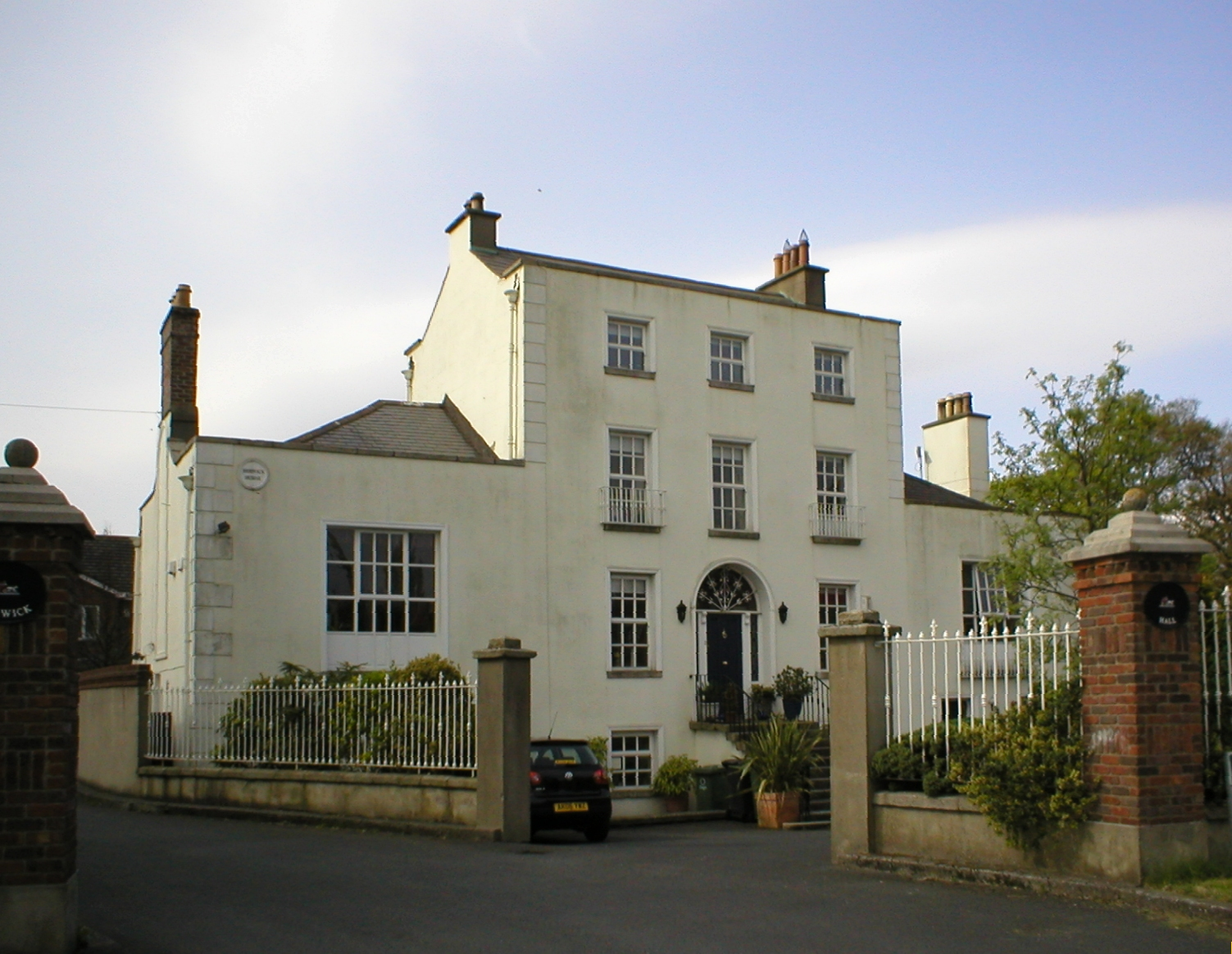
Berwick House

Berwick House is a tall building at the bend in Whitehall Road. Recently occupied by the De La Salle Brothers, it seems to be identical to a house named Waxfield where the death is recorded in 1766 of John Lamprey. In 1836 it was known as Hazelbrook, a name which was later transferred to the nearby, now defunct, Hughes Brothers milk bottling plant. The Hughes Brothers original house, built in 1898, and called Hazelbrook House, was rebuilt in the Bunratty Folk Park in 2001. From 1844 to 1899 it was known as Bachelor's Hall, after which it became the headquarters of a Charitable Institution under the name of Berwick Home. In 1944 it again became a private residence and the name was changed to Berwick House.

=== The Ponds ===
Loreto Terrace on the north side of Rathfarnam's Loreto Abbey was formerly known as "the Ponds", a name originating apparently from the large pond which two hundred years ago occupied the low-lying field between Loreto Terrace and Nutgrove Avenue. This area was described in Weston St. John Joyce's The Neighbourhood of Dublin in 1912 as the "dilapidated locality known as the Ponds" but it has since been largely rebuilt. An old photograph from Larry O'Connor's collection shows what it looked like at that time. The last of the old houses was demolished in the mid-1980s. It was a very early 18th century gabled residence named Grove Cottage and was probably the oldest occupied house in Dublin. This place was the scene of a skirmish at the outbreak of the rising of 1798. The insurgents of the south county assembled at the Ponds on 24 May 1798 under the leadership of David Keely, James Byrne, Edward Keogh and Ledwich. The latter two had been members of Lord Ely's yeomanry but had taken to the field with the United Irishmen. The insurgents were attacked by the local yeomanry corps but were able to defend themselves and the yeomanry was forced to retreat. A party of regular troops was then sent against them and a stiff encounter took place. A number of the insurgents were killed or wounded and some prisoners taken including Keogh and Ledwich. The survivors retreated, joining up with a party from Clondalkin, and a further engagement took place at the turnpike on the Rathcoole road where the enemy was successfully repulsed.

== Culture ==
=== Religion ===
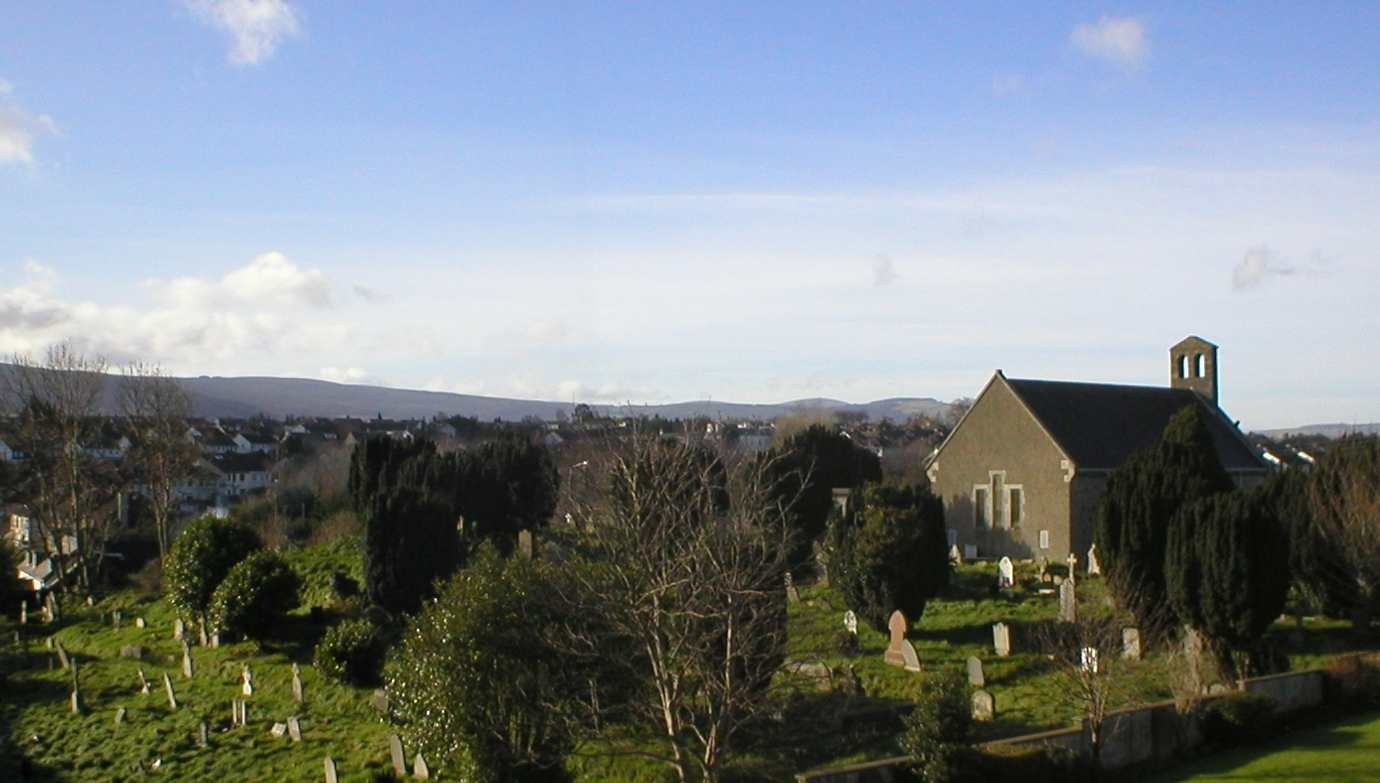
St. Nahi's church and graveyard

The suburb of Churchtown is probably named after St. Nahi's Church (Church of Ireland) just off the Churchtown road. It is more easily viewed these days from the William Dargan Bridge, close to Dundrum village. St. Nahi's was rebuilt several times—in 950, 1650 and 1750. The present restoration was completed in 1910. The public housing flats in Churchtown, across from the Bottle Tower pub, are named St. Nathy's after the church. The baptismal font in St. Nahi's Church church was moved there from St. Kevin's church and is the same font that was used to baptise Arthur Wellesley, The Duke of Wellington in 1769.

The local Roman Catholic church is the Good Shepherd Church. It was the site of the state funeral of former Taoiseach Seán Lemass, who lived on Hillside Drive.

The Church of Ireland Theological Institute (the theological seminary of the Church of Ireland) and the Representative Church Body Library (the central library of the Church of Ireland) are both on Braemor Park, Churchtown.

The Quakers have a Meeting House on the Lower Churchtown Road.

=== Education ===
The Good Shepherd National School is a co-educational national school in the parish of Churchtown while the mixed secondary school is De La Salle College. The De La Salle Brothers are the trustees of the college and it is under the control of a board of management. The school's past pupils include Damien Duff, who retired from the Republic of Ireland national football team in 2012. Jim Stynes who won an All-Ireland Minor (under 18) football championship medal for Dublin in 1984, and the Brownlow medal in Australian Rules Football in 1991. Jim's younger brother, Brian Stynes, also went to De La Salle College; he won a senior All Ireland football medal for Dublin in 1995. Des Fitzgerald, the former Irish international prop forward and father of current international player Luke, is a past pupil of DLS National and DLS College. He played in Croke Park in 1968 as a member of the DLS N.S. (old name for The Good Shepherd National School) Gaelic football team and in Lansdowne Road for the DLS Senior Rugby team later in 1975. Another player on both teams was John Treacy, the former Dublin Hurling full-back and father of current Dublin Hurling star, David Treacy.

The former local girls' secondary school was Notre Dame School, one of whose alumni is Mary Lou McDonald, the current president of Sinn Féin and a Teachta Dála (TD).

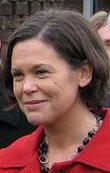
Mary Lou McDonald

McDonald was a Member of the European Parliament (MEP), from 2004 to 2009 representing the Dublin constituency (Leaving Certificate class of 1988). On the 19th Oct 2016, The Notre Dame Schools Trust announced that the school would close, due to a lack of funding, and outstanding debts. The Department of Education acquired the Notre Dame campus and will use it for school purposes in the future.

A number of local schools have past-pupil associations, like Ballinteer Community School, De La Salle College, and The High School.

==== Former school ====
A De La Salle Preparatory School, now closed, was located in Camberley House (also known as Inish More or Inish Ealga) on the Churchtown Road Upper. A previous owner was the widow of Éamonn Ceannt, one of the signatories of the Proclamation of the Irish Republic. Camberley House was bought for the De La Salle boys' school and later developed as the preparatory school when the secondary school moved to its present location.

=== Health ===
Mount Carmel Community Hospital, which stands on a 4.9-acre site on Braemor Park, re-opened as a short-stay nursing home in September 2015.

=== Sport ===
Sports clubs in the area include Leicester Celtic and Broadford Rovers association football clubs, Dundrum South Dublin Athletic Club, Phoenix gymnastics club, Old Alex Hockey Club, De La Salle Palmerstown rugby club, and Sandyford Cricket Club. Local cycling clubs include Orwell Wheelers and South Dublin Cycling Club. There are also hiking clubs like Hill Top Treks and The Bog Trotters. Castle golf club and Milltown golf club are also nearby.

Gaelic games are played at Ballinteer St Johns GAA Club, CLG Baile Buadáin Naomh Éanna, Kilmacud Crokes GAA, and Naomh Olaf GAA Club. Churchtown GAA Club (or Baile An Chlochain) is now defunct.

=== Ice cream ===
Churchtown was home to the HB Dairy. HB Ice Cream was named after the Hughes Brothers dairy and was produced at Hazelbrook Farm, across the road from the Good Shepherd national school.

== Governance ==
Churchtown is largely within the administrative area of Dún Laoghaire—Rathdown County Council, though its northern boundary directly borders the Dublin City Council administrative area to its north near Rathgar. Churchtown is part of the Dáil Éireann constituency of Dublin Rathdown.

== People ==
- Baz Ashmawy, television personality
- Séamus Brennan, Fianna Fáil politician and Teachta Dála (TD) for the Dublin South constituency
- William Tankerville Chamberlain, judge, lived in Churchtown
- Ruth Coppinger, Dublin West TD, was born and raised in Churchtown
- Dick Farrelly, songwriter, policeman and poet
- Fionnula Flanagan, actress who lived in Churchtown before settling in Los Angeles
- Maria Gatland (née McGuire), is a councillor and former cabinet member for education in Croydon London Borough Council, a post she resigned from after being exposed as a former member of the Irish Republican Army (IRA).
- Into Paradise a band whose members, David Long, Ronan Clarke, Rachael Tighe and James Eadie, were from the Churchtown area. They named their 1991 album "Churchtown".
- John Kavanagh, martial artist and coach of UFC fighter Conor McGregor
- Dermot Keely, footballer and former manager of Shelbourne FC. Although not born or raised in Churchtown, he was employed in De La Salle Churchtown for several years.
- Dervla Kirwan, actress who starred in Goodnight Sweetheart and Ballykissangel
- Seán Lemass, Fianna Fáil politician and third Taoiseach of Ireland from 1959 until 1966
- Maureen O'Hara, an Irish film actress and singer, was born Maureen FitzSimons on the Lower Churchtown Road.
- Martina Shanahan (born 1966), one of the Winchester Three, an IRA active service unit, who was given a 25-year sentence for conspiring to kill Britain's Secretary of State for Northern Ireland, Tom King, in 1987.
- John Millington Synge, playwright who was born in Newtown Villas, off Braemor Road, and lived here until his family moved to Dún Laoghaire in 1888.
- John Wilson, a Fianna Fáil politician and All-Ireland football medal winner for Cavan, lived on Braemor Avenue.
- Elizabeth Yeats and Lily Yeats sisters, founders of Cuala Press at Churchtown after it was reorganised separately from Dun Emer Press. Sisters of Jack and William Butler Yeats, they lived at Gurteen Dheas, Churchtown Road, which was also the site of Cuala Industries.

== See also ==
- List of towns and villages in Ireland
