= Movies@ =

Irish cinema chain

Movies@ Ltd. is a cinema chain in Ireland. The company opened its first multiplex cinema at the Dundrum Town Centre on 1 October 2005, with 12 screens. Other sites include the Pavilions Centre, Swords (11 screens) which opened in mid November 2006, the Square in Tallaght in December 2021 and Gorey, Co. Wexford. A branch was proposed to be located in Salthill, County Galway (10 screens) in Autumn 2007, but has not yet opened.

The company bears some resemblance to the largest Irish cinema chain, the Ward Anderson group, in that it is a family owned business run by members of two families, in this case the O'Gorman family (who ran the Ormonde Cinema in Stillorgan) and the Spurling family who are also involved in rural cinemas, albeit having closed one (Enniscorthy) due to being in relative proximity to a Movies@ site.
