= Dundrum Town Centre =

Large shopping centre in Dublin, Ireland

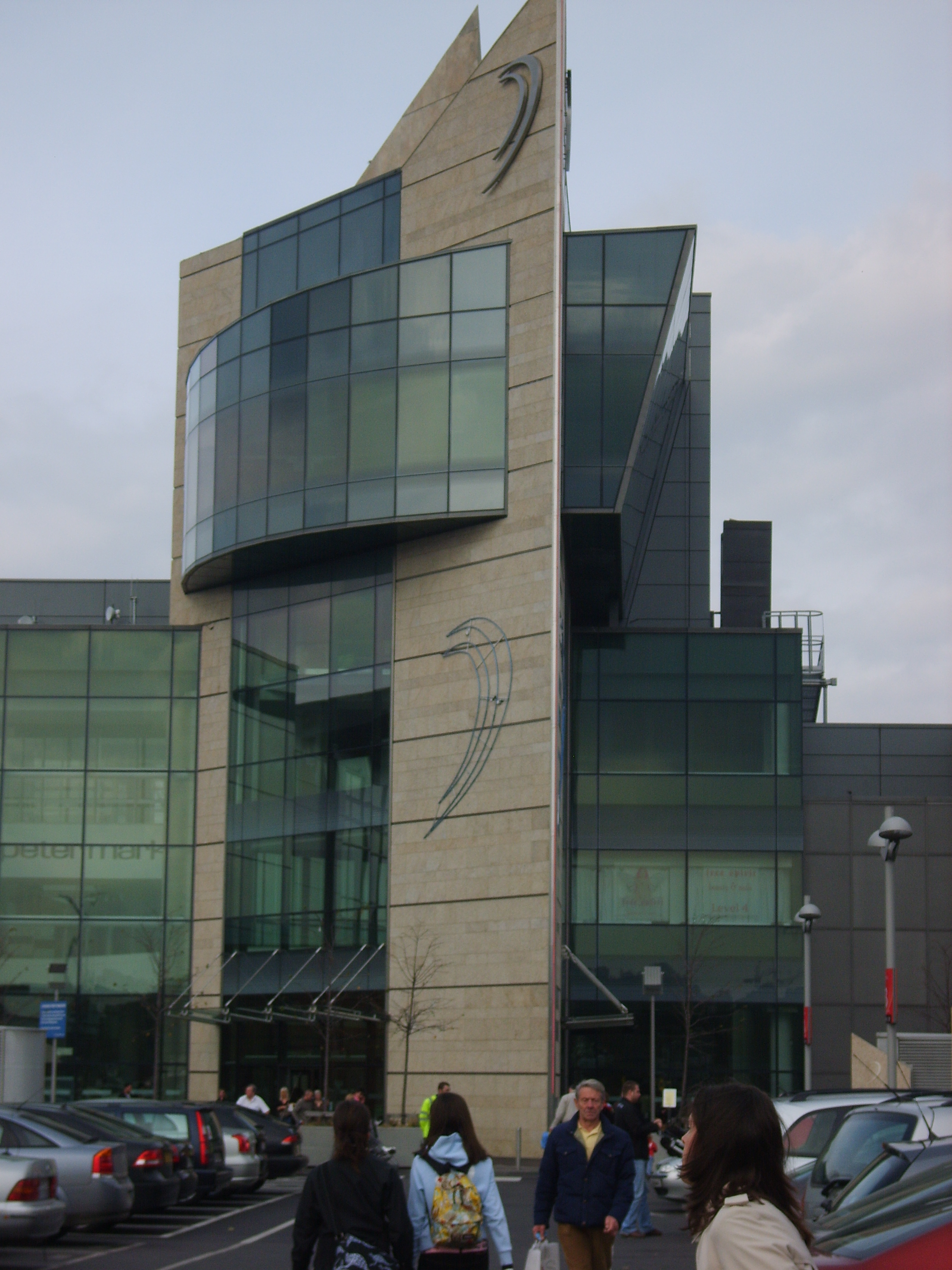
- Dundrum Town Centre (Dundrum South entrance)
- Location: Dundrum, Dublin, Ireland
- Coordinates: 53°17′10″N 6°14′30″W
- Address: Dundrum Town Centre; Sandyford Road
- Opened: 3 March 2005
- Owner: Hammerson and Allianz
- Architect: Burke - Kennedy Doyle Architects, Dublin, Ireland
- Num. of stores: 160
- Num. of anchor tenants: 5
- Floor area: (Retail floor space) 111,484 m^{2} (1,200,000 sq ft) (Total floor space) 140,000 m^{2} (1,500,000 sq ft)
- Floors: 4 (main levels)
- Parking: 3,000
- Public transit: Luas Green Line (Balally / Dundrum); Dublin Bus routes: 14, 44, 44B, 44D, 74, L25; Go-Ahead Ireland routes: 161, S6
- Website: dundrum.ie

Dundrum Town Centre (alternatively shortened as Dundrum Town as of 2026) is a shopping centre located in Dundrum, Dublin, Ireland. It is one of Ireland's two largest shopping centres with over 131 shops, 47 restaurants, 3 amusement facilities and a cinema, retail floor space of 111,484 m^{2} (1,200,000 sq ft) and almost 140,000 m^{2} (1,500,000 sq ft) total floor space, and over 3,000 car parking spaces. It is located just south of the centre of the suburban village of Dundrum, within the wider eponymous area. It has annual footfall in excess of 18 million.

== History ==
Dundrum Town Centre was built on the site of the former Pye factory, later the site of an entertainment and bowling centre called Dundrum Bowl. In 1993, the Dundrum Bowl was closed due to flooding.

The shopping centre was opened on 3 March 2005. Over 5,000 people queued in the main square. Within 3 years, over 70 million people visited Dundrum Town Centre.

The centre has been extended in phases and is divided into various districts. It is divided into areas its management labels "districts" - the "Gallery", located in the main building, "Pembroke", around the Mill Pond feature, and "Dundrum South", located outside the main Tesco overground car park.

Dundrum Town Centre was evacuated shortly before 8pm on 24 October 2011 after floodwaters surged through the doors. The owner of a Mexican restaurant in the complex said five feet of water had rushed down steps towards his business, causing thousands of euro worth of damage.

In July 2016, the UK commercial property firm Hammerson bought control of Dundrum from Allianz for a reported £1.01 billion, and now owns it jointly with Allianz Real Estate.

In 2019, plans emerged that a new bowling alley called Stella Bowl would open in the Pembroke Square district in the former Hamleys unit, the unit laid dormant for a few years and the bowling alley opened under a different operator, Lane7, in January 2025.

In 2020, anchor tenant House of Fraser announced that they would close their store in the centre. The unit was halved into 2 units across the 4 levels of the centre with Brown Thomas opening a new department store in 2022, while Penneys relocated from its then-current store in the centre into a new flagship store in 2023.

In 2020, an expansion was announced for the centre, at the Pembroke Square district, the expansion would host a concept Donnybrook Fair store and restaurant that opened in 2021. In 2026, the retailer's owner Musgrave Group announced that the store would close permanently. The unit would be split into 2.

== Stores ==
Dundrum Town Centre contains a range of retail, restaurant and entertainment tenants, many stores being the first in Ireland or their flagship locations. Anchor tenants at Dundrum include Tesco, Marks and Spencer, Brown Thomas, Penneys, Dunnes Stores, Zara Home, and Next.

Entertainment venues include a Movies@ cinema, Mill Theatre Dundrum, Rainforest Adventure Golf and a Lane7 bowling alley. A temporary ice-skating rink is operational during some of the Winter months to host 'Dundrum on Ice', which starts in October.

There are many food and drink options in the centre, such as a food court on level 3 of the centre and pop-up food vendors in the 'Town Centre Square' district in addition to permanent ones.

The centre is laid out in multiple districts, including the 'Main Mall' where most retail units reside across 4 main floors, 'Dundrum South' where Elverys Sports, and TK Maxx are located, 'Pembroke Square' where there is a range of food and beverage options, and 'Town Centre Square' to which the millpond is located, where dancing water displays occur in the pond.

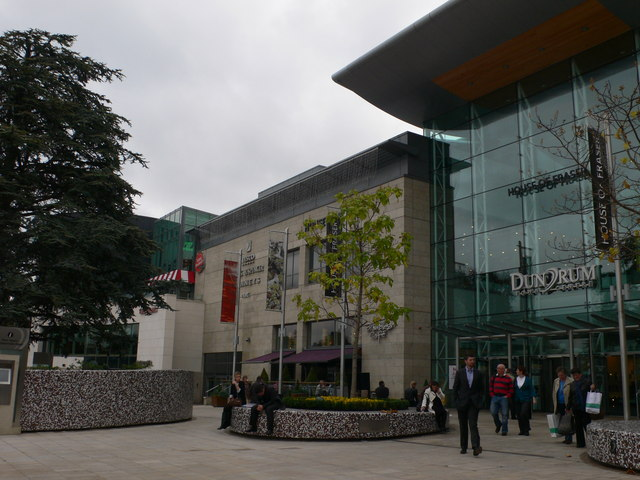
Dundrum Town Centre's 'Town Centre Square' entrance

== Proposed expansion ==
There have been plans to redevelop the old Dundrum shopping centre, now Dundrum Village Centre, described as "phase 2" of the Town Centre overall plan, to add on a further 50,000 sq m of retail and dining, and a hotel. Such plans were put on hold back in 2015, after the 2011 flooding of the current centre led to concerns flood defence of an expanded centre. In 2019, the new co-owners of the centre, Hammerson, revived plans to redevelop the old Dundrum Shopping Centre, opting for a mixed development, to include an anchor store, further retail stores and dining facilities, and over 800 apartments including one high rise tower.

== Name ==
"Dundrum Town Centre" was originally a local government term, defined by Dún Laoghaire–Rathdown County Council, before the shopping centre was built. It was described as "the area between the Luas line, the Dundrum Relief Road, the Taney Road / Upper Churchtown Road junction, and the Wyckham By-Pass Route. It is mainly zoned for "town centre" uses, but with some parts zoned residential." The shopping centre was built under the provisions of the Urban Structure Plan for the Dundrum Town Centre zone.

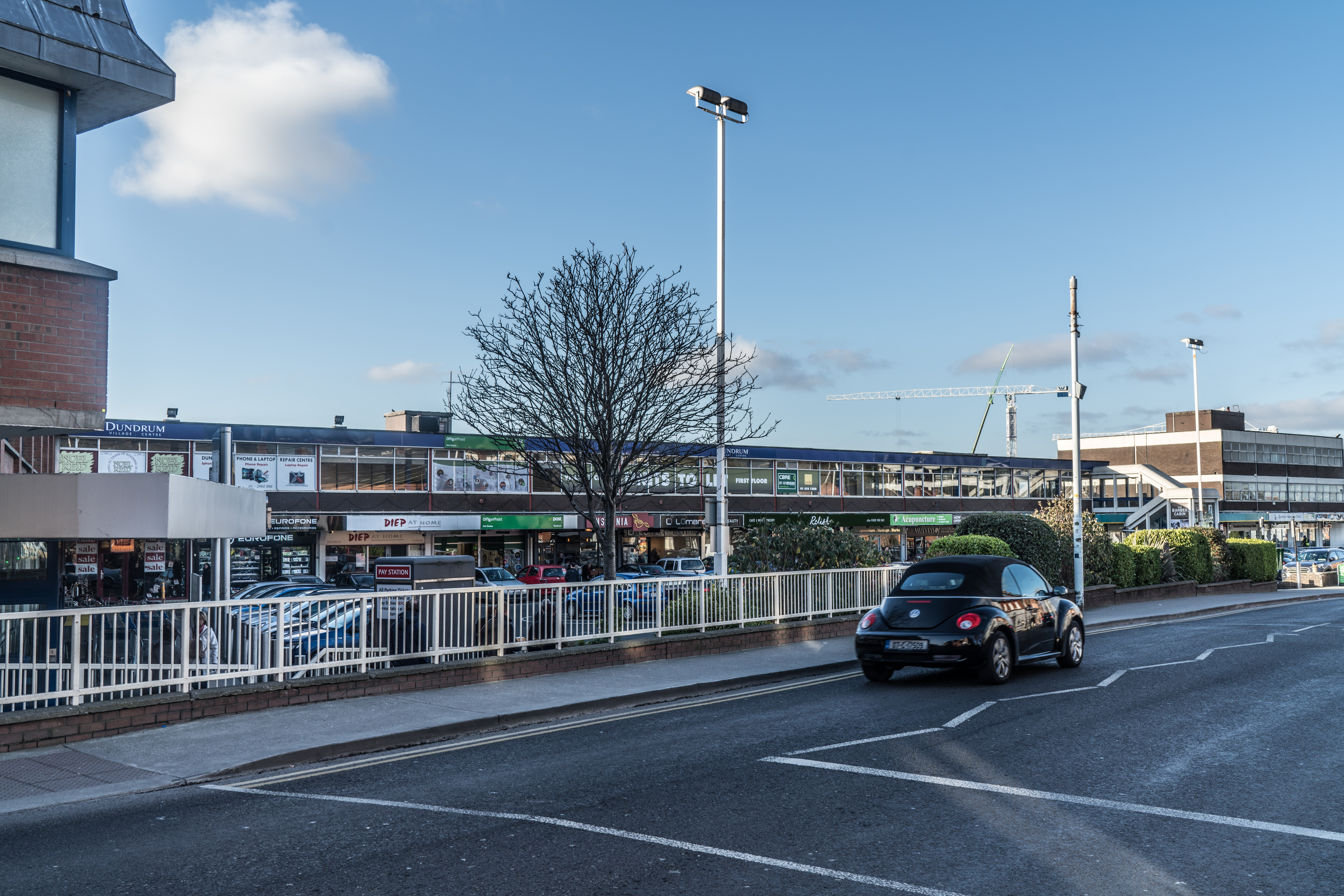
The original centre, now known as Dundrum Village Centre

The name 'Dundrum Shopping Centre' referred to an older, smaller, shopping centre off Main Street in Dundrum, which is still open, and home to Lidl, Dealz and Mulveys of Dundrum. Following many years of decay, efforts have been made to revamp this area and it is now known as 'Dundrum Village Centre'. Currently, the entire second floor is abandoned.

== Public transport ==
The centre is served by the Luas green line, the closest stop is Balally but it is also close to Dundrum stop. It is also served by Dublin Bus routes 14, 44, 44b, 44d, 74, and L25, whilst Go-Ahead Ireland operate routes S6 and 161.

== Media ==
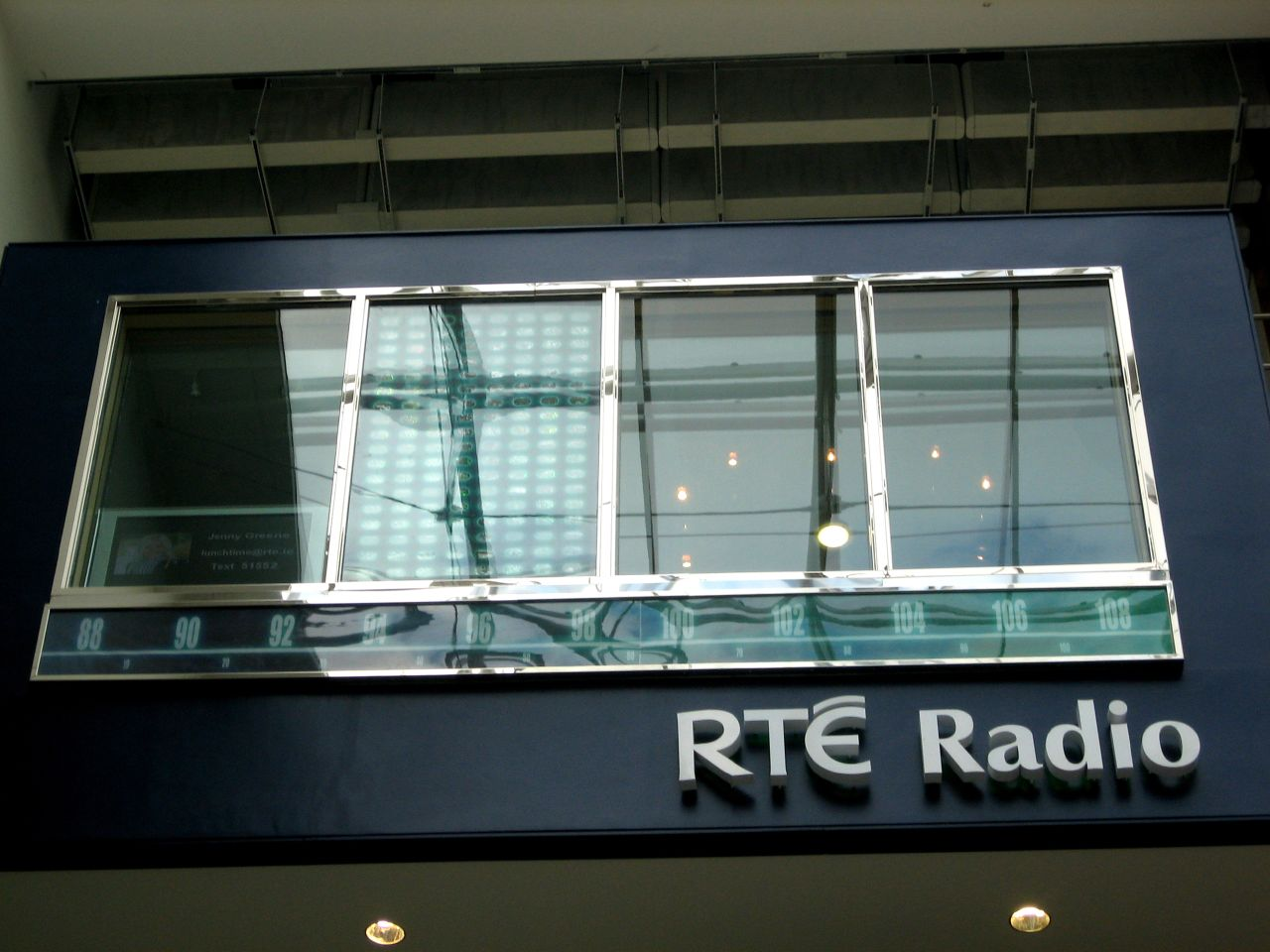
RTÉ studio in Dundrum Town Centre

Dublin South FM 93.9 is a local BAI-licensed community based radio station for South Dublin, which started broadcasting in 1995 from the old PYE centre, and also broadcast from Rathfarnham. It moved to broadcast from purpose-built studios in the Dundrum Town Centre, with about 60 volunteers producing and broadcasting 35 hours of programmes each week. Transition Year students from local schools also get involved, as well as media students. Communicorp also have a studio in Dundrum Town Centre with 98fm, SPIN 1038, NewsTalk and Today FM regularly broadcasting from it.

An in-house television channel, "Dundrum Television", was launched by RTÉ in 2005, and used to broadcast advertising and other programming.

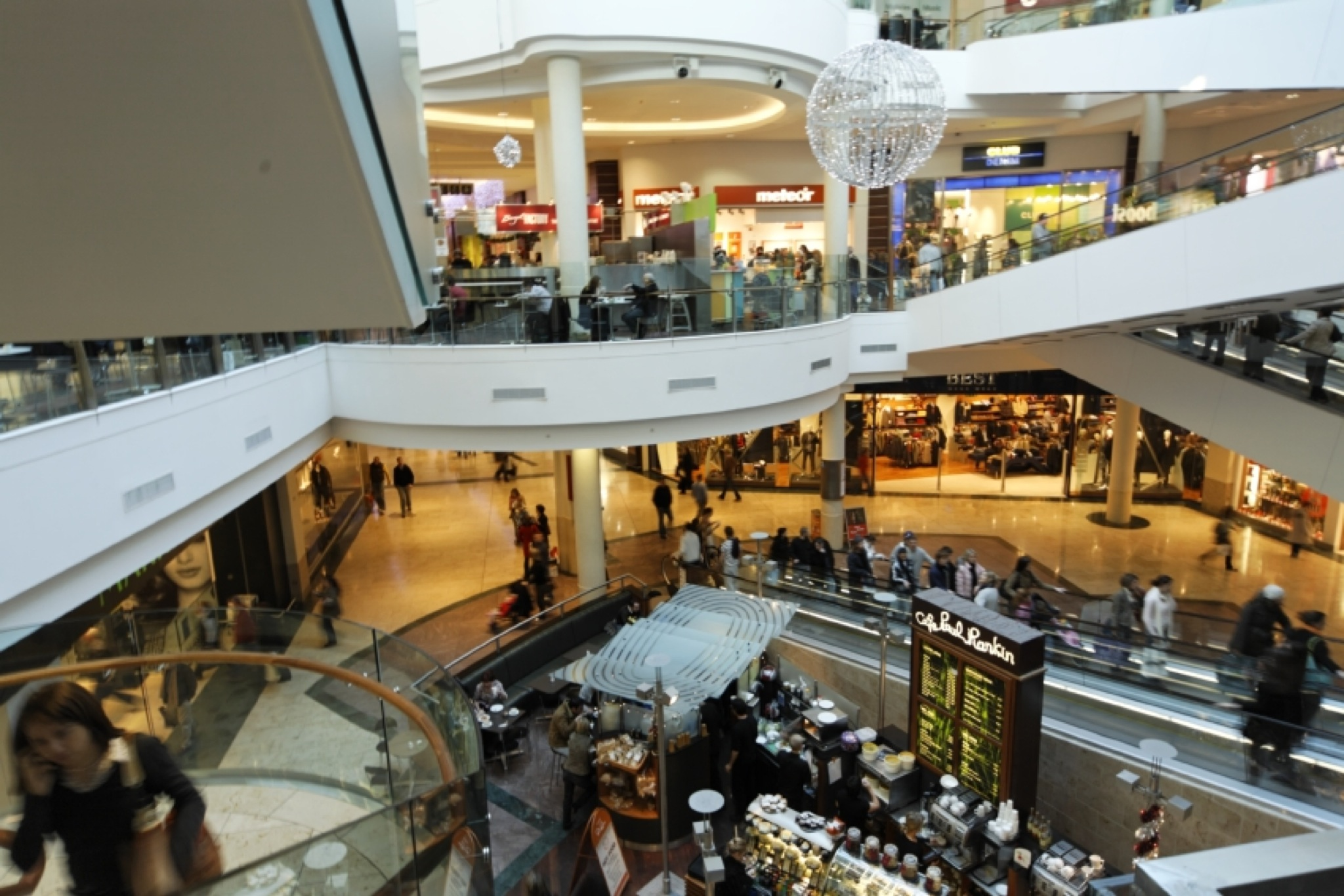
Interior of Dundrum Town Centre

== Awards ==
By the end of 2009, Dundrum Town Centre had won 30 national and international awards. In April 2007, it was named, from a longlist of 24 and shortlist of 3, as the ICSC (International Council of Shopping Centres) European Shopping Centre of the year for 2007 at their European conference in Warsaw, after shopping centres throughout Europe were visited, with assessment criteria including tenant mix, community integration, vision, customer service ethos, management systems and sustainability. In 2009, it was awarded "Shopping Centre of the Year" for the third year running at the FBD Retail Excellence Awards, as voted by shopping centre retailers throughout Ireland.

In 2011, Dundrum Town Centre was awarded the county's first Ecocert certification. In 2019, it was named 'Shopping Complex of the Year', at the Irish Hospitality Awards.
