= John McCann (footballer, born 1867) =

Scottish footballer

Personal information
- Full name: John McCann
- Date of birth: 6 September 1867
- Place of birth: Uphall, Scotland
- Date of death: 1944 (aged 76–77)
- Position: Inside forward

Senior career*
| Years | Team | Apps | (Gls) |
| 1889–1890 | Broxburn Shamrock | | |
| 1890 | Bathgate Rovers | | |
| 1890–1891 | Newcastle West End | | |
| 1891–1892 | Broxburn Shamrock | | |
| 1892 | Celtic | | |
| 1892–1893 | Hibernian | | |
| 1893–1894 | Preston North End | 6 | (1) |
| 1894 | Broxburn Shamrock | | |
- * Club domestic league appearances and goals

John McCann (6 September 1867 – 1944) was a Scottish footballer who played in the Football League for Preston North End.
