= Winchester Three =

The Winchester Three were three young Irish citizens (Martina Shanahan, Finbar Cullen and John McCann) who were found guilty in 1988 of a plot to murder British politician Tom King, who was the Northern Ireland Secretary at the time, and sentenced to 25 years in prison. Their convictions were later quashed by the Court of Appeal, after having served two-and-a-half years. The decision was criticised by Lord Denning.

Shanahan died on February 17, 2021.
