= Dundrum, Dublin =

Suburb of Dublin, Ireland

Dundrum Dún Droma (Irish)
- Suburb
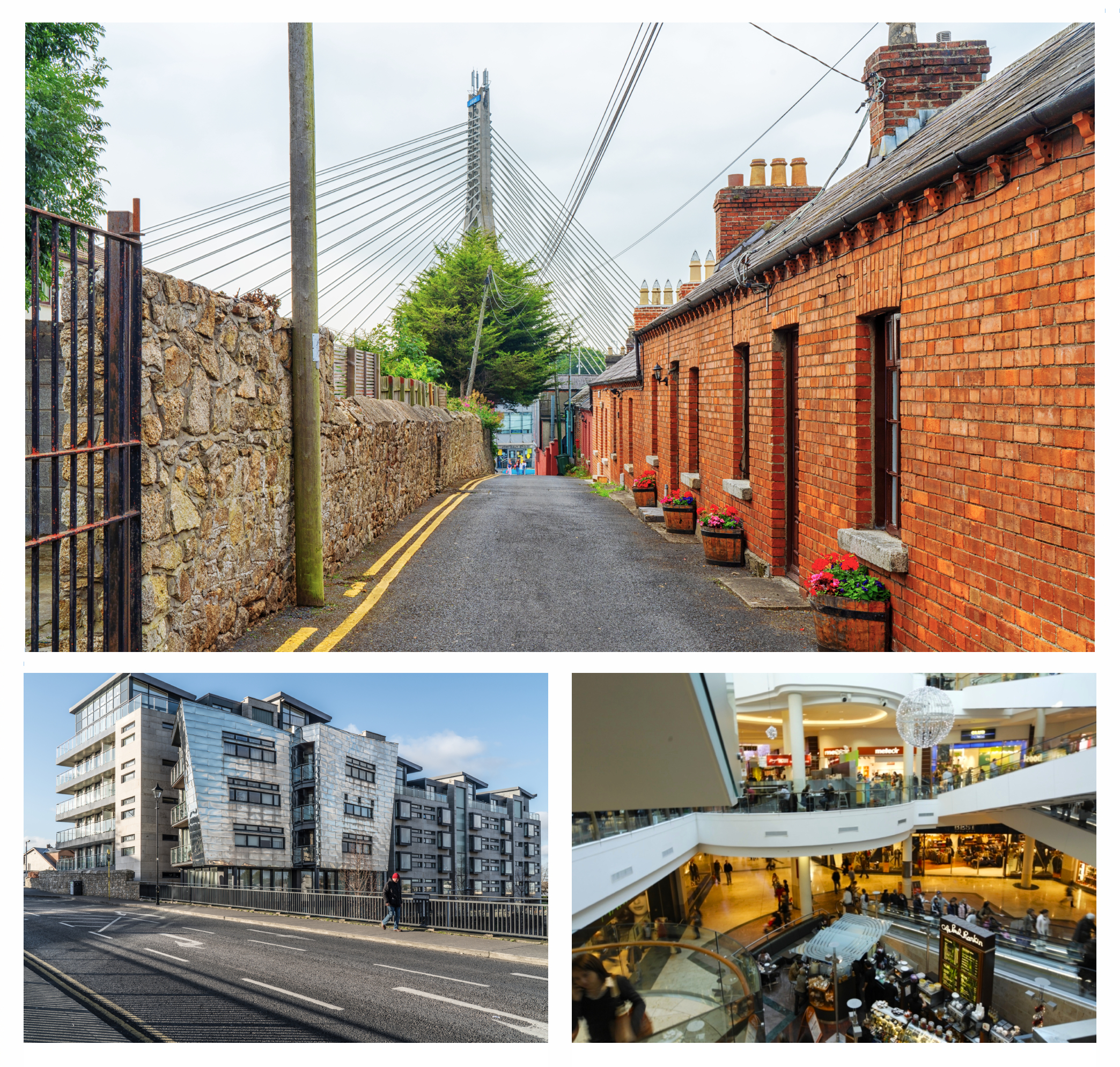
- Clockwise from top: William Dargan Bridge as seen from Victoria Terrace; the interior of Dundrum Town Centre; "The Laurels" apartment complex in central Dundrum

- Location in Dublin Dundrum (Ireland)
- Coordinates: 53°17′23″N 6°14′39″W
- Country: Ireland
- Province: Leinster
- County: Dún Laoghaire–Rathdown
- Time zone: UTC±0 (WET)
  - Summer (DST): UTC+1 (IST)
- Eircode routing key: D14, D16
- Telephone area code: +353(0)1

Dundrum (Irish: Dún Droma, meaning 'the ridge fort'), originally a village in its own right, is an outer suburb of Dublin, Ireland. Dundrum is located in the local authority area of Dún Laoghaire–Rathdown County Council and the postal districts of Dublin 14 and Dublin 16. The area is home to the Dundrum Town Centre, the largest shopping centre in Ireland.

== History ==
One of the earliest mentions of the area concerns the location of the original St. Nahi's Church in the 8th century on which site today's 18th-century church currently stands. The ancient name for Dundrum is "Taney" which derives from Tigh Naithi meaning the house or place of Nath Í.

Modern archaeological excavations near the church have revealed three enclosures associated with the church, the earliest dating from the 6th century, and one of the finds included an almost complete Flemish Redware jug from the 13th century.

The first reference to the placename of Taney occurs in the Charter of St. Laurence O'Toole to Christchurch in 1178 as "half of Rathnahi" and in the following year in a Papal bull of Pope Alexander III to the same archbishop as "Medietatem de Tignai". Variations of the spelling continued until the mid-16th century.

When the Normans arrived in 1169, a series of fortifications were built around Dublin. A castle was built in Dundrum as part of this series of outer fortifications around the 13th century. Later in 1590, a newer castle was built by Richard Fitzwilliam as part of a strategic line of castles within the Pale. The original village clustered around Dundrum Castle and was a rural defensive outpost against assaults and raids from Irish tribes and families such as the O'Tooles and the O'Byrnes. In 1619, a relation, William FitzWilliam, 3rd Viscount FitzWilliam was granted the castle in recognition of his courage while defending against these assaults but was driven out in 1642. He returned by 1646 but left again, never to return, in 1653. His family held onto the Fitzwilliam seat until 1790. The castle was never reoccupied and exists today as ruins overlooking the Dundrum bypass and the shopping centre. Excavations in 1989 recovered green glazed pottery known as "Leinster Ware", shells from oysters and cockles, animal bones, and shards of pottery from Saintongue in France probably used for storing wine.

The arrival of Richard Fitzwilliam and the building of the castle established commercial activity in the region. The village was home to "The Manor Mill" where corn was ground into flour. An overflow waterfall was also used by a paper mill and an ironworks.

In 1813, the original Roman Catholic church (Holy Cross) on Main Street was built. It was replaced by a larger building in 1878 and marked when Dundrum was constituted a separate parish from the area previously covered by Booterstown. A large extension was built in 1956. The church is built in a Gothic style from Dublin granite with Portland and Bath stone used for the surrounds of windows and doors.

In 1818, Christ Church (Church of Ireland) on Taney Road was opened as a replacement for a smaller church that stood on the same site. Selling pew sites raised funding for the new building, and the sale of 18 pews on the ground and 8 on the gallery raised nearly £400. The architect for the new church was William Farrell.

In the summer of 1846, Thomas Carlyle travelled from Scotland to Dundrum to spend time with his close friend Charles Gavan Duffy, one of the co-founders of Young Ireland. Joining Duffy were "most of the writers and orators on whom their contemporaries bestowed the sobriquet of Young Ireland".

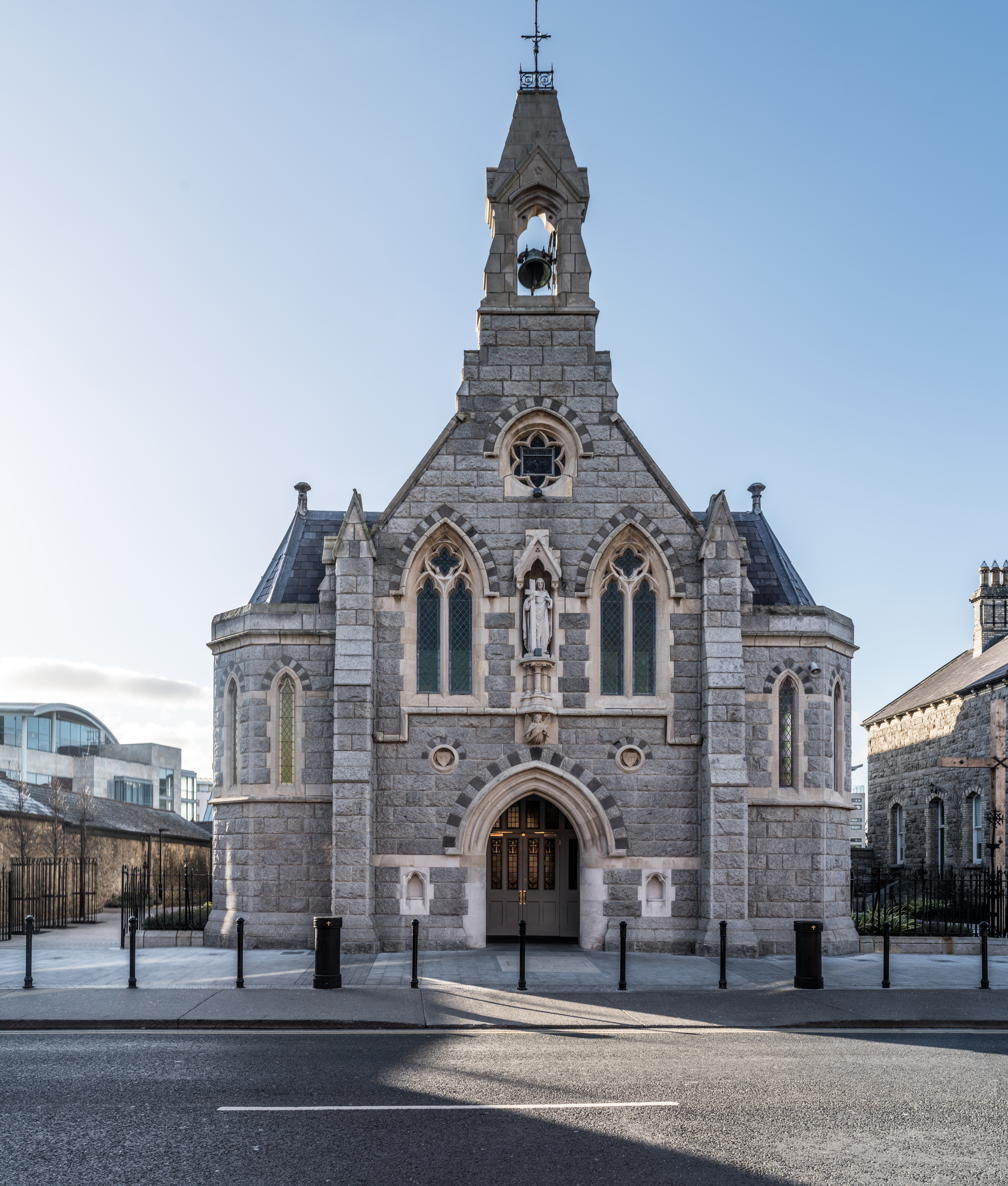
Holy Cross Church

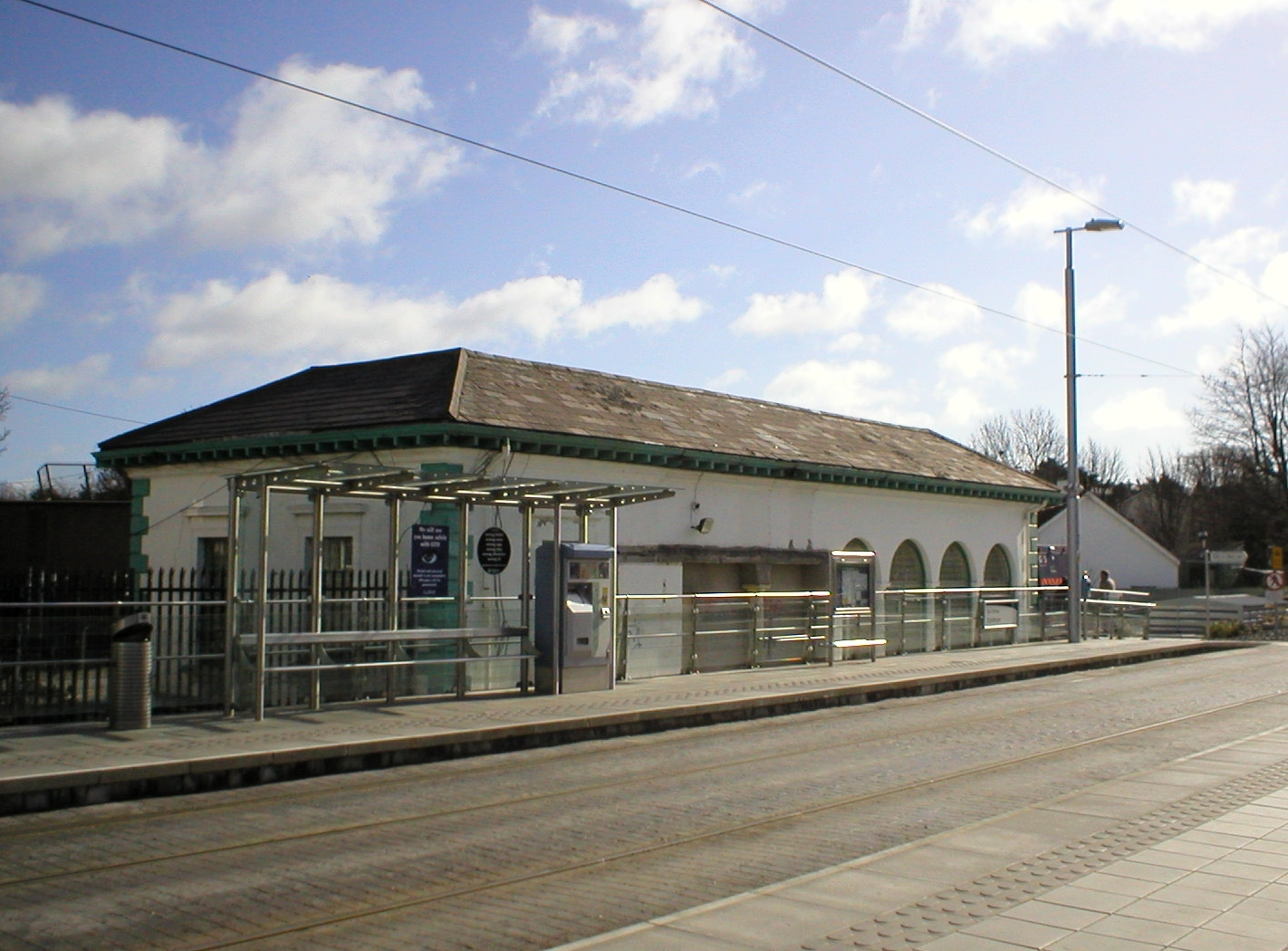
The original Dundrum station built by William Dargan in 1854 behind the modern Luas stop.

The village expanded greatly after the arrival of the Dublin and South Eastern Railway (DSER) in 1854. By 1876, the Manor Mill became a laundry and was the largest employer of female labour in the region, The laundry hooter was a regular sound in its day, and would sound at 7.50 am for thirty seconds, then at 8 am to start work, and also at 13.50, 14.00, and finally at 16.50 and 17.00.

In 1881, a local builder, John Richardson, erected 26 cottages known as the Pembroke Cottages. The Manor Mill Laundry bought six of these cottages for its workers.

In 1893, a Dublin solicitor named Trevor Overend purchased a 19th-century farmhouse. Today, this building is named Airfield House and is open to the public.

The Dun Emer Press was founded at Dundrum by Elizabeth Yeats, assisted by her brother William Butler Yeats, in 1903.

In 1914, a Carnegie Library was opened by the then Lord Chancellor. Originally, the library was used as an entertainment facility for the community and the upper floor was equipped with a stage and even a kitchen. The building was also used as a school until the 1950s.

== Development ==
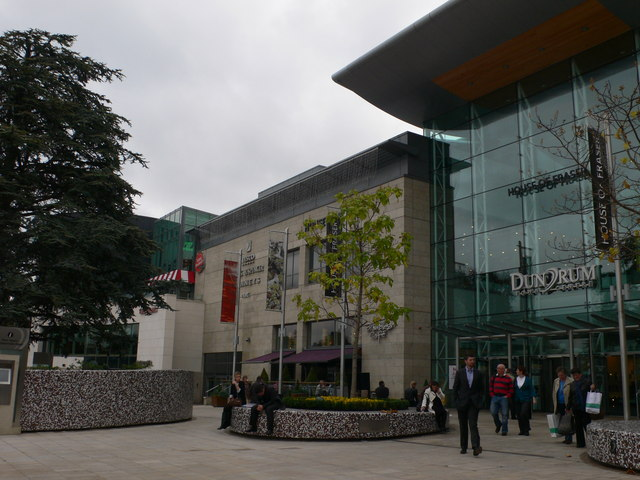
Dundrum Shopping Centre Opened in 2005 when Ireland was booming, this is the largest shopping centre in Ireland.

In 1971, Dundrum was one of the earliest places in Ireland to open a purpose-built shopping centre (the first being in Stillorgan). A much bigger shopping centre opened just south of Dundrum in March 2005. Known as Dundrum Town Centre, it contains within the complex one of the largest cinemas in Ireland, opened in early October 2005. Plans to redevelop the old shopping centre included proposed space for hotels, apartments and more retail outlets. However this was postponed and the older retail units were leased to new tenants, and the old 'Dundrum Shopping Centre' was rebranded as 'Dundrum Village Centre'.

== Amenities ==
In the village centre are the old shopping centre, with a Lidl supermarket, an Insomnia cafe, a furniture store and a butcher's shop. Across the road to one side is the Dundrum College of Further Education (operated by the local Education and Training Board), while to the other side is the public library. The Dundrum Town Centre contains a wide range of shops and service outlets.

== Transport ==
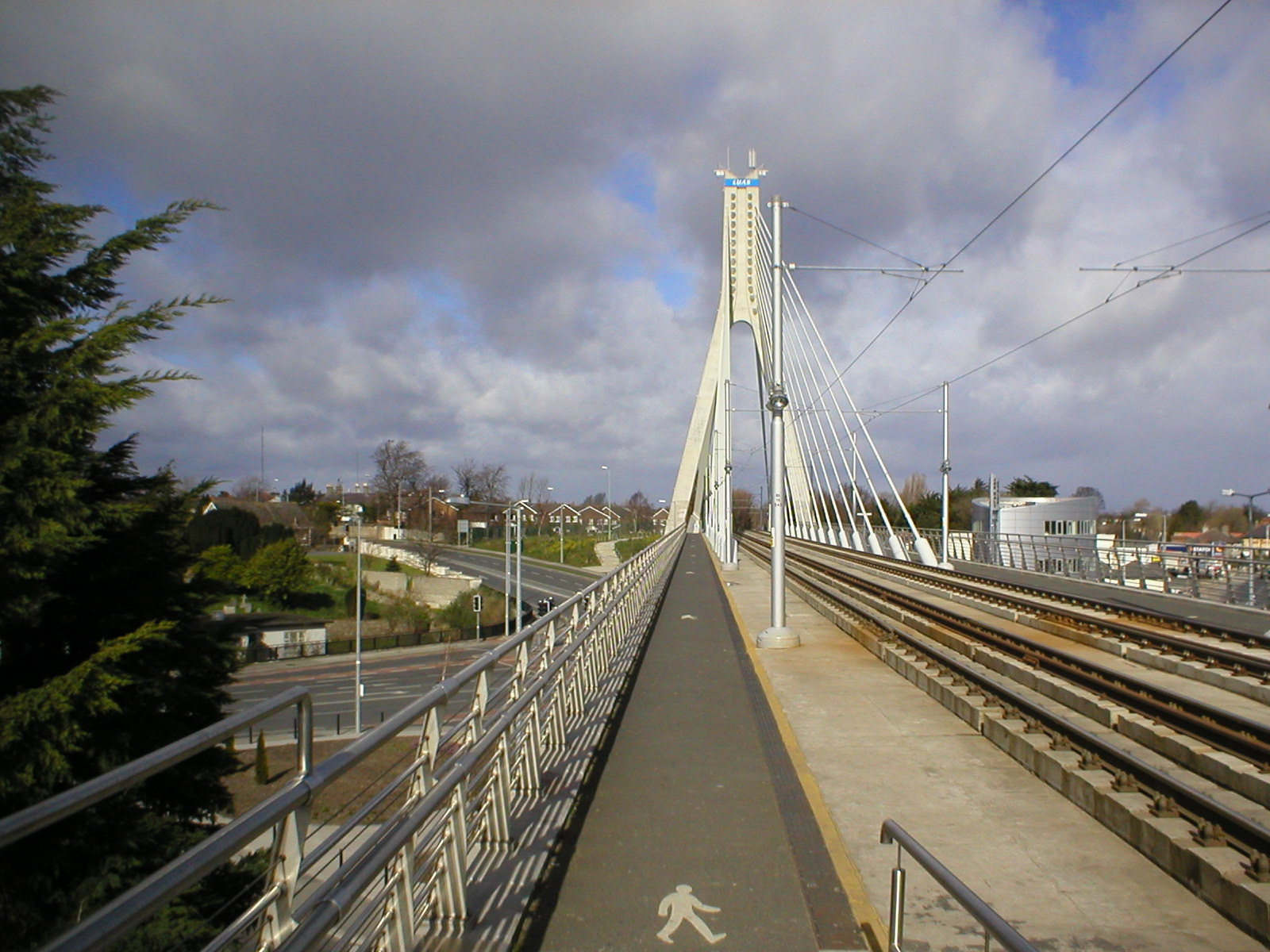
The William Dargan bridge at Dundrum

=== Luas ===
The Luas Green Line has two stops in Dundrum, Balally (which serves the shopping centre) and Dundrum, before the line passes over the large cable-stayed William Dargan Bridge, at Taney Cross. It is the largest engineering structure on the line.

The Luas route substantially follows the original Harcourt Street railway line, which was operated by the DSER from Dublin to Bray. Closed in 1958, the alignment was preserved intact for several decades until it was taken over by the Luas. Dundrum railway station opened on 10 July 1854 and closed on 1 January 1959.

The planned Dublin Metro, Metrolink was proposed to stop at Dundrum's Luas stop on its way from Swords to Sandyford. If completed according to original proposals, MetroLink would replace the current Luas services that run along the Luas Green Line. As of February 2019 however, it was questioned whether these plans would be completed as proposed.

=== Bus ===
A number of bus routes serve Dundrum. Services operated by Dublin Bus include route 14 (to Beaumont), 44 (DCU to Enniskerry), 44B (to Glencullen), 74 (to Eden Quay), L25 (to Dún Laoghaire and S5 (to Chapelizod). Go-Ahead Ireland also operates route 161 (Rockbrook) and S6 (Blackrock to Tallaght). In addition, private operator Dublin Coach serves Dublin Airport via the Red Cow interchange, operating every 60 minutes.

== People ==
The 19th-century Irish physicist George Johnstone Stoney, the first person to posit the existence of the electron, resided in Dundrum for much of his adult life. Dundrum was also the home of Séamus Brennan, former Minister of Social and Family Affairs, and is the family home of cyclist Stephen Roche. The operatic singers Charles Manners and Fanny Moody retired here and died here. Dundrum was also the childhood home for Radio One DJ Annie Mac. RTÉ host Derek Mooney lives in Holy Well. Oscar-winner Brenda Fricker grew up here. Many of Eavan Boland's poems depict the urban landscape of the area. Former Green Party leader Eamon Ryan was born in Dundrum. The Christian Scientist Violet Spiller Hay (1873–1969) was born here. Choreographer Liz Roche is also from Dundrum.

== Sport ==
Tour de France Winner, cyclist Stephen Roche is from Dundrum, as is his son Nicolas Roche (although Nicolas was actually born in France).

Dundrum is home to athletics club Dundrum Athletic, and football side Dundrum Athletic F.C.

The local GAA club is Naomh Olaf

== See also ==
- List of towns and villages in the Republic of Ireland
- The Parish of Taney in Dundrum
- The Church of St. Nahi
