= Kill, Rathdown =

Parish in County Dublin, Ireland

Kill (Irish: An Chill) is a civil parish in the barony of Rathdown. It is located in the county of Dún Laoghaire–Rathdown, Ireland. It is named after Kill of the Grange, a townland itself named after a church now in ruins. Other townlands in the parish are Ballinclea, Cabinteely, Cornelscourt, Deansgrange, Foxrock, Galloping Green South and North, Johnstown, Mulchanstown, Newpark, Newtownpark, Rocheshill, Rochestown Domain, Scalpwilliam or Mount Mapas, Thomastown, Tipperstown, and Woodpark.

The east of the parish borders the Irish Sea at Scalpwilliam or Mount Mapas. Neighbouring parishes are Dalkey to the east, Monkstown to the north, Stillorgan to the northwest, Kilmacud to the west, Tully to the south, and Killiney to the southeast.
