= Foxrock–Cabinteely GAA =

Ladies' Gaelic football club

- Carraig an tSionnaigh Cábán tSíle
- Founded: 2005
- County: Dublin
- Nickname: Fox-Cab
- Colours: Blue and Green
- Grounds: Kilbogget Park
- Coordinates: 53.259770, -6.139039

Playing kits
Standard colours

Senior Club Championships
	All Ireland	Leinster champions	Dublin champions
Ladies' football:	0	6	8

Foxrock–Cabinteely GAA is a Gaelic Athletic Association club based in the Foxrock, Cabinteely, Johnstown and Cornelscourt areas of Dún Laoghaire–Rathdown. The club was founded in 2005, following the merger of Foxrock Girls Gaelic Club and Cabinteely GAA. The club specialises in ladies' Gaelic football. During the 2010s Foxrock–Cabinteely have won both the Dublin Ladies' Senior Football Championship and the Leinster Ladies' Senior Club Football Championship. They have also played in All-Ireland Ladies' Club Football Championship finals.

== History ==
In 2005 Cabinteely GAA Ladies' merged with Foxrock Girls Gaelic Club to become Foxrock–Cabinteely GAA. The founding members of the club, including Pat Ring and Philip McAnenly, decided that the new club should specialise in ladies' Gaelic football. They also established partnerships with local national schools, including St. Patrick's and Hollypark in Foxrock, St. Brigid's in Cabinteely, Our Lady of Good Counsel in Johnstown and St. Anne's in Shankill. This saw Pat Ring coaching in the schools and actively recruiting players for the club.

In 2005 Foxrock–Cabinteely formed their first adult team in conjunction with Naomh Ólaf. In 2007 they won their first adult title when they won the Dublin Junior A Championship. In the same year they also won an All-Ireland junior title. In 2008 they gained intermediate status and by 2009 they had obtained senior status. In 2012 they won the Dublin Ladies' Senior Football Championship for the first time. As of 2020, the club had over 500 playing members.

== Senior finals ==
=== All-Ireland ===
In 2016 Foxrock–Cabinteely played in their first All-Ireland final but lost to Donaghmoyne. In 2018 they made a second appearance in the All-Ireland final but once again finished as runners-up, losing out to Mourneabbey.

Season	Winner	Score	Runners up	Venue
2018	Mourneabbey	1–13; 1–07	Foxrock–Cabinteely	Parnell Park
2016	Donaghmoyne (Monaghan)	2–09; 0–08	Foxrock–Cabinteely	Parnell Park

=== Leinster ===
Season	Winner	Score	Runners up	Venue
2021	Dunboyne (Meath)	2–11; 2–08	Foxrock–Cabinteely	Kinnegad
2020	Foxrock–Cabinteely	1–12; 2–04	Portlaoise (Laois)	Kinnegad
2019	Foxrock–Cabinteely	4–06; 1–07	Sarsfields (Laois)	Kinnegad
2018	Foxrock–Cabinteely	4–11; 1–08	Sarsfields (Laois)	Kinnegad
2017	Foxrock–Cabinteely	4–17; 1–07	Confey	Kinnegad
2016	Foxrock–Cabinteely	5–10; 1–03	St Laurence's	Kinnegad
2015	Foxrock–Cabinteely	1–12; 1–07	Sarsfields (Laois)	Clane
2012	Shelmaliers	3–02; 0–10	Foxrock–Cabinteely	Aughrim

=== Dublin ===
Season	Winner	Score	Runners up	Venue
2021	Foxrock-Cabinteely	1-07; 0-07	Na Fianna	Lawless Memorial Park
2020	Foxrock-Cabinteely	3–07; 2–08	Kilmacud Crokes	Swords
2019	Foxrock–Cabinteely	2–13; 3–08 (Note: After extra time.)	Kilmacud Crokes	Parnell Park
2018	Foxrock–Cabinteely	1–13; 0–07	St Brigid's	St Margaret's
2017	Foxrock–Cabinteely	1–10; 1–05	Ballyboden St. Enda's	Swords
2016	Foxrock–Cabinteely	1–13; 2–09	St Brigid's	Parnell Park
2015	Foxrock–Cabinteely	3–10; 2–01	St Brigid's	
2014	Na Fianna	1–11; 1–09	Foxrock–Cabinteely	Swords
2012	Foxrock–Cabinteely	0–12; 0–09	Na Fianna	Parnell Park

== Notable players ==
=== Senior inter-county ladies' footballers ===
Dublin

- Niamh Collins
- Amy Connolly
- Sinéad Goldrick
- Emma McDonagh
- Amy Ring
- Hannah O'Neill
- Tarah O'Sullivan
- Jodi Egan
- Faye O'Connell-Bell

Laois

- Laura Nerney

Louth

- Anne-Marie Murphy
- Sarah Quinn

Meath

- Aedin Murray

Westmeath

- Fiona Claffey

Wicklow

- Lorna Fusciardi
- Laurie Ahern

== Honours ==
- All-Ireland Ladies' Club Football Championship
  - Runner up: 2016, 2018: 2
- Leinster Ladies' Senior Club Football Championship
  - Winners: 2015, 2016, 2017, 2018, 2019, 2020: 6
  - Runner up: 2012, 2021: 2
- Dublin Ladies' Senior Football Championship
  - Winners: 2012, 2015, 2016, 2017, 2018, 2019, 2020, 2021: 8
  - Runner up: 2014: 1
