= Cabinteely =

Suburb of Dublin, Ireland

Cabinteely Cábán tSíle (Irish)
- Suburb
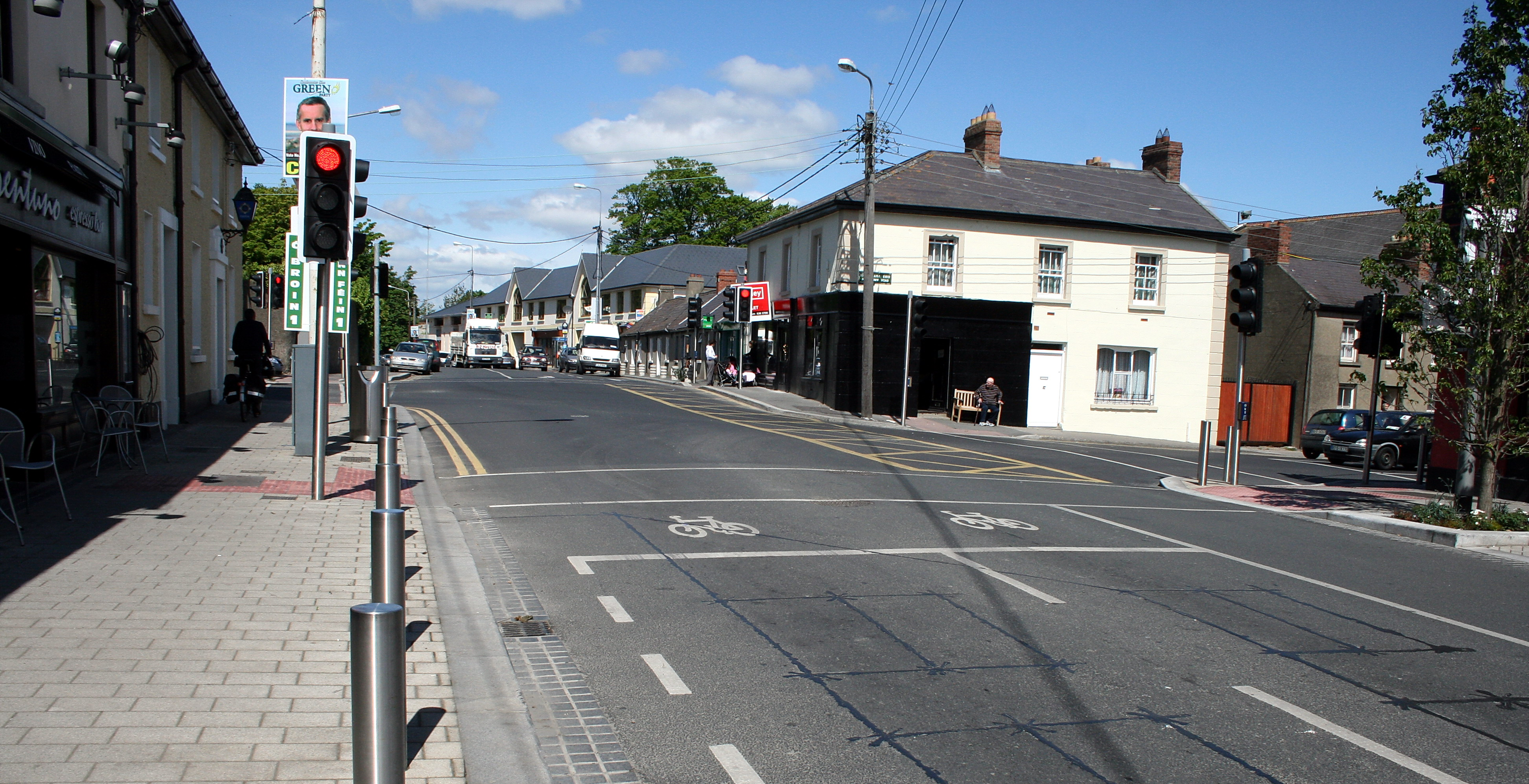
- Cabinteely crossroads

- Location in Ireland
- Coordinates: 53.261°N 6.151°W
- Country: Ireland
- Province: Leinster
- County: County Dublin
- Local government area: Dún Laoghaire–Rathdown
- Elevation: 88 m (289 ft)

Population (2022)
  - Electoral division: 15,864
- Eircode routing key: D18
- Area code: 01 (+3531)
- Irish Grid Reference: O236249

Cabinteely (Irish: Cábán tSíle, meaning 'Sheila's cabin') is a suburb of Dublin's southside. It is in Dún Laoghaire–Rathdown, County Dublin, Ireland. The population of all electoral divisions labelled as Cabinteely was 15,864 as of the 2022 census.

== Geography ==
Cabinteely lies around the crossroads of Johnstown Road / Brennanstown Road and the Old Bray Road, and on either side of the Stillorgan Dual Carriageway (N11), which is parallel to the Old Bray Road. The R827 road runs from Blackrock and terminates in Cabinteely.

Much of Cabinteely is parkland (Cabinteely Park and Kilbogget Park) or open countryside (around Laughanstown and Brennanstown).

Cabinteely borders Ballybrack, Carrickmines, Cherrywood, Cornelscourt, Deansgrange, Foxrock, Johnstown, Killiney and Loughlinstown.

== History and monuments ==
The area has seen human activity since prehistoric times - there is a tomb known as Brennanstown Portal Tomb, Glendruid cromlech/dolmen, or The Druids' Altar near Cabinteely.

Excavations between 1957 and 1999 some 700m southeast of Cabinteely suggest that the area was of "considerable status and importance" from the 6th-7th centuries, with possible evidence of a church, ancillary buildings, possible workshops and a cemetery.

Anecdotal evidence suggests that Cabinteely grew up around a tavern (Irish: Cabán tSíle, meaning 'Sheila's Cabin') located at a crossroads on the main road linking Dublin with the South.

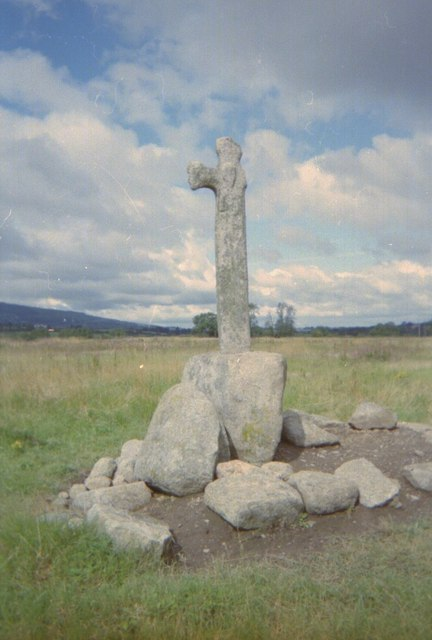
Tully Celtic cross

Cabinteely sits at the meeting point of the three medieval civil parishes of Tully, Kill and Killiney, in the half-barony of Rathdown. The ruins of Kill Abbey/Grange Church are near Deansgrange. The modern suburb of Cabinteely is still split between these civil parishes.

The ruined 9th century Tully Church and graveyard lies within the modern parish of Cabinteely at Laughanstown. Two high crosses from the 12th century stand in nearby fields, and a wedge tomb, all protected as National Monuments (#216). It is likely the modern Church of Ireland parish of Tullow, with a church nearby in Foxrock, is related to that civil parish of Tully. Similarly, the modern Church of Ireland parish of Kill has a church in Deansgrange.

Cabinteely House was built in 1769 for Robert Nugent, Lord Clare, and the surrounding demesne wall still mostly exists today (running along the Old Bray Road, Brennanstown Road, and Cornelscourt Hill). It later passed into the possession of the O'Byrne family of Wicklow, who were prominent in Cabinteely since the 1660s (the family originally lived in Marlfield House). William Richard O'Byrne (1823–1896), MP and author of the Naval Biographical Dictionary, owned and lived in Cabinteely House. Joseph McGrath purchased the house in 1933. Cabinteely House finally passed into the possession of Dún Laoghaire–Rathdown County Council in 1984.

Cabinteely was described in the 1837 book, A Topographical Dictionary of Ireland, as having "several handsome seats [houses]...adorned with thriving plantations and presents many natural beauties".

The Ordnance Survey Ireland map 1837-1842 shows Cabinteely village with "Post Office, R.C. Church, and Police Barrack". The townland of Cabinteely at that time only included Cabinteely Demesne and Marlfield House (today in the St. Gabriels estate), whereas the modern suburb now includes neighbouring townlands such as Rochestown, Kilbogget, Brennanstown, and Laughanstown.

The Ordnance Survey Ireland map 1888-1913 shows Cabinteely Village with "P.O., Presbytery, St.Brigid's R.C. Church, Smithy, Constab. Bk., Court Ho., Dispy." among others, and Dublin Corporation's water main running directly through the Village.

Cabinteely Barracks was attacked numerous times during the civil war.

Land rezoning in Cabinteely during the 1990s was the subject of an investigation under the Mahon Tribunal.

== Political divisions ==
The four electoral divisions of Cabinteely-Granitefield, Cabinteely-Kilbogget, Cabinteely-Loughlinstown and Cabinteely-Pottery are in the Dáil constituency of Dún Laoghaire. They are divided between the local electoral areas of Dún Laoghaire and Killiney–Shankill for elections to Dún Laoghaire–Rathdown County Council. Cabinteely is split between the postal districts of Dublin 18 and County Dublin.

== Transport ==
Cabinteely lies just off the N11. It is also accessible from Dún Laoghaire and the M50, via junction 15 Carrickmines.

A number of bus routes operated by Dublin Bus as well as Go-Ahead Ireland serve Cabinteely such as the L26 and E1. The Aircoach 702 route also stops at Cabinteely Cross on its route from Greystones to Dublin Airport. Finnegan's operate a bus service from Bray DART station to the Luas stop in Sandyford, via Cabinteely.

The Luas Green Line passes close to Cabinteely with a stop at Laughanstown, about 20 minutes walk from Cabinteely; there is also an unused stop at Brennanstown that has yet to open and a stop at Carrickmines (about 30 minutes walk to Cabinteely), with a journey time of less than 40 minutes to Dublin City Centre.

== Amenities ==
Cabinteely has several shops, including a boutique and estate agency, and several restaurants and cafés, as well as hairdressers, barbers and dental surgery. Cornelscourt shopping centre and "The Park" shopping centre also serve the area. The "Horse and Hound" public house is in the centre of the village.

Cabinteely's Carnegie library was opened in 1912, and features a tiled roof, copper cupola and leaded windows.

Cabinteely Park spans 45 hectares and includes a children's playground. It is a good place to look for rare birds such as the great spotted woodpecker. Kilbogget Park hosts rugby, soccer, Gaelic clubs and pitches, as well as a recreational area with floodlit car parking & paths.

Cabinteely House and its outbuildings are owned by Dún Laoghaire–Rathdown County Council and while not open day-to-day, are often open for cultural events and historical tours. Kilbogget House, a large mostly Georgian house in Shrewsbury Wood, was open part of the year for tours, but this has ceased.

The St. John Ambulance Brigade of Ireland has a division based in Cabinteely.

== Education ==
There are a number of primary and secondary schools serving the area, such as St.Brigid's Girls National School, St. Brigid's Boys National School (Foxrock), Cabinteely Community School, Clonkeen College and Loreto Convent.

== Religion ==
St. Brigid's Roman Catholic Church is in the Archdiocese of Dublin and was opened on 10 October 1836. The church is dedicated to St. Brigid, who has a long association with the area.

In the Church of Ireland, the area is divided between the parishes of Tullow, with a church nearby in Foxrock, and that of Kill, with a church in Deansgrange.

== Sport ==
The local Gaelic Athletic Association clubs are Cabinteely GAA and Foxrock–Cabinteely who play in Kilbogget Park. Geraldines P. Morans is another local GAA club which has its home pitches nearby at Cornelscourt.

The local soccer teams, Cabinteely F.C. and Park Celtic F.C., are based in Kilbogget Park and Cabinteely Park respectively.

There are two rugby clubs: St. Brigid's Rugby Club, and Seapoint RFC. The latter is a senior All Ireland League club based in Kilbogget Park.

== Notable people ==
- Hilary Boyle, journalist and activist
- Colm Brophy, politician
- Rosanna Davison, winner of the Miss World title in 2003 and daughter of singer Chris de Burgh, lives in Cabinteely.
- John Fitzgerald, footballer, is from Cabinteely.
- Amy Huberman, actress, writer and wife of Brian O'Driscoll, grew up in Cabinteely.
- William Kenny, politician, judge and Liberal Unionist politician, lived in Marlfield House.
- George Lee, economist, journalist, television and radio presenter, and former Fine Gael politician, lives in Cabinteely.
- Michael Lyster, radio and television broadcaster
- Diarmuid Martin, former Roman Catholic Archbishop of Dublin and Primate of Ireland, was curate of Cabinteely Parish in 1973–74.
- Joseph McGrath, politician and founder of the Irish Hospitals' Sweepstake, owned and lived in Cabinteely House.
- Chloe Mustaki, footballer
- Eoin Ó Broin, political theorist and politician, is from Cabinteely.
- Mary Mitchell O'Connor, former TD for Dún Laoghaire, lives in Cabinteely.
- Glenn Quinn, actor, grew up in Cabinteely.
- Kevin Shields, musician and frontman of My Bloody Valentine, was raised in Cabinteely.
- Colin Stafford-Johnson, cameraman and television presenter
