= Miss Universe Ireland 2011 =

- Date: 16 June 2011
- Venue: Abbey Theatre, Dublin, Ireland
- Entrants: 28
- Winner: Aoife Hannon; Kerry
- Congeniality: Kirsten Haugh; North Dublin
- Photogenic: Natasha Shafai; Belfast

Miss Universe Ireland 2011 was held on 16 June 2011 in the Abbey Theatre in Dublin. There was county pageants from 29 January to 23 May. The winner represented Ireland at Miss Universe 2011.

== Results ==
Final results	Contestant
Miss Universe Ireland 2011	Kerry - Aoife Hannon
1st Runner-up	Galway - Aoifa Lenon
2nd Runner-up	Louth - Tara O' Farrell
3rd Runner-up	Dublin - Lydia Bowers
4th Runner-up	Cork - Anita O'Brien
5th Runner-up	Tipperary - Faye Rooney
Semi-Finalist	Clare - Alanagh Hunt; Dún Laoghaire–Rathdown - Kate Slattery; North Dublin - Kirsten Haugh; Tipperary - Aisling Bourke; Tyrone - Etaoin ni hAilpin; Wicklow - Lesley Taylor

=== Special awards ===
- Miss Photogenic - Natasha Shafai (Belfast)
- Miss Congeniality - Kirsten Haugh (North Dublin)
- Miss Fashion - Lydia Bowers (Dublin)
- Miss Internet - Aoifa Lenon (Galway)

== Contestants ==
County	Contestant	Age	Height	Hometown
Antrim	Lisa Nolan	23	1.78 m (5 ft 10 in)	Antrim
Belfast	Natasha Shafai	19	1.74 m (5 ft 8 1/2 in)	Belfast
Clare	Ester Woods	23	1.75 m (5 ft 9 in)	Ennis
Cork	Anita O'Brien	18	1.79 m (5 ft 10 1/2 in)	Cork
Donegal	Lyndsey Kelly	20	1.77 m (5 ft 9 1/2 in)	Galway
Dublin	Lydia Bowers	22	1.79 m (5 ft 10 1/2 in)	Dublin
Dún Laoghaire–Rathdown	Kate Slattery	20	1.75 m (5 ft 9 in)	Cork
Fermanagh	Eliza Monroe	18	1.70 m (5 ft 7 in)	Cork
Fingal	Kelly Donegan	24	1.71 m (5 ft 7 1/2 in)	Dublin
Galway	Aoifa Lenon	20	1.80 m (5 ft 11 in)	Galway
Kerry	Aoife Hannon	19	1.81 m (5 ft 11 1/2 in)	Listowel
Kildare	Hannah Devane	23	1.74 m (5 ft 8 1/2 in)	Naas
Kilkenny	Kate McDaid	18	1.71 m (5 ft 7 1/2 in)	Galway
Limerick	Kellie McGrath	21	1.70 m (5 ft 7 in)	Limerick
Louth	Tara O' Farrell	22	1.81 m (5 ft 11 1/2 in)	Dublin
Mayo	Sarah Kelly	25	1.83 m (6 ft 0 in)	Castlebar
Meath	Lorraine O'Reilly	27	1.79 m (5 ft 10 1/2 in)	Naas
National Capital	Melissa Walsh	24	1.77 m (5 ft 9 1/2 in)	Dublin
North Dublin	Kirsten Haugh	21	1.76 m (5 ft 9 1/2 in)	Dublin
Tipperary	Faye Rooney	20	1.79 m (5 ft 10 1/2 in)	Dublin
Offaly	Jade Lynch	25	1.75 m (5 ft 9 in)	Naas
Roscommon	Carrie McGowan	20	1.74 m (5 ft 8 1/2 in)	Athlone
Sligo	Natasha Carty	24	1.73 m (5 ft 8 in)	Sligo
South Dublin	Lauren Forutyin	20	1.85 m (6 ft 1 in)	Dublin
Tipperary	Aisling Bourke	20	1.82 m (5 ft 11 1/2 in)	Dublin
Tipperary	Aren McDonald	24	1.72 m (5 ft 7 1/2 in)	Cashel
Tyrone	Etaoin ni hAilpin	23	1.75 m (5 ft 9 in)	Galway
Wicklow	Lesley Taylor	19	1.77 m (5 ft 9 1/2 in)	Wicklow
