= Institute of Education (Dublin) =

Irish private senior school founded 1969

The Institute of Education
- Institiúid Oideachais
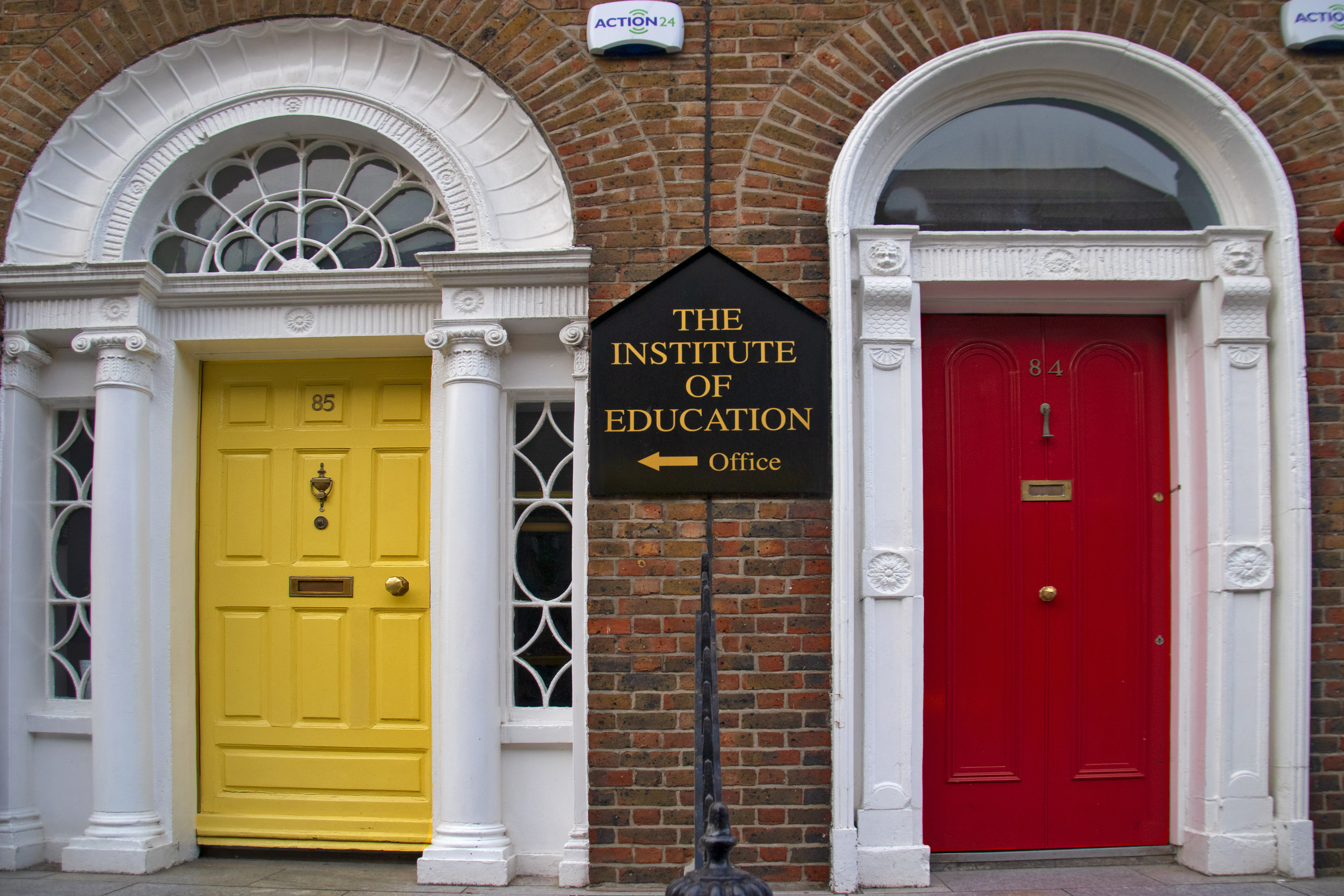
- The Institute of Education

Location
- Dublin; Ireland; 53°20′06.08″N 6°15′20.41″W

Information
- Type: Independent day school
- Religious affiliation: Non-denominational
- Established: 1969
- President: Raymond Kearns
- Principal: Yvonne O'Toole
- Grades: 4th, 5th, 6th years
- Enrollment: ~1,000
- Language: English
- Campus: Urban
Colour
- Nickname: The Institute
- Tuition: €11000
- Website: www.instituteofeducation.ie

The Institute of Education (IOE), is one of the largest private secondary schools in Ireland, teaching 4th, 5th and 6th year pupils. As well as preparing for the Leaving Certificate, fourth-year pupils at the Institute have the option to study a selection of subjects from the Cambridge International GCSE programme (IGCSE) as well as CEFR Language exams.

== Academic offering ==
The Institute provides several programmes, all within the Senior Cycle of the Irish educational system. Those who wish to study full-time are known as day students and pay standard yearly fees. Students may also attend the school's part-time and evening "grind" classes, which take place in the evenings and Saturday mornings, with intensive tuition and fees based on the number of subjects taken. Intensive five-day revision courses are also available during regular school holidays, such as Christmas, Easter, winter mid-term break, and May and August. Study skills seminars are available in September. The Institute also runs preparation courses for the Health Professions Admissions Test (HPAT).

The Institute of Education is an official exam centre for Irish Leaving Certificate and BioMedical Admissions Test.

== Ownership ==
Unlike other secondary schools in the country, the Institute receives no government funding and is therefore not subject to the school rules and regulations put in place by the Department of Education.

The Institute of Education is privately owned and was historically associated with the Kearns family. In April 2023, the school was acquired by Dukes Education, a UK-based international education group. The transaction, valued at approximately €130 million, encompassed the Institute's properties on Leeson Street, appraised at €30 million, and £8.6 million in cash. The educational business itself was valued at over €91 million.

Post-acquisition, the school's principal, Yvonne O'Toole, remained in her role and took on the managing director position. Peter Kearns, son of the founder Ray Kearns, stepped down as managing director but continued in a strategic advisory capacity. The Kearns family retained a 6.7% stake in the business.

== Buildings and facilities ==
The school is located in several refurbished Georgian terraced houses on Leeson Street in Dublin. It also has three newer buildings at the back of the terraced houses. The Institute of Education has a science laboratory, art room, home economics kitchen, computer laboratory, and a specialised technical drawing classroom. There are two halls for supervised study. All classes are recorded and livestreamed on Panopto for students to access. Teachers also use the Moodle system to communicate with students and post online learning resources.

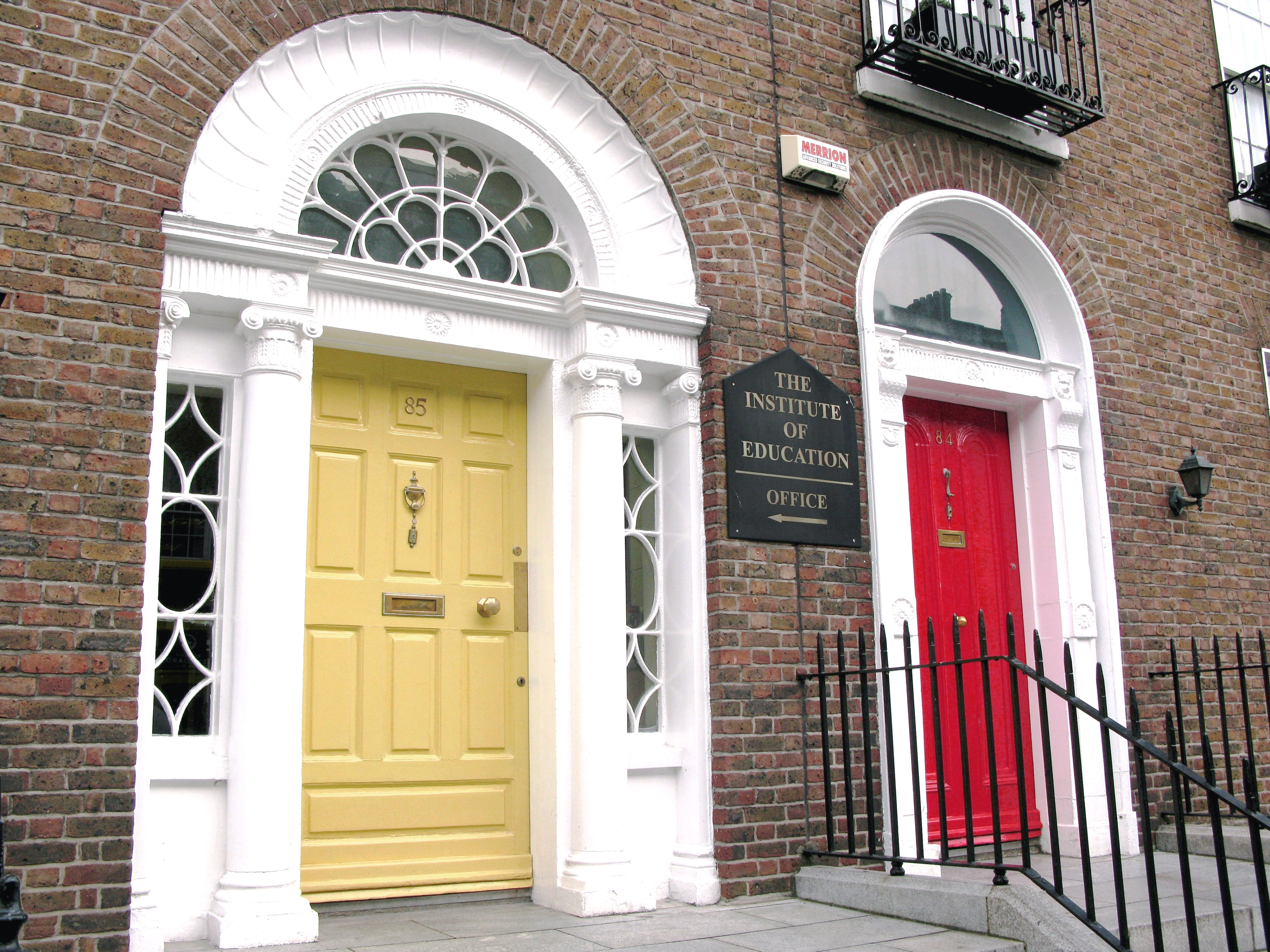
The yellow door of Number 85 Lower Leeson Street

== Awards and achievements ==
Students from the school have received recognition in national and international competitions, such as academic scholarships. In 2023, for example, 83 students were awarded UCD Entrance Scholarships and in 2020, 9 Leaving Certificate cohort students received Academic Scholarship Awards from Dublin City University. In 2024, a student from the Institute was awarded the Eli Lilly prize for the best overall project in Chemistry or Biotechnology, and a student received an Excellence Award for an outstanding assignment on cystic fibrosis during the Oxford University Summer Course. Other awards have been won in areas such as business, musical performance and student journalism. Sports awards have also been acquired.

== Media ==
Between 2008 and 2012, the Institute of Education contributed to Exam Brief by the Irish Independent, a yearly six-part supplement dedicated to preparation for Leaving and Junior Certificate exams.

== Extracurricular activities ==
Extracurricular activities include "Culture Day", an annual event celebrating the diverse backgrounds of the student body through music, dance, and cuisine. There are also a number of student societies. These include debate, drama, choir, fitness, chess, language and sports clubs.

== Notable alumni ==
- Stephen Byrne – broadcaster with RTÉ
- Katy French – model, writer, television personality and charity worker
- Jedward – entertainers
- Evanna Lynch – actress
- Adam Murphy – footballer
- Paul Murphy – Teachta Dála for Solidarity
