= Rathdown (County Dublin barony) =

Rathdown Ráth an Dúin (Irish)
- Barony
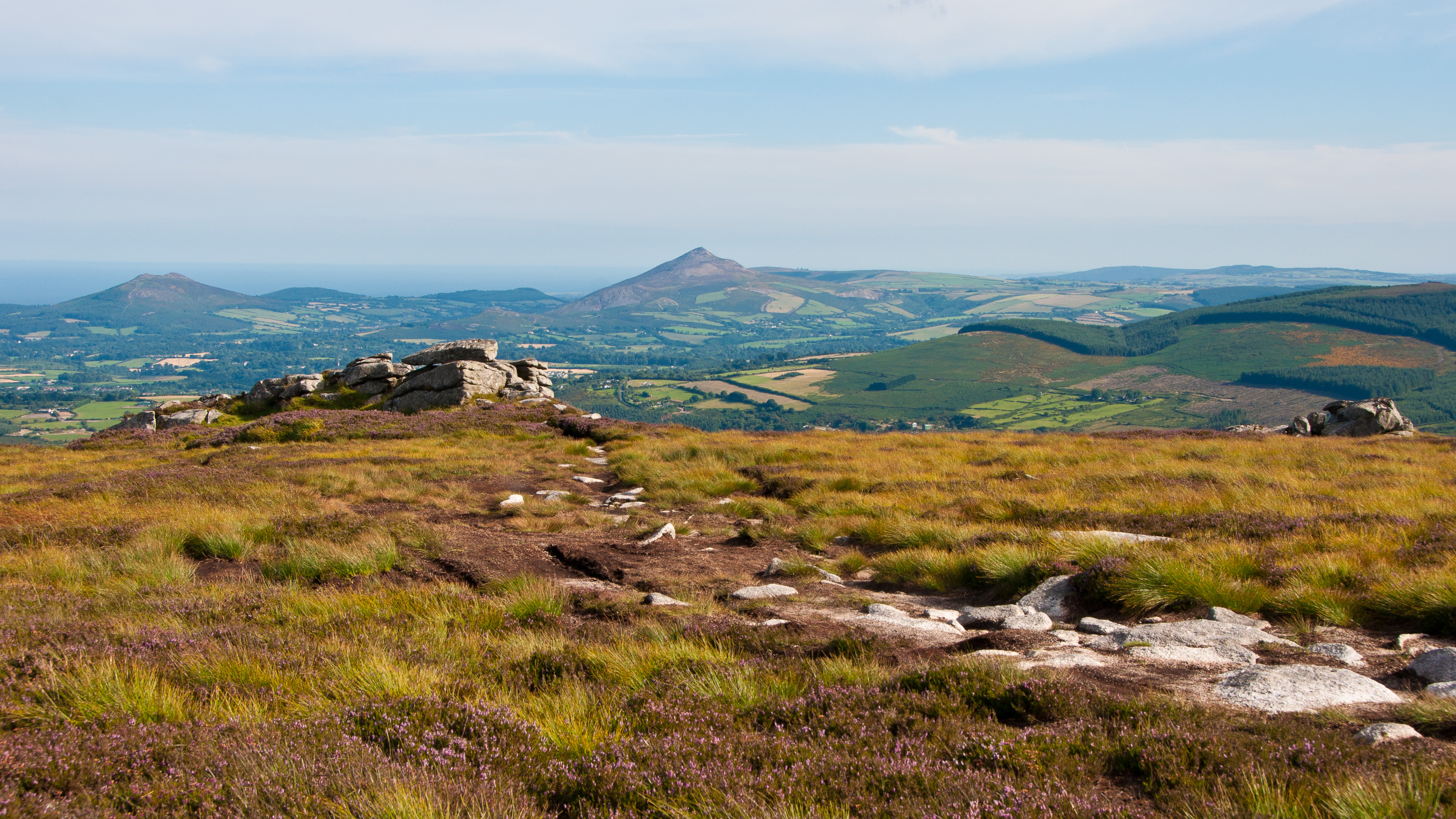
- Two Rock mountain

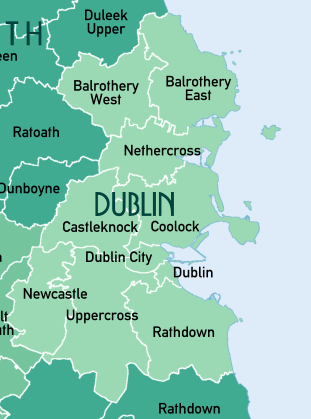
- Baronies of County Dublin. Rathdown is in the southeast.
- Sovereign state: Ireland
- County: Dublin

Area
  - Total: 121.3 km^{2} (46.8 sq mi)

Rathdown (Irish: Ráth an Dúin) is the south-easternmost barony in County Dublin, Ireland. It gives its name to the county of Dún Laoghaire–Rathdown. Before County Wicklow was shired in 1606, Rathdown extended further south: it was named after a medieval settlement which grew up around Rathdown Castle, at a site subsequently deserted and now in County Wicklow in the townland of Rathdown Upper, north of Greystones. The Wicklow barony of Rathdown corresponds to the portion transferred to the new county; although both divisions were originally classed as "half baronies", in the nineteenth century the distinction between a barony and a half barony was obsolete.

== Subdivisions ==
After the Poor Relief (Ireland) Act 1838, the poor law union of Rathdown covered a similar area to the Dublin and Wicklow baronies combined; after the Local Government (Ireland) Act 1898, the Dublin portion of the poor law union comprised the rural district of Rathdown No. 1 and the urban districts of Blackrock, Dalkey, Killiney and Ballybrack, and Kingstown (later renamed Dún Laoghaire). The barony of Rathdown also included part of the poor law union of Dublin South, comprising after 1898 parts of the rural district of Dublin South and the urban district of Rathmines and Rathgar.

Between 1836 and 1842, the boundaries of the County Dublin baronies were regularised, by which detached portions of baronies were transferred to the surrounding barony. Civil parishes wholly or partly within the barony are: Booterstown, Dalkey (transferred from Uppercross in 1842), Donnybrook, Kilgobbin, Kill, Killiney, Kilmacud, Kiltiernan, Monkstown, Oldconnaught, Rathfarnham (mostly transferred from Newcastle in 1842), Rathmichael (two townlands transferred from Newcastle in 1842), Stillorgan, Taney, Tully, Whitechurch.

Other settlements in the barony include Dundrum. "Little Bray", the part of the township of Bray north of the River Bray, was transferred from Rathdown, County Dublin to Rathdown, County Wicklow after the Local Government (Ireland) Act 1898.
