= Johnstown, Dublin =

Suburban area near Dun Laoghaire, Dublin, Ireland

Johnstown Baile Eoin (Irish)
- Suburb
- Location in Dublin Johnstown (Ireland)
- Coordinates: 53.26912°N 6.14517°W
- Country: Ireland
- Province: Leinster
- Local authority: Dún Laoghaire–Rathdown
- Time zone: UTC+0 (WET)
  - Summer (DST): UTC+1 (IST (WEST))
- Eircode routing key: A96
- Telephone area code: +353(0)1

Johnstown (Irish: Baile Eoin) is a small area in the south of Dublin, Ireland in the local government area of Dún Laoghaire–Rathdown. Once part of the grounds of Johnstown House, it is now primarily an estate of semi-detached houses and detached houses built during the 1960s by private developers and apartment blocks built in the last few years due to a heavy demand for housing.

The area of Johnstown is bordered by Cabinteely, Sallynoggin, Ballybrack and Killiney.

== Transport ==
Dublin Bus routes 7, 7B, 45A and 111 all stop on Rochestown Avenue and Churchview Road. Route numbers 84 and 145 stop at nearby Cabinteely village. Route number 59 stops at Mackintosh Park.

By road, Cabinteely village is accessible from the N11 national primary road. The R118 route also passes through Johnstown.

== Amenities and sport ==
Soccer, Gaelic games, and rugby are played in Kilbogget Park. There is also a playground in the park. The local GAA clubs are Cabinteely GAA and Foxrock–Cabinteely GAA. Cabinteely F.C., Seapoint RFC and Park Celtic FC are also in the area.

Cabinteely House and Park and Cabinteely Public Library are nearby.

== Education ==
Schools serving Johnstown include Our Lady of Good Counsel Boys National School and Girls National School, Cabinteely Community School and Clonkeen College.

== Religion ==
Johnstown is also the name of a parish of the Catholic Church. Its church was reroofed in 2005, and a new community centre has opened beside the church, which accommodates local groups.
