= Kill of the Grange =

Suburb (or part of one) of Dublin, within Dún Laoghaire–Rathdown, Ireland

- Kill o' the Grange, Clonkeen
- Cill na Gráinsí, Cluinchenn
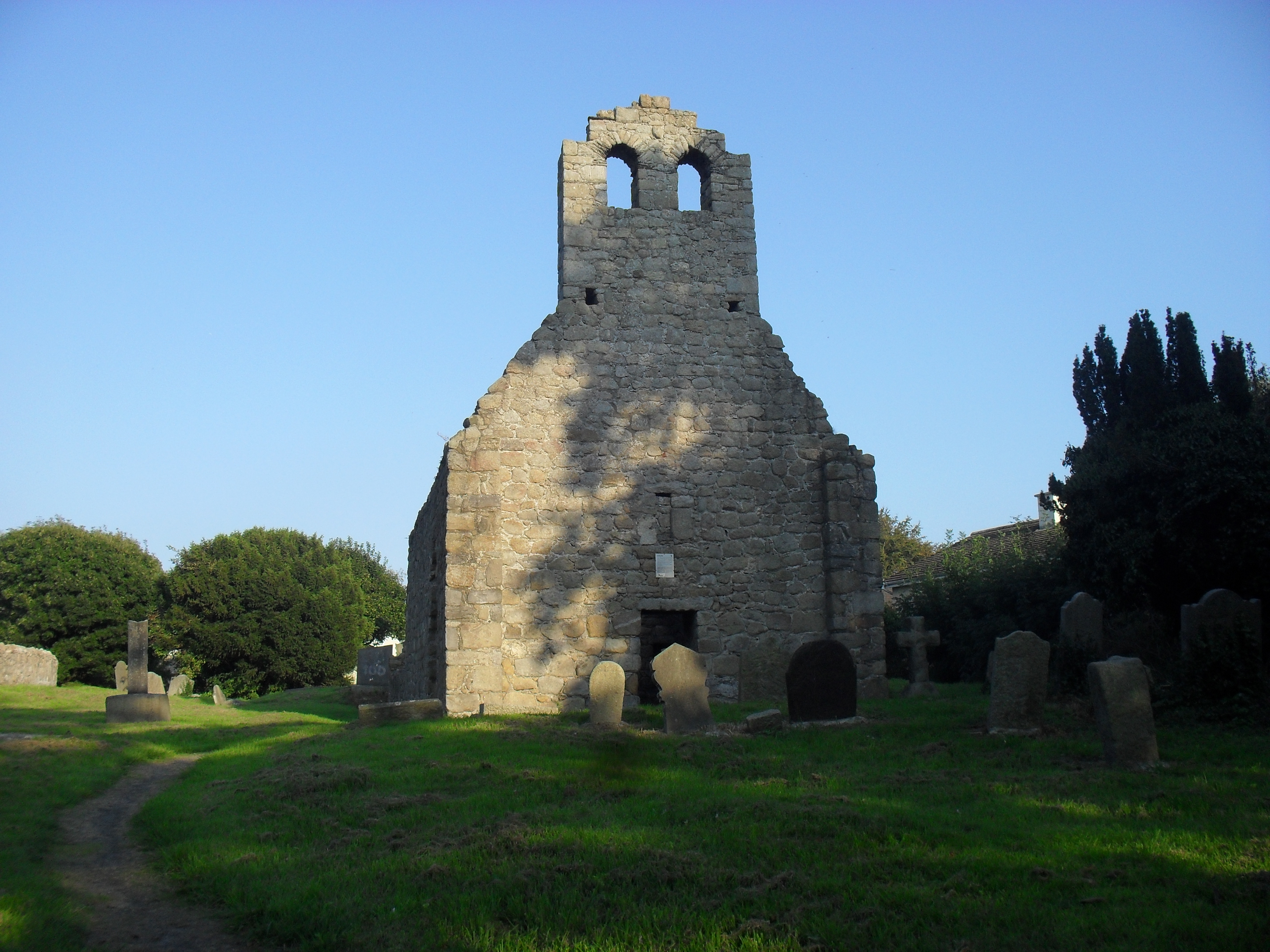

- Location within Dublin
- 53.281377°N 6.160982°W
- Location: Kill of the Grange / Deansgrange, County Dublin
- Country: Ireland
- Denomination: Pre-Reformation Catholic

History
- Founded: 11th century

Architecture
- Style: Norman
- Years built: 11th century
- Closed: 16th century

Specifications
- Length: 17 m (56 ft)
- Width: 7 m (23 ft)
- Materials: Stone

Administration
- Diocese: Dublin

National monument of Ireland
- Official name: Kill of the Grange
- Reference no.: 207 & 587

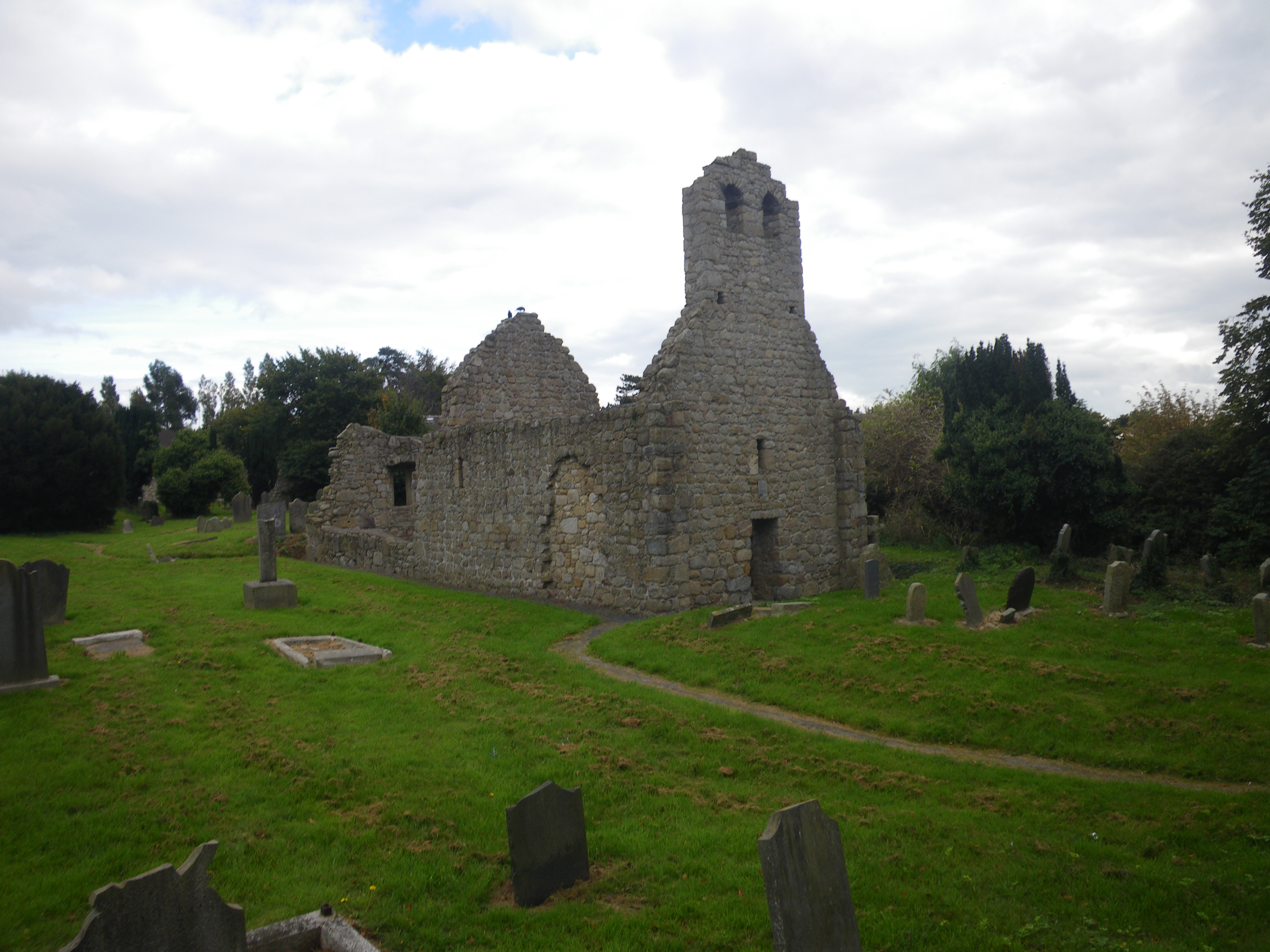
Exterior view

Kill of the Grange (Irish: Cill na Gráinsí), often Kill o' the Grange, is a suburban community and ancient parish in the half-barony of Rathdown, within the traditional County Dublin, in the jurisdiction of Dún Laoghaire–Rathdown. It contains an early religious site, which is a National Monument. The area, sometimes described as a twin of, and sometimes as part of, Deansgrange, is 5 miles southeast of Dublin.

== Location ==
Kill of the Grange lies 1.7 km (1.1 mi) inland, on the south side of Dublin Bay. In modern times it is mostly made up of housing developments, within one of which the historic church site lies. There is some retail presence, and the area is located beside or within Deansgrange, in the traditional County Dublin.

== Structures ==
=== Ancient church site ===
The early church is associated with St Finnian of Clonard and dates from the 11th century. Parts may date to the 6th century as they are similar to remains found at Glendalough. The church was originally a simple oblong (now the nave) and a chancel and belfry were later added. Originally known as Clonkeen (Irish: Cluinchenn), it is now known as Kill of the Grange, meaning "church of the monastic grange."

There is also a bullaun (about 25 cm (9.8 in) across) and holy well on the site.

=== Modern churches ===
There are two churches in use in the area in the 21st century. The Church of Ireland church is close to the traffic Lights. Designed in 1863 by William John Welland and John Gillespie who were architects to the Ecclesiastical Commissioners, the church was consecrated in 1864. It is on a rectangular plan with a double height apse.

The Roman Catholic church is located near Bakers Corner. From the 1970s, it is often described as 'The boiler house', and as "an exercise in the control of light from above."

=== Houses ===
The area is home to a number of historic houses, including Kill Abbey, which was originally built in 1595 by John Usher. The house is now much modified but still represents the oldest house in the Dún Laoghaire–Rathdown area.

== History ==
The site was part of the possessions of the Priory of the Holy Trinity (later Christ Church Cathedral, Dublin) and their records give a vivid picture of the 14th-century monastic site at Clonkeen / Kill o' the Grange, describing the construction of a kiln house with thatched roof and wattle and daub walls, and the grange itself being built from timber bought from the native Irish (probably in the Dublin Mountains).
