= Stephen Byrne (broadcaster) =

Irish vlogger and television personality

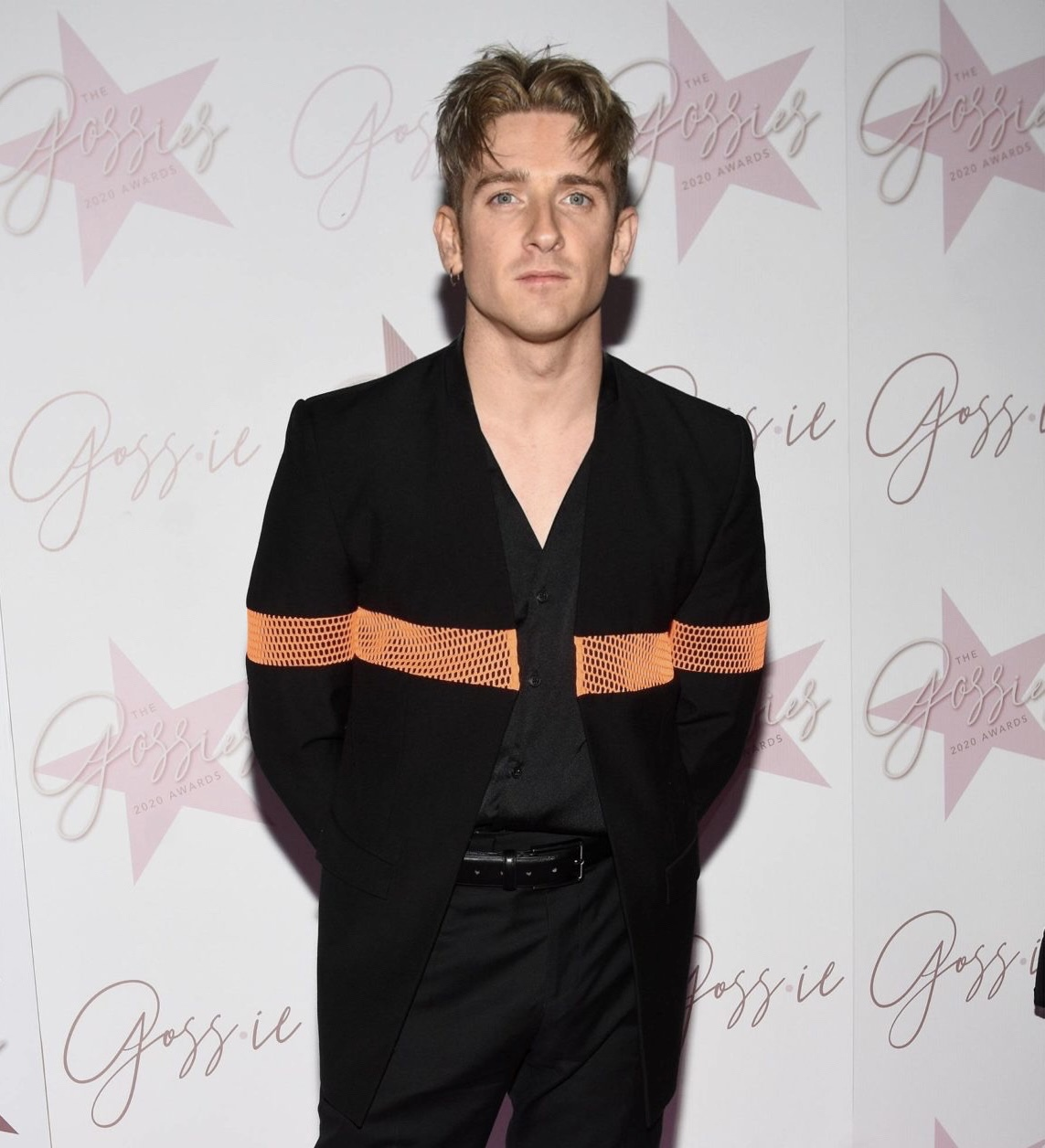
- Occupation: Media personality
- Employer: RTÉ
- Known for: RTÉ 2fm; Two Tube ApartmentRED and Juice on RTÉ Two; 3sixty5days on YouTube
- Website: www.twitter.com/3sixty5days

Stephen Byrne is an Irish Australian radio, television, and Internet personality. He began his career as a YouTuber before being discovered by RTÉ, going on to present a number of programmes for the network, including Two Tube for RTÉ Two (2010, 2012–2017) and Weekenders for RTÉ 2fm (2017–2022).

== Early life ==
He spent part of his childhood in Melbourne, Australia and holds dual Irish and Australian citizenship. He attended Clonkeen College and The Institute of Education. In his video What is my life?, Byrne and Jedward revealed that they attended school together.

== Television ==
Byrne started his television career in September 2008 when producers discovered his YouTube channel, 3sixty5days. He first worked on ApartmentRED, the national broadcaster's first cross-media show which broadcast both online and on RTÉ Two on Saturday mornings. In it, he played an exaggerated version of himself living in an apartment controlled by a Big Brother type character. He left the show after two years in July 2010.

In February 2010, Byrne became the main presenter of Two Tube on RTÉ Two. The show was live for 5 days a week, two hours a day, and discussed current sport, technology, entertainment, and music. In September 2010, Byrne joined the presenting team of TRTÉ's The Rumour Room. Throughout the show he interacted online, talking with the viewers on both Facebook and Twitter directly, allowing them to influence the direction of the show. The programme featured many music videos and sketches that Byrne both scripted and appeared in. In September 2011 he began presenting Juice, a thrice-weekly RTÉ entertainment show featuring celebrity interviews, online audience interaction and style spotting.

In March 2012 Byrne presented #HowToBeIrish for RTÉ One with RTÉ 2fm presenter Rick O'Shea and International IMG model Faye Dinsmore. It was a documentary made entirely from video clips sent in by Irish people worldwide declaring what Irishness means to them. Byrne also shared a story with the audience about his great-grandfather's involvement in the Irish Civil War. It aired at 7.30pm on Saint Patrick's Day and was the first RTÉ programme to be made entirely of user-generated content, as well as the first to be broadcast simultaneously online in a joint venture with YouTube. The show created an enormous amount of buzz with the hashtag #HowToBeIrish trending for 24 hours on Twitter.

In October 2012, Byrne rejoined a newly branded Two Tube; the series finished on television in 2016, but continued online into early 2017 before being axed fully. In January 2013, he joined the presenting team of The Voice of Ireland as its new backstage V-Reporter for the second season of the show. From 2013 to 2018, he hosted RTÉ coverage of the Oscar Red Carpet and interview room live from LA. In November 2016 RTÉ aired Playing Straight, a documentary fronted by Byrne exploring the topic of homophobia in football and why Premier League stars still do not come out. In it, he spoke with Amal Fashanu, niece of the late Justin Fashanu.

In his 2018 Leaving Again documentary for RTÉ, Byrne undertook the Leaving Certificate again to show the pressure and stress students are put under through the education system and its potential impact on mental health.

== Radio ==
Stephen previously presented a show titled Weekenders on RTÉ 2FM every Saturday and Sunday from 1-4pm and then from 3-5pm. His show replaced Weekenders with Ruth Scott. Byrne left RTÉ 2fm at the end of March 2022.

== Online ==
=== 3sixty5days ===
Byrne began making comedy videos under the name 3sixty5days in August 2007 when he was 17 years old. In total, his videos have got over 5.4 million views. In February 2009 YouTube featured his video "Because of YouTube" on the front page of the website. To date, it has over 670,000 views. The video got over 600 video responses. Stephen has spoken both across Ireland and internationally about the effect of online community in modern media. Byrne also parodied Lady Gaga's "Bad Romance", calling his own version "Banana Hands". The song received both national and international radio airplay on RTÉ 2FM and BBC Radio 1.

=== ApartmentRED ===
After a year producing his own content online, he was recruited by RTÉ in 2008 to star in their first cross-media show Apartment Red or ApartmentRED alongside the likes of Dermot Ward. Red was among the first attempts by a mainstream media outlet to "target Internet audiences". The show was watched over 4.9 million times and received many awards across Europe including the Prix Circum for cross-media programming in 2009. In 2009 the show released a three-minute recording of Byrne coughing over samba music into the Irish charts in aid of Reach Out, an online based charity dealing with the awareness of mental health for teenagers. The song charted at No. 1 on the Irish Alternative Charts.

== Awards ==
In March 2009, Byrne was voted the RTÉ Guide's Sexiest Male TV Star. Jonathan Rhys Meyers, star of The Tudors, came in second place. Byrne was also nominated for TV Newcomer of the Year 2010 in the TV Now Awards held in Dublin's Mansion House.

In May 2011 he was awarded a Bord Gáis Energy Social Media Award for 'Most Innovative Use of Social Media' for his influence in The Rumour Room's use of audience interaction via social media.

In May 2013, he was announced as one of 16 international winners of YouTube and Google's 'Next Up' competition.
