= Cabinteely GAA =

Gaelic games club in Dublin, Ireland

- CLG Chábán tSíle
- Founded: 1977
- County: Dublin
- Nickname: Cabo
- Colours: Blue and White
- Grounds: Kilbogget Park, Cabinteely and Ticknick Park, Cherrywood
- Coordinates: 53.259770, -6.139039

Playing kits
Standard colours

Senior Club Championships
| | All Ireland | Leinster champions | Dublin champions |
|---|---|---|---|
| Football: | 0 | 0 | 0 |
| Hurling: | 0 | 0 | 0 |
| Camogie: | 0 | 0 | 0 |

Cabinteely (Irish: CLG Chábán tSíle) is a Dublin GAA And Dublin Camogie club based in Kilbogget Park which serves the Cabinteely / Johnstown / Killiney / Cherrywood / Ballybrack / Loughlinstown areas of Dublin, Ireland.

== History ==
Cabinteely GAA Club was founded in 1977 and shortly thereafter acquired home grounds at the newly developed Kilbogget Park, Cabinteely. The clubhouse at Kilbogget Park was opened in 1994 by which stage the club fielded juvenile teams, 2 adult football teams as well as an adult hurling team - Kerry GAA legends Eoin 'Bomber' Liston and Ogie Moran guested for the club in the exhibition game held on the day to honour the occasion.

In the late 1990s, the club fielded its first girls' football teams and this would later lead to the formation of Foxrock Cabinteely GAA.

Cabinteely won two Dublin Junior Hurling Championships in the 1990s, in 1995 and in 1997. Both finals were against St Finian's (Swords).

Cabinteely GAA's pitches are shared with Foxrock Cabinteely with the main adult pitch located in Kilbogget Park and 2 additional juvenile pitches in Kilbogget Park, one beside the Seapoint rugby pitches, and the other behind the housing estate in Coolevin, Ballybrack.

In 2022, a year after the camogie juvenile section was launched in the club, a decision was made to change all shorts / skorts from the white to blue for all teams across all codes. In 2022 the club also started "Na Réaltaí", a free weekly fun session for young children with additional needs who were not otherwise comfortable or able to participate in organised matches.

Following the commencement of works in May 2023 to replace and upgrade the adult pitch in Kilbogget, the 2 clubs were given priority use of the new adult and juvenile GAA pitches in Ticknick Park, Cherrywood for the duration of the works, with the new pitch hoped to be ready for use Q4 2024 / Q1 2025. The existing juvenile pitches and clubhouse were unaffected by these works.

The new pitch and floodlights opened in October 2024.

== Notable former players ==
- Andy Keogh (former English Premier League soccer player and Irish International striker)
- Dan Connor (former English Football League, League of Ireland and international soccer player)
- Conor Hoey (former Irish international cricketer)
- Sinéad Goldrick (inter county Dublin LGFA footballer, multiple senior All Ireland winner (club level with Foxrock Cabinteely, inter county with Dublin LGFA) and AFLW Aussie Rules 2022 (S7) Grand Final winner with Melbourne)
- Richard Boyd-Barrett (Irish politician)
- Maurice Leahy (former inter county Dublin GAA footballer)
- Brian McGrath (former Wicklow inter county footballer and inter county Dublin Masters footballer)
- Ian McKeever (mountaineer and charitable fundraiser)
- Shane O'Brien (inter county hurling player, coach and Manager Dublin GAA and Westmeath GAA)
- Chris Fields (MMA champion)
- Barry Drumm (former Irish International basketballer)
- Eoghan Lawlor (inter county Kerry Masters footballer)
- John O'Callaghan (former inter county Dublin GAA footballer and 1995 All Ireland Football Championship winner)
- Jimi Shields (musician)
- Larry O'Gara (former League of Ireland soccer player with UCD)
- Robbie Griffin (former League of Ireland soccer player with UCD, St Patrick's Athletic, Waterford United, and Kildare County)
