= Kindlestown Castle =

Ruined hall house castle in County Wicklow, Ireland

- Caisleán Bhaile an Chinligh (Irish)
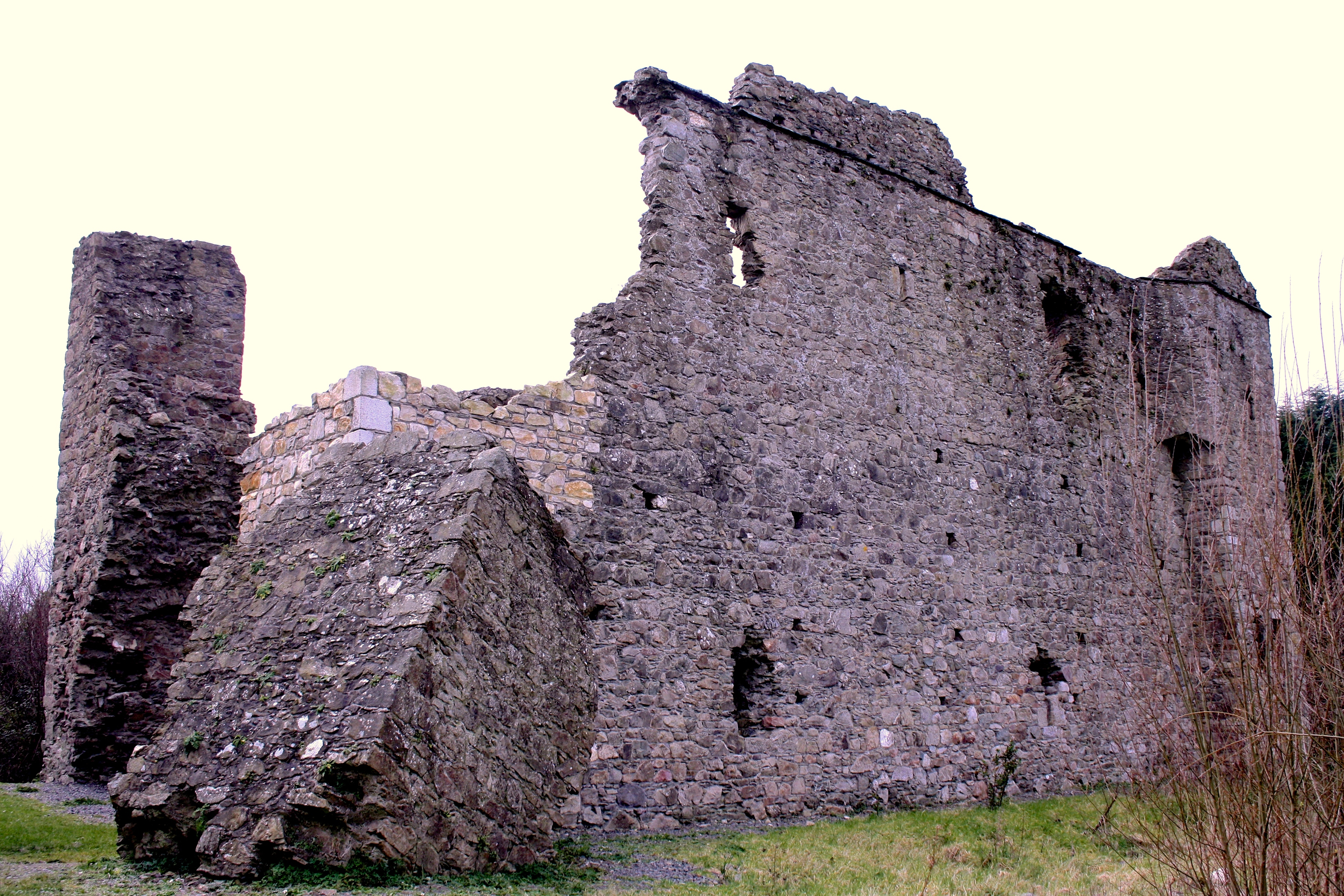

- Location within Ireland
- 53.141190°N 6.089022°W
- Type: Castle (hall house)
- Location: Kindlestown, Delgany, County Wicklow, Ireland

History
- Built: late 13th century

National monument of Ireland
- Official name: Kindlestown
- Reference no.: 323

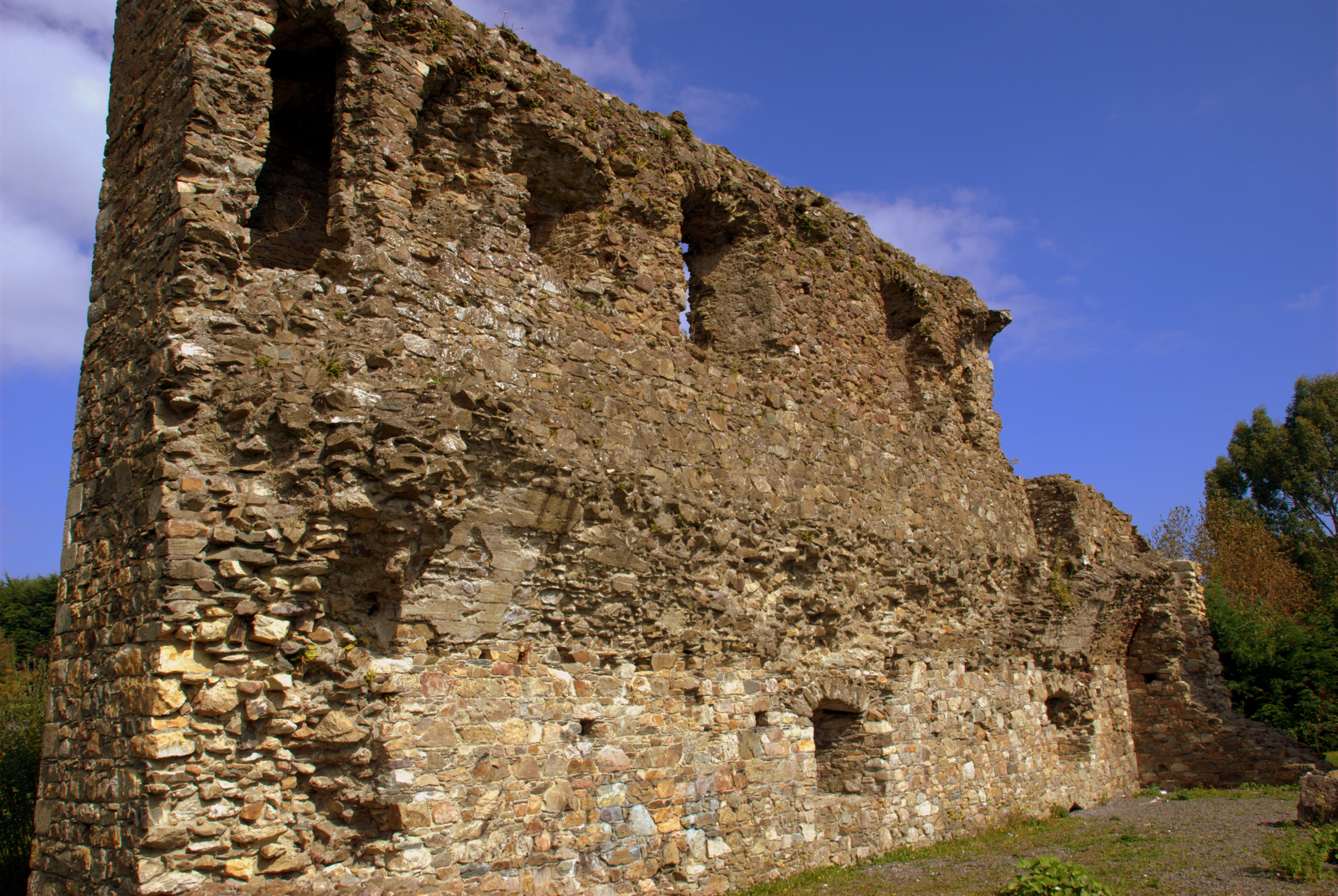
Northern wall, interior view

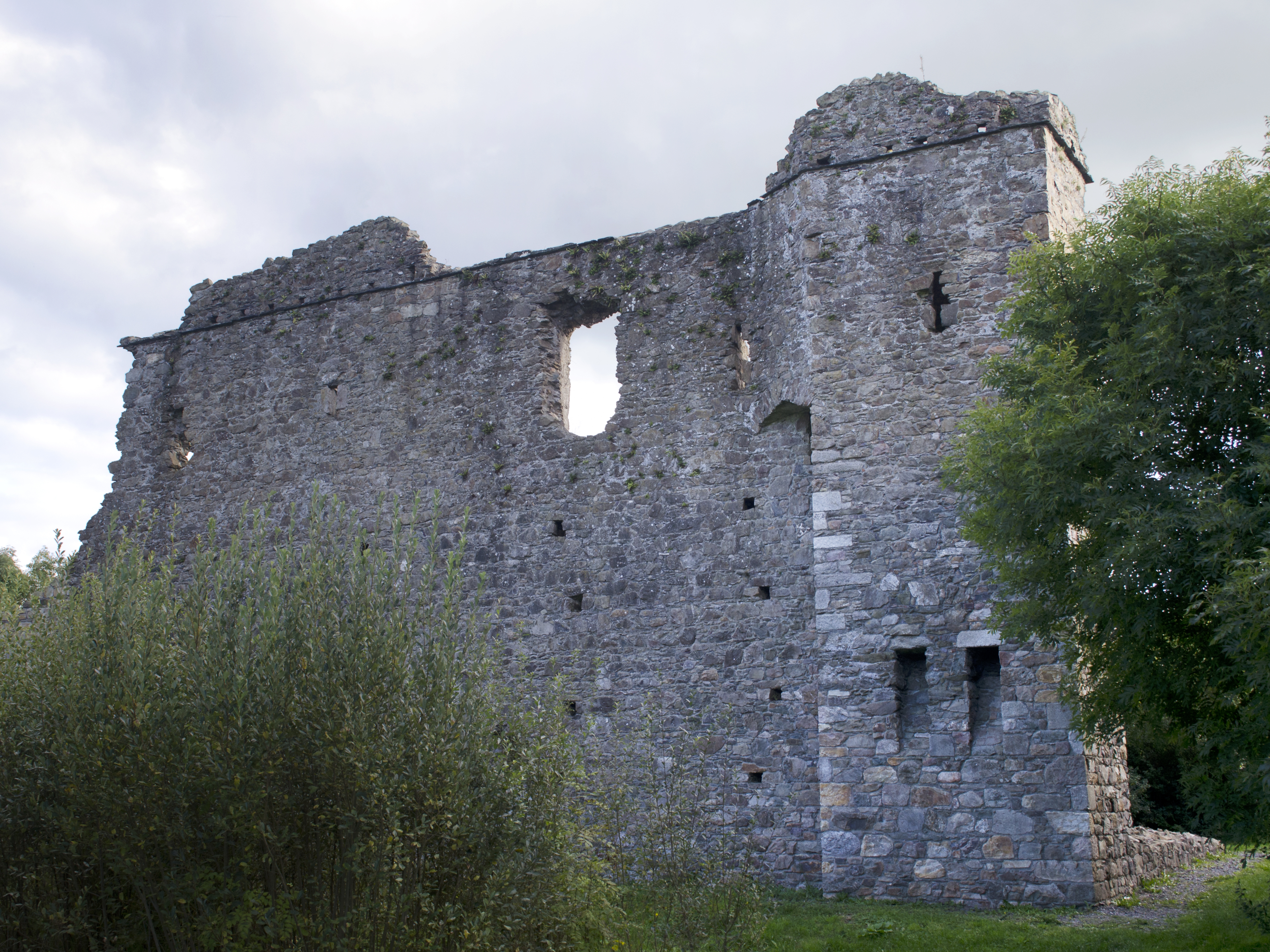
Northern wall, exterior view, with loophole visible.

Kindlestown Castle is a ruined hall house-style castle and a National Monument in Delgany, Ireland.

== Location ==
Kindlestown Castle is located astride the slopes of Kindlestown Hill, to the north of Delgany, 1.9 km (1.2 mi) west of Greystones railway station, and near the Dromont housing development.

== History ==
Kindlestown Castle is a late stone example of the hall house, commanding a good view of the countryside and the Irish Sea. The castle takes its name from its association with Albert de Kenley (Sheriff of Kildare in 1301) - de Kenley is believed to have erected it in the late 13th century. Others give it an earlier date of 1225, associating it with Walter de Bendeville.

De Kenley married Joan, the widow of Ralph Mac Giolla Mocholmág (Sir Ralph Fitzdermot) in 1292 and had custody of his lands for his stepson, John Fitzdermot. He retained some of the land for himself as can be seen from a deed dated 1304, and may have built the castle to protect against attack from the native Irish. In 1301 the Uí Broin (O'Byrnes) burned down nearby Rathdown Castle; the occupants may have taken refuge at Kindlestown. But John Fitzdermot had not the stomach for the fight with the Irish, conveying the manor of Rathdown about 1305 to Nigel le Brun, Escheator of Ireland. In 1377 the Uí Broin took Kindlestown itself. It was recovered by Robert Wikeford, Lord Chancellor of Ireland, and it later passed into the possession of the Archbold family.

Around 1402 there was another attempt by the O'Byrnes to take over, but Donnacha O'Byrne was defeated by the Archbolds. Kindlestown Castle flourished during this time and we know from the Inquisitions of James I that in 1621 it was surrounded by 400 acres (160 ha) of land and had a water mill.

The Archbolds fell into debt and Edward Archbold sold Kindlestown to William Brabazon, 1st Earl of Meath in 1630.

== Building ==
The castle, also called a hall house, measures externally 21 m (69 ft) by 9.8 m (32 ft) and is 8 m (26 ft) in height, with walls 1.5 m (4 ft 11 in) thick. The northern wall and part of the eastern wall survive intact to parapet level, but the southern and western walls were demolished in the post-medieval period. The surviving castle, two storeys high, is built of rough limestone, and the main features consist of a small projecting tower in the north-west corner, an original barrel vault at ground-floor level, and an entrance (at ground-floor level) and mural staircase in the eastern wall. The windows are small defensive arrowslits in the exterior, widening into segmental-arched embrasures in the interior. Window-seats survive at first-floor level. The remains of a slated parapet and stone string-course are also visible in the front façade.
