= Ballybrack =

Suburb of Dublin, Ireland

Ballybrack An Baile Breac (Irish)
- Suburb
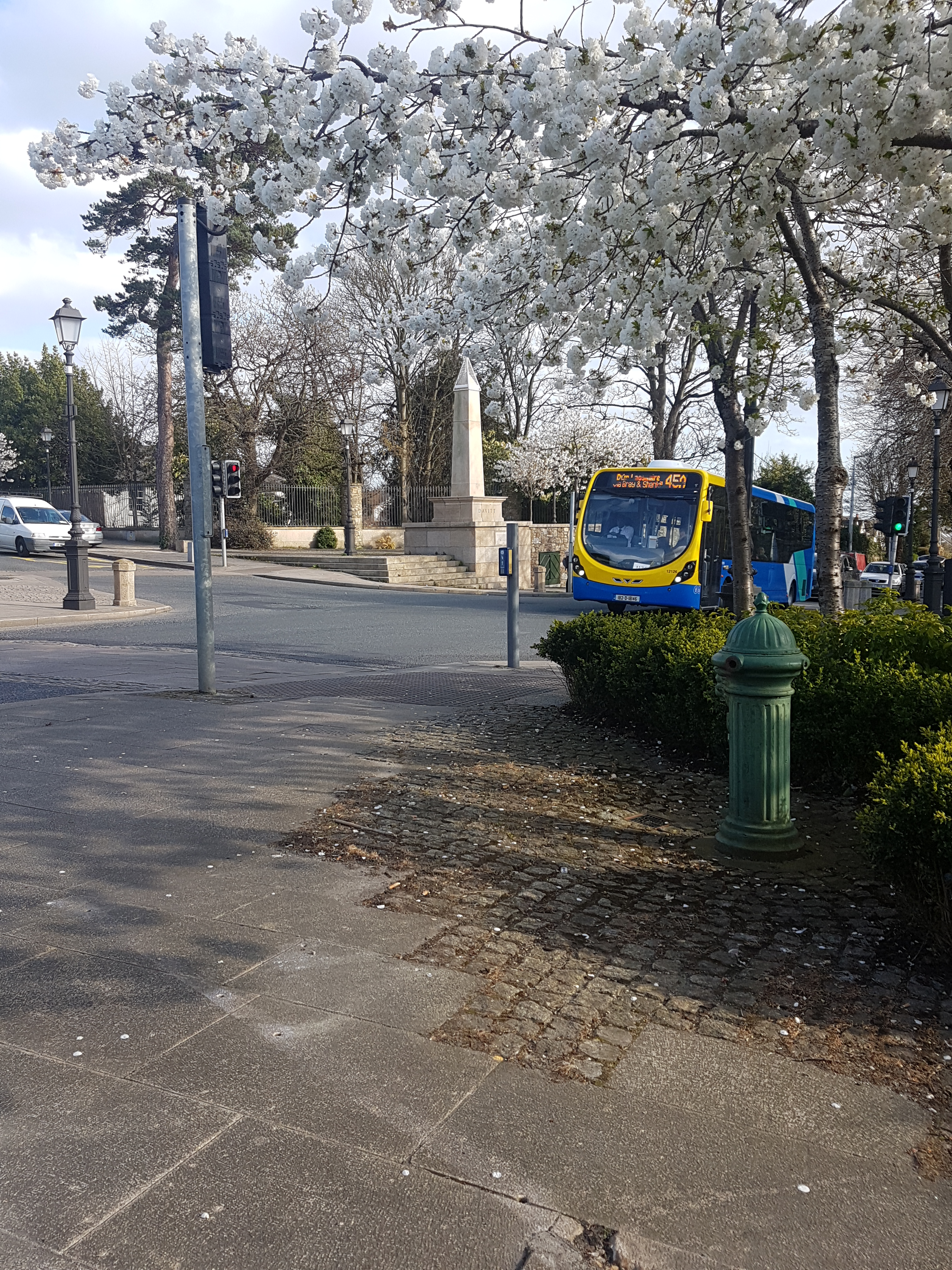
- Ballybrack Village

- Location in Dublin Ballybrack (Ireland)
- Coordinates: 53.2531°N 6.124466°W
- Country: Ireland
- Province: Leinster
- County: Dún Laoghaire–Rathdown
- Time zone: UTC±0 (WET)
  - Summer (DST): UTC+1 (IST)
- Eircode routing key: A96
- Telephone area code: +353(0)1

Ballybrack (Irish: An Baile Breac, meaning 'the speckled townland') is an outer residential suburb of Dublin, Ireland. It is in the south of County Dublin, in the Dún Laoghaire–Rathdown council area. The suburb is 14 km south-east of Dublin city centre, and is south-west of Killiney, north-east of Loughlinstown, east of Cabinteely and north of Shankill.

== Population ==
The population of the eponymous townland is 3,901 according to the 2016 census with the actual population of the modern area closer to 6,000 (incorporating Ashlawn Park, Holly / Cedar Court area and Cromlech Fields).

== Amenities ==
Ballybrack has a post office, a newsagent, a petrol station, two public houses, three barber shops, a café, a pizza restaurant, dry cleaners, two pharmacies, and a small shopping centre. There are also two Roman Catholic churches in the area.

== Transport ==
The area is well served by a number of different transport links, with Dublin Bus and Go-Ahead Ireland running the 7, 7A, 7B, 45, 45A, 45B and 111 services from the city centre and Dun Laoghaire town centre which serves the locality. Killiney DART station (originally Killiney and Ballybrack station, until 1921) is a 12-minute walk from the village and the Luas Green line stops at Cherrywood and Brides Glen are a 20-minute walk and both serve the city and a number of southside suburbs.

The N11 primary route and the M50 orbital motorway both have exits close to Ballybrack.

== Education ==
Local schools are St. John's and Scoil Cholmcille, while the local Gaelscoil is Gaelscoil Phádraig, which continues to grow year-on-year from a modest start in 1995. The area is also served by a nearby co-educational secondary school, St Laurence College.

== Sport ==
Local sports clubs include soccer club Ballybrack FC and Ballybrack/Borough Boxing Club, while the area is also served by nearby GAA Clubs Foxrock–Cabinteely GAA, Cabinteely GAA and Seapoint RFC Rugby Club.

In 2005, Foxrock Girls and the ladies' section of Cabinteely GAA club merged to form a new club offering a broader programme of football for all age groups in their catchment area. They are based at Kilbogget Park between Cabinteely and Ballybrack. The club has so far won at underage level the All-Ireland Division 1 Féile for U14s in 2005, All-Ireland U14 7s in the same year and numerous Dublin Leagues and Championships. The adult team won the 2007 VHI All-Ireland Junior Championship, 2007 All-Ireland Junior 7s Shield and in 2008 were Dublin Intermediate League and Championship winners.

Ballybrack Football Club was formerly known as KBY FC, the initials representing the areas of Killiney, Ballybrack and Loughlinstown. KBY was founded in 1972, and Ballybrack FC was officially formed in 1975. At present Ballybrack has 13 teams competing in both the Dublin and District Schoolboys League and the South Dublin Football League. The soccer club provides football for boys and girls at all levels of ability, and at ages from seven to eighteen years in the areas of Ballybrack, Cabinteely and Shankill. Football matches are played in Coolevin on Saturdays and Sundays. The football club is open five nights a week and at the weekends provides recreation and leisure activities. The soccer club's membership exceeds 300 children. Approximately one-third comprise the Ballybrack Tigers, catering to children five to seven years old. Every year the club plays host to a mini-World Cup tournament for all children of the local community. Ballybrack FC also has under-21s and a senior team competing in both the Leinster Football League and the Leinster Senior League. The Seniors won the Tom Cullen Cup and came R\UP in their league in 2013, with the u\21s coming R\UP in the LFL Development cup in 2013, both teams in their first seasons. The club also has a full-size state-of-the-art FIFA-approved all-weather pitch.

== Notable people ==
- Michael Davitt, The Irish Land League founder lived at Land League Cottage, Ballybrack for a time after his marriage in 1886
- Paul Howard, author and creator of the Ross O'Carroll Kelly series, grew up in Ballybrack
- Adrian Kennedy, radio presenter
- Seán Lemass, Taoiseach from 1959 until 1966, was born and lived in Ballybrack
