= Rathdown Castle =

Ruined castle south of Dublin

- Ráth Oinn (Irish)
- Rath-oinn
- Location within Ireland
- 53°09′30″N 6°04′28″W
- Type: Castle
- Location: Rathdown Upper, Greystones, County Wicklow, Ireland

History
- Built: 13th century; rebuilt after 1308

Site notes
- Architectural style: Norman

Rathdown Castle is a ruined castle and ancient settlement site located in County Wicklow, Ireland.

== Location ==
Rathdown Castle was located in a deep ravine immediately northeast of Kindlestown Castle and north of Greystones village. In the field to the north of the castle are visible remains of a moated enclosure, with other subsurface features.

== History ==
Archaeological evidence suggests there has been continuous settlement there from at least the Early Neolithic (4th millennium BC), and through to the early medieval period, when it was the site of the Gaelic Irish settlement Rath Oinn (perhaps "ringfort of the pine/furze.")

The legendary account in Annals of the Four Masters (compiled 1632–36) claims that Rath Oinn was constructed by Érimón, one of the first Milesian kings of Ireland:

This was the year in which Eremhon and Emher assumed the joint sovereignty of Ireland, and divided Ireland into two parts between them. It was in it, moreover, that these acts following were done by Eremhon and Emher, with their chieftains: Rath Beothaigh, over the Eoir at Argat Ros, and Rath Oinn in Crich Cualann, were erected by Eremhon.

This event is dated to 1699 BC; however, dates in the ancient annals prior to c. AD 500 are not considered factual. Nonetheless, the prominence given to Rath Oinn in the accounts shows that it must have been an important centre in the distant, poorly-remembered past. The Lebor Gabála Érenn (11th century) also states that "Rath Oinn in the land of Cualu was dug by Érimón."

At the time of the Norman invasion, Rathdown was the stronghold of the Uí Dúnchada, at that time led by Donal Mac Gilla Mo-Cholmóc, king of Cuala.

Henry II granted the Manor of Rathdown to Donal as tenant-in-chief. A stone castle, known as Rathdown Castle, was probably built soon after the Normans arrived. In 1301 the O'Byrnes (Uí Broin) burned down Rathdown Castle, and the occupant may have moved to Kindlestown Castle. The Normanised Mac Gilla Mo-Cholmóc owner of the lands, John Fitzdermot, did not retake Rathdown Castle, in c. 1305 conveying the manor of Rathdown to Nigel le Brun, Escheator of Ireland, and the castle was rebuilt in 1308.

Associated with the castle was a village of several hundred people with a mill and a church (St. Crispin's Cell; the current building dates to 1530). In 1534, a castle, 20 houses, a watermill and a creek were recorded at Rathdown. In 1536 the castle and lands were granted to Peter Talbot.

Rathdown Castle and village survived to the early 1600s, being the subject of occasional raids by Gaelic tribes, such as the O'Byrnes and O'Tooles of the Wicklow Mountains region.

In the Down Survey (1657) Rathdown Castle was recorded as "ruinous." It gives its name to the baronies of Rathdown (County Dublin) and Rathdown (County Wicklow), and to the modern county of Dún Laoghaire–Rathdown.

In 1771, 20 acres were acquired by Captain Charles Tarrant who built Captain Tarrant's Farmhouse; he was involved in the construction of the Grand Canal and the Wide Streets Commission. He used stone from the castle ruins to build his house, and more of the stone was used for a railway bridge.

In 2010, excavation in the area revealed "a series of small-scale features within the area of the known extended settlement" and medieval potsherds. Later work identified Beaker-era settlement and evidence of a corn-drying kiln.
