= Deansgrange =

Suburb of Dublin, Ireland

Deansgrange Gráinseach an Déin (Irish)
- Suburb
- Location in Ireland
- Coordinates: 53°16′43″N 6°09′50″W
- Country: Ireland
- Province: Leinster
- County: Dún Laoghaire–Rathdown
- Elevation: 53 m (174 ft)
- Time zone: UTC+0 (WET)
  - Summer (DST): UTC-1 (IST (WEST))
- Eircode routing key: A94
- Telephone area code: +353(0)1

Deansgrange (Irish: Gráinseach an Déin, meaning 'The Dean's Grange') is a southern suburb of Dublin, centred on the crossroads of Clonkeen Road and Kill Lane. The area shares the name Clonkeen (Irish: Cluain Chaoin, meaning 'Beautiful Meadow') with the area further east, known as Kill of the Grange (i.e. "Church of the Grange of ": referring to Grange Church (now in ruins)).

== History and etymology ==
Since early medieval times the area was owned by the Augustinians, and used as a grange, giving rise to the medieval civil parish of Kill, in the half-barony of Rathdown. The Ordnance Survey Ireland map 1837–1842 shows a "Grange Church" (now in ruins, the modern housing estate surrounding it is called Kill Abbey), "Kill Abbey" (still existing), "Grange House" (demolished with the building of the South Park estate), and "Glebe House" (still existing). Deansgrange was a townland of Kill Parish. Presumably the dean of the grange lived in Grange House, and so the area became known as "the Dean's Grange", and then simply, Deansgrange.

== Geography ==
The crossroads are the commercial centre for the surrounding low-density housing estates, with a number of commercial outlets. The R827 road runs roughly north-south through Deansgrange from Blackrock to Cabinteely. South of the crossroads is Clonkeen Road, leading to Clonkeen College, while north is Deansgrange Road leading to Deansgrange Cemetery. Kill Lane runs roughly east (to Baker's Corner crossroads and Kill of the Grange) and west (to Foxrock).

== Amenities ==
Schools in the area include Kill o' the Grange National School and Clonkeen College. A Dun Laoghaire-Rathdown County Council library is located at Deansgrange.

Local sports clubs include Meadow Vale Tennis, Geraldines Patrick Moran GAA Club, and Granada FC soccer club.

== Churches ==
Kill Church was designed by Welland and Gillespie architects in 1863 and built by James Douglass. James McAllister was the supervising architect. The foundation stone was laid in July 1863 and it cost €1,600. In 1931 Hubert McGoldrick designed a 'The Good Shepheard' leaded glass window.

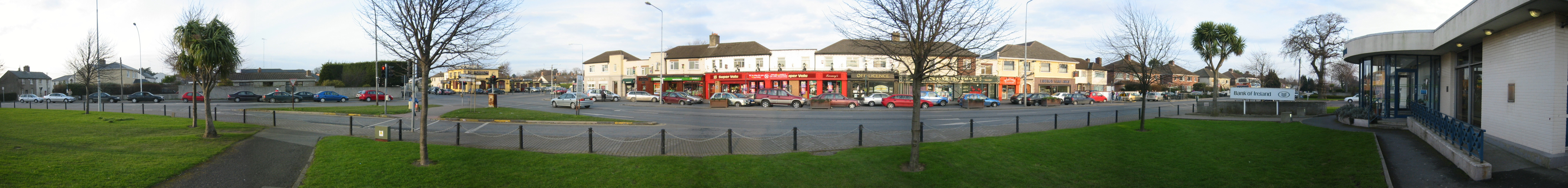
Part of central Deansgrange, prior to 2007's major development of the Bank of Ireland site and landscaping of the crossroads

== Cemetery ==
Deansgrange Cemetery is, together with Glasnevin and Mount Jerome, one of the largest cemeteries in Dublin and is the burial place of many famous people, including Flann O'Brien, Count John McCormack, Frank O'Connor, Eamon Martin, Seán Lemass, Dermot Morgan, Delia Murphy, Sinéad O'Connor and the Nobel Laureate Ernest Walton.
