= Cornelscourt =

Suburb of Dublin, Ireland

Cornelscourt Cúirt Choirnéil (Irish)
- Suburb
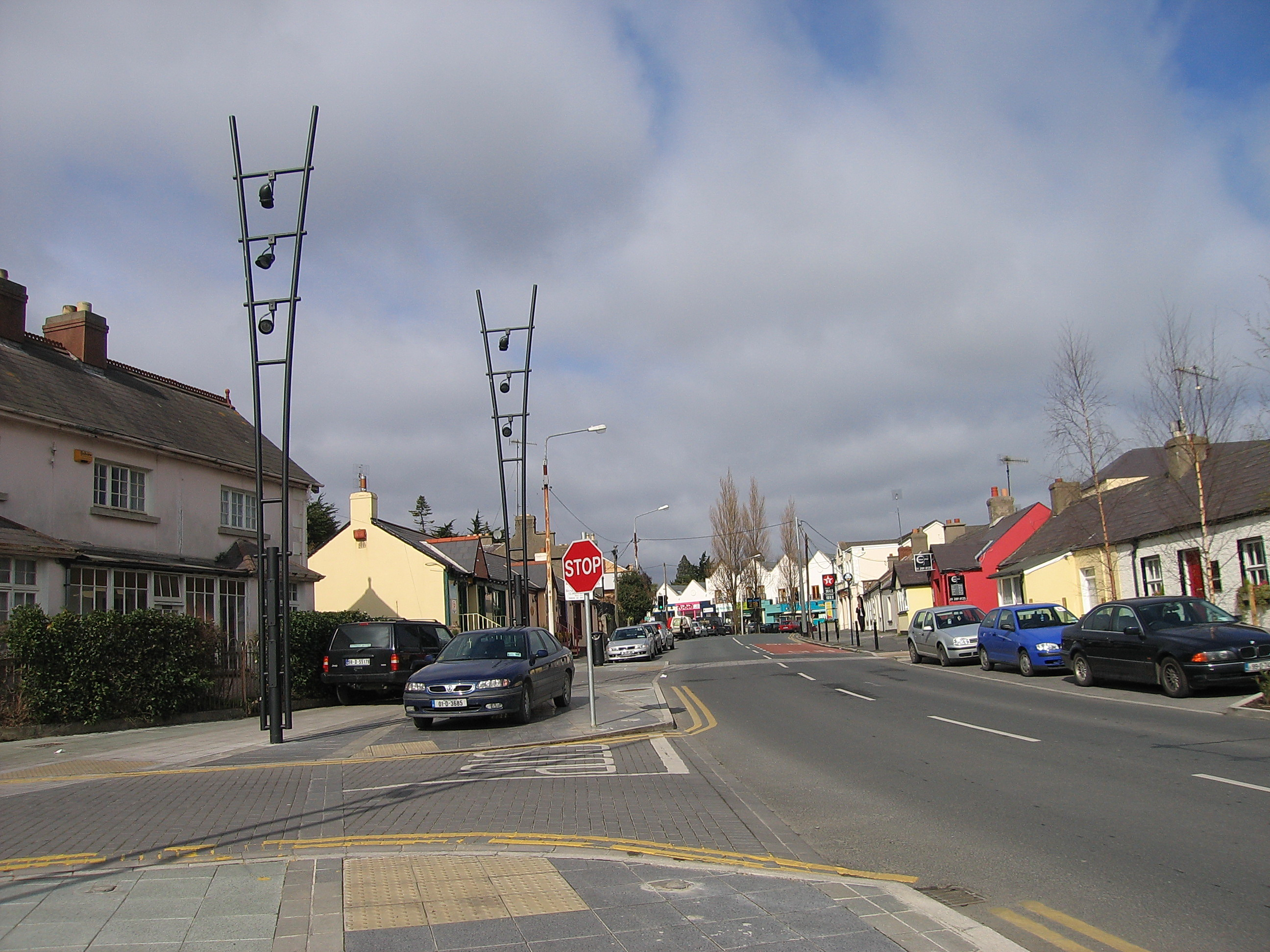
- Cornelscourt village

- Location in Ireland
- Coordinates: 53.26602°N 6.16041°W
- Country: Ireland
- Province: Leinster
- County: County Dublin

Government
  - Dáil Éireann: Dún Laoghaire
- Time zone: UTC+0 (WET)
  - Summer (DST): UTC-1 (IST (WEST))
- Eircode routing key: D18
- Area code: 01 (+3531)
- Irish Grid Reference: O244235

Cornelscourt (Irish: Cúirt Choirnéil) is a small suburban area within the traditional County Dublin, now in the jurisdiction of Dún Laoghaire–Rathdown. Situated between Cabinteely, Carrickmines and Foxrock, it is a primarily residential area, but is perhaps best known for being the site of a branch of Dunnes Stores, and the country's first drive-through bank.

== Geography ==
Cornelscourt has an area of 44.95 hectares. It stretches west to Kerrymount Avenue, south to the Old Bray Road, and east across the N11 to include all of Monaloe (directly behind Clonkeen College). Cornelscourt is in the civil parish of Kill, within the barony of Rathdown. It is also in the electoral division of Stillorgan.

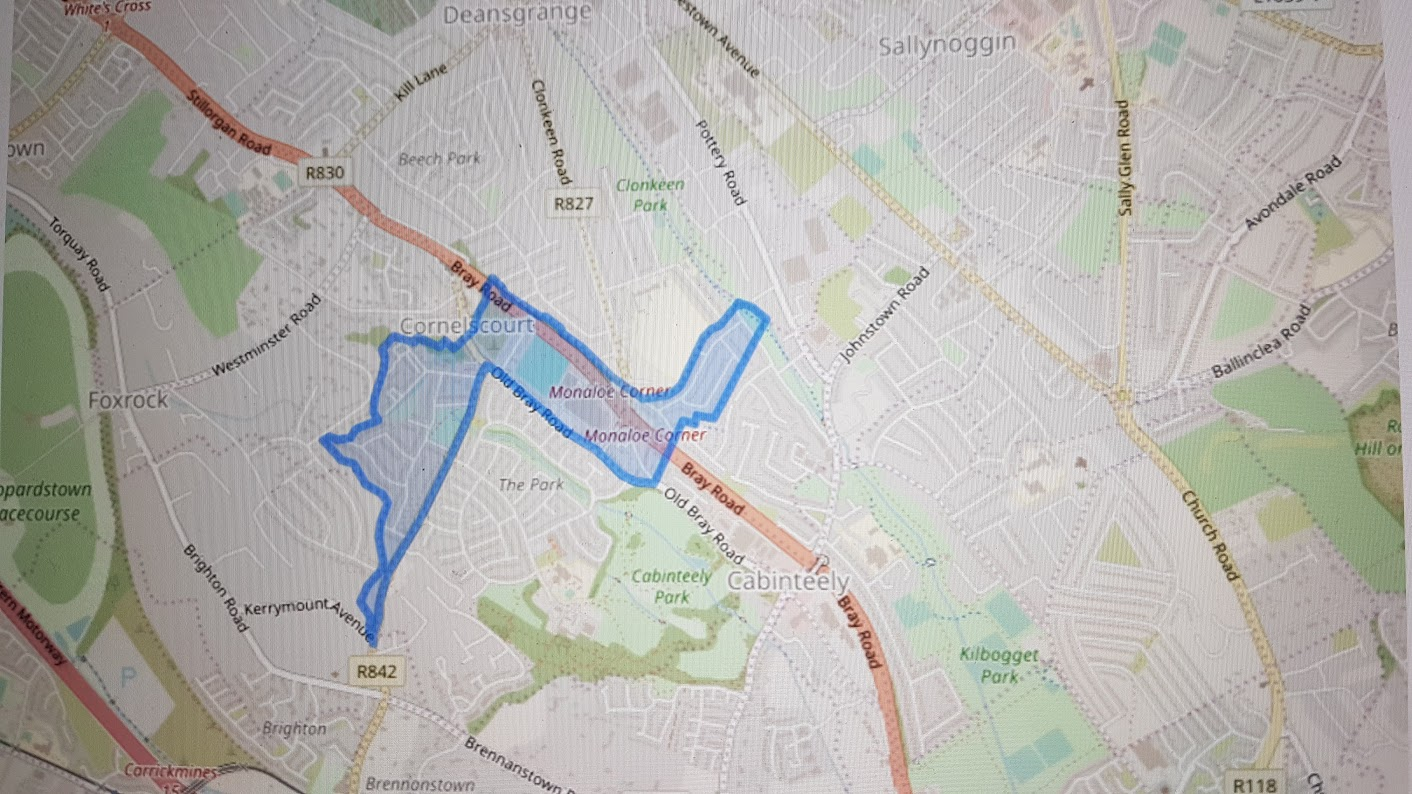
Map of Cornelscourt

Cornelscourt consists of houses and shops on either side of a section of the bypassed Old Bray Road, between the junction with the N11 to the east. Along this strip are a petrol station, several food outlets, a drama school, a convenience store, a pharmacy and the Dunnes Stores supermarket. Also along the strip was pub called "The Magic Carpet" [now closed] which contained one of Ireland's first non-smoking lounges in a pub – the "Samuel Beckett" lounge, named after a former customer – and which had an exhibition space, the "Gallery Intermarium"; a 60-seat theatre named the "Dolmen Theatre" opened above the pub in 2015 and closed in 2020. The surrounding suburban housing is laid out in housing estates.

Ireland's first experimental drive-through bank opened in Cornelscourt in 1990 and closed 12 years later.

A bronze sculpture Eoinín na nÉan (Eoineen of the Birds) by Colm J. Brennan was erected in 2008.

== Transport ==
A number of bus routes operated by Dublin Bus as well as Go-Ahead Ireland serve Cornelscourt such as the 63, 63A 84, 84a, 84x, 133, 143, 145 and 155. The Aircoach 702 route also stops at Cabinteely Cross on its route from Greystones to Dublin Airport.

The Luas Green Line passes near Cornelscourt, with Carrickmines as its nearest stop, which is a 20-minute walk to Cornelscourt with a journey time of less than 40 minutes to Dublin City Centre.

== Local area plan ==
The area has been designated a 'District Centre' by Dún Laoghaire–Rathdown County Council. A local area plan for the area is being implemented with the aim of making aesthetic and functional improvements through redesign of road layout, street furniture etc.

== See also ==
- List of towns and villages in the Republic of Ireland
