= Health Professions Admissions Test =

Irish university admissions test

The Health Professions Admissions Test - Ireland (HPAT - Ireland) is a university admissions test used by all universities in Ireland for admissions to medicine courses, and by the University of Ulster for some medicine related courses.

The test is a computer-based, 2.5 hour, 114 multiple-choice question exam independently developed by the Australian Council for Educational Research (ACER). There is also a Written English component which is used by the University of Limerick for entrance into the MSc Occupational Therapy and MSc Speech and Language Therapy courses.

== Format ==
According to ACER, the HPAT is designed with the purpose of "Assessing skills for academic success in medical and allied health courses" by " Assessing logical reasoning and problem-solving skills, non-verbal reasoning and the ability to understand the thoughts, behaviour and intention of others."

The HPAT consists of three mandatory sections as well as an optional Written English component designed to test different skills in the candidate. The subtests are all separately timed and are outlined below

- Logical Reasoning and Problem Solving: Involves comprehending and analysing information to formulate a solution or plausible hypotheses. The candidate is allocated 60 minutes to answer 42 questions in this section.
- Interpersonal Understanding: Assesses the ability to identify, understand, and, infer the thoughts, feelings, behaviour and/or intent of others. The candidate is allocated 50 minutes to answer 42 questions in this section.
- Non-Verbal Reasoning: Designed to assess the ability to reason in the abstract and solve problems in non-verbal contexts. The candidate is allocated 40 minutes to answer 30 questions in this section.
- Written English: Assesses the ability to create a fluent, creative and organised piece of writing in response to a prompt. The candidate is allocated 60 minutes to compose two separate essays based on given prompts.

Previously, the test was taken at one of the examination centres across Ireland. Now, candidates must sit the test on their own devices and be subject to remote proctoring.

== Content and preparation ==
According to ACER, the HPAT exam "does not draw on any particular body of knowledge or curriculum" and "does not test academic knowledge and doesn't require special understanding of any academic disciplines".

Official preparation materials are offered by ACER on their website. Past papers are not available.

Some private companies also offer preparation courses for the test, however, these are not recommended, authorised by, or in any way associated with ACER.

== Scoring ==
The HPAT has a maximum score of 300. Candidates will receive an individual score for each of the three sections as well as an overall score and a percentile ranking. The overall score is calculated using the following formula:

Overall Score = [(2 × Section 1 + 2 × Section 2 + 1 × Section 3) ÷ 5] × 3

ACER does not reveal exactly how the raw scores are transformed into scaled scores to calculate the overall score, stating they are "calculated in accordance with psychometric principles"
