= Clonkeen College =

School in County Dublin, Ireland

- Coláiste Chluain Chaoin

Location
- Deansgrange, Blackrock, County Dublin, Ireland; 53.2699°N 6.1572°W

Information
- Motto: Tada Gan Iarracht (Irish: 'Nothing without Effort')
- Established: 1965
- Principal: Edward Melly
- Enrollment: 525
- Colour
- Religious order: Christian Brothers
- Website: clonkeencollege.ie

Clonkeen College is a Christian Brothers secondary school for boys in Dún Laoghaire-Rathdown, South County Dublin.

== History ==
The Ordnance Survey Ireland map 1837–1842 shows Clonkeen School Ho[use], located in the present day Cornelscourt Village. Although the same building appears on the OSI 1888–1913 map, it is not named as a school any more.

The original junior school was St. Joseph's Private Preparatory School, built in September 1965 close to where the present Clonkeen College stands. It was run by a staff of three Christian Brothers until the school was closed in 1975. The secondary school was also called St. Joseph's, until renamed Clonkeen College.

The present school stands on the site of Charles Stewart Parnell’s second last public meeting. The first pupils to the current school were admitted in the autumn of 1970, there was one fifth-year class and two third-year classes (there was no fourth year then). Thirteen students completed the first Leaving Certificate. The school principal was Br. Jo Hogan; other original teachers were Br. Collins and Mr. B. Toomey. The school was officially opened by David Andrews TD on 31 January 1972.

In 2019, Clonkeen College underwent substantial renovations, adding facilities including a gym, sports hall and new science classrooms.

== Curriculum ==
Subjects offered at the school include:

=== Junior cycle subjects ===
- Irish
- English
- Mathematics
- French
- Geography
- History
- Science
- Business studies
- Art
- Civic, social and political education
- Religious education
- Physical education
- Music

=== Senior cycle subjects ===
- Irish
- English
- Mathematics
- French
- Geography
- History
- Physics
- Chemistry
- Biology
- Business
- Economics
- Accounting
- Art
- Religious education
- Physical education
- Music
- Design communication graphics
- Applied mathematics – extracurricular
- LCVP – extracurricular

== Transition year (TY) ==
The school operates a Transition Year (TY) program. The year's main outing is a tour organised by the TY coordinator. Previous TY classes have visited undertaken trips to a number of European cities.

During the year, TY students also have the opportunity to do courses such as: self-defense, ECDL, Gaelic football, FAI coaching, and sailing. Other subjects in the transition year include cooking, music, Spanish and technical drawing. The students have an opportunity to attain a Gaisce/Presidents Award.

== Student council ==
Students have input into the schools running in the form of a student council of class representatives from all years, who are elected by their peers. The council meets weekly to discuss projects or issues and is composed of twenty four representatives.

Students also elect a head boy and deputy head boy each year. These roles are filled by 5th-year students, who are elected by the entire student body, parent teachers' association and teachers.

== Sport ==
In athletics (track and field), the school participates in east Leinster athletics competitions. Clonkeen also enters runners in the under-15 and under-17 east Leinster cross country running competitions.

The school participates in Gaelic football competitions at several age levels, and has won three Dublin titles (in 1975, 1976 and 2003). The school also fields teams in hurling competitions.

1st, 2nd and 3rd year students take part in the Dublin junior match play golf competition, and the school has entered soccer teams in competitions at under-14, under-16 and under-18 level. The school was Leinster Junior Champions in 1981–1982.

Other sports undertaken at Clonkeen College include basketball, chess, rugby union, sailing, swimming, tennis and volleyball.

== Extracurricular activities ==
The school's debating society has participated in a number of debates for both junior and senior debaters. Clonkeen also has a tradition of performing annual drama and musical productions. Plays and musicals are also performed by Transition Year students.

Annually, the school hosts a "Clongitude" music competition (named for the "Longitude Festival") in which students perform to win prizes.

== Notable alumni ==
- Stephen Byrne – (RTÉ) presenter
- Oisin Gough – Dublin hurler
- Alan Judge – professional footballer
- Jason Knight – professional footballer for Bristol City F.C. and Ireland national team
- Tommy Lyons – former Dublin football manager
- Colum McCann – international writer and novelist
- Kevin Nolan – Dublin Gaelic Footballer
- Darren O'Dea – professional footballer
- Glenn Quinn – television and film actor (deceased)
- David Treacy – Dublin hurler
- Prof. Philip Nolan – Director General of Science Foundation Ireland, former NPHET chair, former president of Maynooth University, former deputy president of University College Dublin
