= Irish History Junior Certificate Examination =

School examination in Ireland

The Irish History Junior Certificate Examination is an achievement test on world history that is offered to students in Ireland.

It is one of a suite of Junior Certificate Examinations the country uses to assess students. It has two difficulty levels, Higher and Ordinary. This subject is not required at a national level. However, many schools make it compulsory. Most students choose to complete the Higher Level exam.

== Ordinary level ==
The Ordinary Level exam lasts 90 minutes. It includes four questions. The maximum score is 180.

Questions
Number	Type	Mark	Recommended time to spend
Question 1	Sources: Pictures	35 marks	15 minutes
Question 2	Sources: Documents	35 marks	15 minutes
Question 3	Short Questions	60 marks	20 minutes
Question 4	People in History	50 marks	30 minutes

== Higher level ==
The exam lasts 150 minutes. It includes six questions. The maximum score is 270.

Questions
Number	Type	Mark	Recommended time to spend
Question 1	Picture Questions	35 marks	10 minutes
Question 2	Document Questions	35 marks	10 minutes
Question 3	Short Questions	60 marks	20 minutes
Question 4	People in History	50 marks	25 minutes
Question 5	Long Document Question	30 marks	15 minutes
Question 6	One of four options (see below)	60 marks	20 minutes

Questions 1, 2 and 5 are mandatory. Only 10 of the 20 sub-questions in Question 3 are required. Question 4 includes two sections. One sub-question from each section must be answered. In Question 6, only two of four possible sub-questions need to be completed. The four sub-question topics are:

- Question A: Unknown until exam
- Question B: Social Life
- Question C: Political History
- Question D: World War I & World War II

== Topics ==
Topics include:

- Historians, Archaeologists, Sources
- Ancient Rome
- Ancient Ireland
- Early Christian Ireland
- The Middle Ages/Medieval times
- Monks and Friars
- The Renaissance
- Exploration and Discovery
- The Reformation
- Plantations in Ireland
- The American Revolution: 1775-1881
- The French Revolution: 1789-1799
- The Revolution in Ireland:1798
- The Agricultural Revolution
- The Industrial Revolution
- The Transport Revolution
- Ireland in the mid-nineteenth century
- The Home Rule Crisis in Ireland:1910-1914
- The Easter Rising and After:1916-1918
- War of independence and Civil War:1919-1923
- Cumann nan Gaedheal in power:1923-1932
- Fianna Fáil in Government:1932-1948
- The Inter-Party Government:1948-1951
- From 1950 onward (Different Governments)
- Northern Ireland:1920-2000
- Dictatorship (knowledge of characteristics)
- Fascist Italy
- The Nazis take power in Germany
- Hitler's Five Steps to War
- World War II:1939-1945
- The Super-powers & the Cold War:1945-1991
- Social Changes in 20th Century Ireland
