= Rathdown (County Wicklow barony) =

Rathdown Ráth an Dúin (Irish)
- Barony
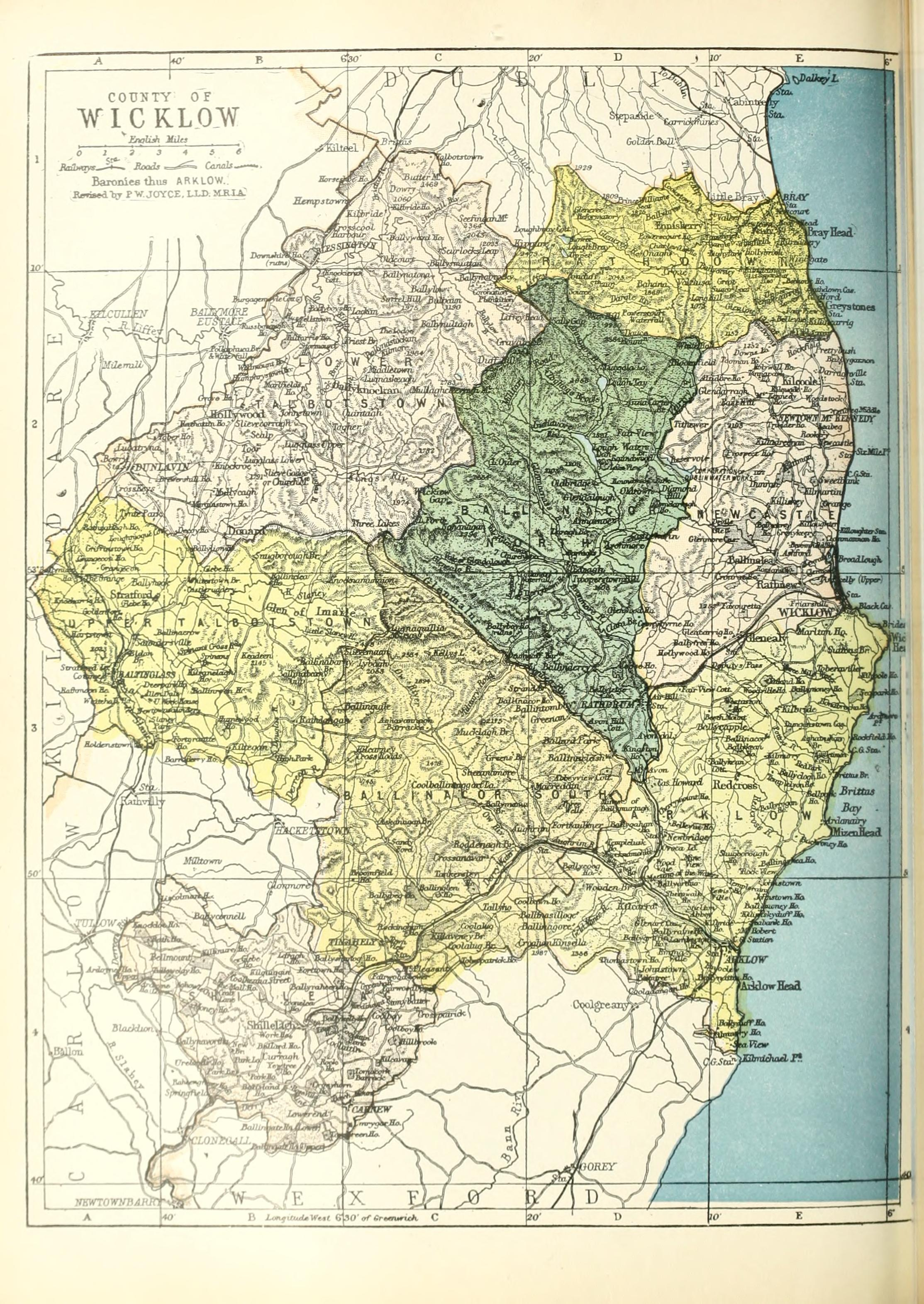
- Baronies of County Wicklow. Rathdown is in the northeast.
- Sovereign state: Ireland
- County: Wicklow

Area
  - Total: 135.42 km^{2} (52.29 sq mi)

Rathdown (Irish: Ráth an Dúin) is a barony in County Wicklow, Ireland.

== Etymology ==
Rathdown barony derives its name from Rathdown Castle, located near Greystones (Irish: Ráth an Dúin, "rath of the dún"; anciently Ráth Oinn).

== Location ==
Rathdown barony is located in northeastern County Wicklow, east of Kippure, north of the Glen of the Downs, south of the County Dublin border and opening onto the Irish Sea around Bray Head.

== History ==
The Uí Briuin Cualann are noted very early here, with their territory extending into southern County Dublin.

== List of settlements ==
Below is a list of settlements in Rathdown barony:

- Bray
- Enniskerry
- Greystones
