= Foxrock =

Suburb of Dublin, Ireland

Foxrock Carraig an tSionnaigh (Irish)
- Suburb
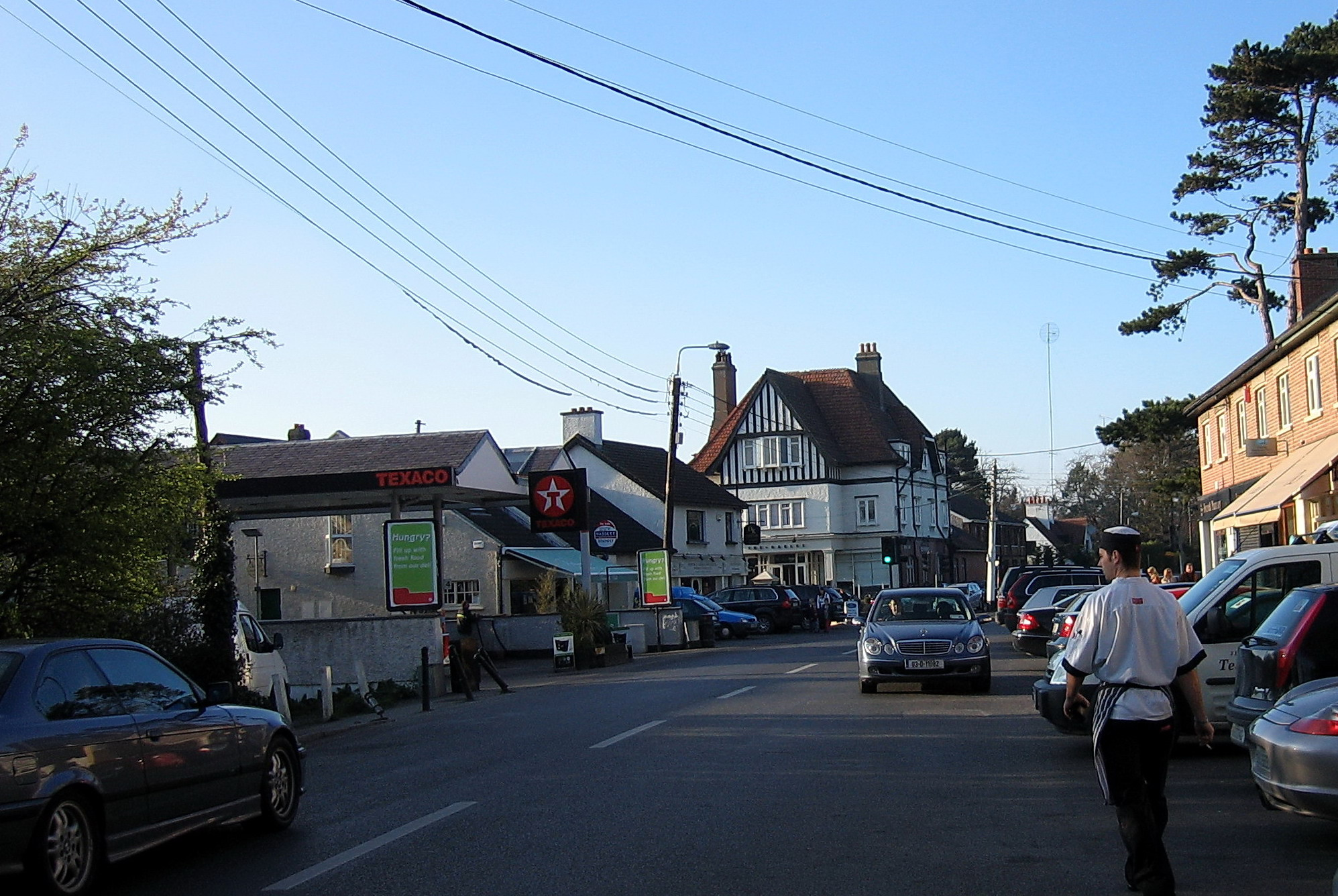
- Centre of Foxrock village:- Findlaters Grocery Store (centre) opened in 1904, now the Gables wine bar & restaurant

- Location in Dublin Foxrock (Ireland)
- Coordinates: 53°16′00″N 6°10′27″W
- Country: Ireland
- Province: Leinster
- County: County Dublin
- Local authority: Dún Laoghaire–Rathdown County Council
- Dáil constituency: Dún Laoghaire
- EP constituency: Dublin
- Elevation: 53 m (174 ft)

Population (2006)
  - Urban: 11,566
- Eircode routing key: D18
- Area code: 01 (+3531)
- Irish Grid Reference: O219256

Foxrock (Irish: Carraig an tSionnaigh) is an affluent suburb on the southside of Dublin, Ireland. It is within the county of Dún Laoghaire–Rathdown, in the postal district of Dublin 18 and in the Catholic parish of Foxrock.

== History ==
The suburb of Foxrock was developed by William and John Bentley and Edward and Anthony Fox, who, in 1859, leased the lands of the Foxrock Estate from the Ecclesiastical Commissioners and Richard Whately, the Church of Ireland Archbishop of Dublin, with the aim of creating an affluent garden suburb.

The development was facilitated by the existence of the Harcourt Street railway line, built in 1854, that put Dublin city within commuting distance. The developers donated a site to the Dublin Wicklow and Wexford Railway Company for Foxrock railway station, which opened in 1861. In 1862, the following advertisement was placed in The Irish Times:

Beautiful building sites for mansions and pretty villas – Foxrock estate. The improvements recently made on this property, and still progressing, together with its natural attractions render these sites unrivalled for suburban residences. The scenery (green and mountain) from Brighton Road just finished, leading from the hotel at Foxrock station to Carrickmines, is magnificent. The land, being undulating, affords perfectly sheltered positions on Torquay Road, to the railway station at Stillorgan and Foxrock, as well as others elevated and more bracing. The rents required are exceedingly moderate: leases for 900 years are granted. Bricks, stones, lime and sand from the estate are sold at reduced prices to tenants. Stage coaches and omnibuses ply regularly between Foxrock station and Kingstown. Fare 3 pence and 4 pence. There is cheap and excellent shopping at Foxrock market. The railway subscription only £7 per annum. Apply to W.W. Bentley, Foxrock, or Bentley and Son, 110 College Green.

The racecourse, Leopardstown Racecourse, was completed in 1888, and is the only remaining horse track in the greater metropolitan area. The golf club opened in 1898.

== Geography ==
The three main roads of the original development of Foxrock remain Brighton, Torquay and Westminster Roads. The boundaries of Foxrock as used by An Post extend east to take in the lands to the west of Clonkeen Road, Deansgrange Cemetery as far as Newtownpark Avenue. The N11 road runs through the area, as does a small stream.

Foxrock borders the suburbs of Carrickmines, Cornelscourt, Deansgrange and Leopardstown.

== Education ==
Foxrock has a number of primary schools, and one secondary school for girls only, Loreto Convent, Foxrock. Hollypark Boys and Girls primary schools also service the area.

== Transport ==
=== Rail ===
Foxrock was formerly served by the Harcourt Street railway line from central Dublin's Harcourt Street to Bray. A temporary platform opened in 1859 followed by a more permanent station in August 1861, finally closing in January 1959.

Foxrock is bypassed by the Luas Green Line light rail system which deviates from the old railway line. The nearest Luas stop to Foxrock is Carrickmines, which is where the Green Line rejoins the old railway route. Sandyford and Central Park are also considered local stops within proximity to Foxrock. There is another stop before Carrickmines for the racecourse, but as of 2010, this had yet to open.

=== Bus ===
Dublin Bus high-frequency service E1 and the rush-hour only X1 and X2 link Foxrock Church with the city centre. Dublin Bus route E2 also stops at Foxrock's Catholic church enroute to Dún Laoghaire. Go-Ahead routes L26 and L27 serve Cornelscourt Hill Road.

== People ==
- Samuel Beckett, writer, was born in 1906 in Cooldrinagh, on Kerrymount Ave.
- Joe Dolan, singer, had a house in Tresillian estate in Foxrock.
- Jerry Lee Lewis, American singer, songwriter, and pianist lived on Westminster Road in 1993.
- Miriam O'Callaghan, broadcaster, grew up in Foxrock.
- Horace Plunkett, agricultural reformer and senator, whose house Kilteragh was burnt down in 1923 by the Anti-Treaty IRA during the Irish Civil War.
- Chris Wolstenholme, musician, lived in Foxrock with his family.
