= Dún Laoghaire–Rathdown =

County in Ireland

Coordinates: 53°18′00″N 6°08′24″W

Dún Laoghaire–Rathdown Dún Laoghaire–Ráth an Dúin
- County
- Coat of arms
- Motto: Irish: Ó Chuan go Sliabh, lit. 'From Harbour to Mountain'
- Interactive map of Dún Laoghaire–Rathdown
- Country: Ireland
- Province: Leinster
- Region: Eastern and Midland
- Established: 1994
- County town: Dún Laoghaire

Government
  - Local authority: Dún Laoghaire–Rathdown County Council
  - Dáil constituencies: Dún Laoghaire; Dublin Rathdown
  - EP constituency: Dublin

Area
  - Total: 125.8 km^{2} (48.6 sq mi)
- Highest elevation (Two Rock): 536 m (1,759 ft)

Population (2022)
  - Total: 233,860
  - Density: 1,859/km^{2} (4,815/sq mi)
- Time zone: UTC±0 (WET)
  - Summer (DST): UTC+1 (IST)
- Vehicle index mark code: D
- Website: Official website

Dún Laoghaire–Rathdown (Irish: Dún Laoghaire–Ráth an Dúin) is a county in Ireland. It is in the province of Leinster and the Eastern and Midland Region. It is one of three successor counties to County Dublin, which was disestablished in 1994. It is named after the former borough of Dún Laoghaire and the barony of Rathdown. Dún Laoghaire–Rathdown County Council is the local authority for the county. The population of the county was 233,860 at the time of the 2022 census.

== Geography and subdivisions ==
Dún Laoghaire–Rathdown is bordered to the east by the Irish Sea, to the north by the city of Dublin, to the west by the county of South Dublin, and to the south by County Wicklow. With the city of Dublin, Fingal and South Dublin, it is one of four local government areas in the old County Dublin. Located to the south-east of the capital city of Dublin, the county town of Dún Laoghaire–Rathdown is Dún Laoghaire. Since 2015, the county is part of the Eastern and Midland Region. University College Dublin and Dún Laoghaire Institute of Art, Design and Technology are located in the county.

=== Towns, villages and suburbs ===
- Ballinteer
- Ballybrack
- Ballyogan
- Blackrock
- Booterstown
- Belfield
- Cabinteely
- Carrickmines
- Cherrywood
- Churchtown
- Clonskeagh
- Dalkey
- Deansgrange
- Dundrum
- Dún Laoghaire
- Foxrock
- Goatstown
- Glasthule
- Glenageary
- Glencullen
- Johnstown
- Killiney
- Kilmacud
- Kilternan
- Leopardstown
- Loughlinstown
- Monkstown
- Mount Merrion
- Rathfarnham
- Sandyford
- Sandycove
- Sallynoggin
- Shankill
- Stepaside
- Stillorgan
- Ticknock

== Administrative history ==
In 1986, the administrative county of Dublin was divided into three "electoral counties": Dún Laoghaire–Rathdown, Dublin—Fingal, and Dublin—Belgard. The city has been administered separately from County Dublin since 1548. An "area committee" for the electoral county was formed within Dublin County Council under the Local Government Act 1991,

On 1 January 1994, County Dublin and the Borough of Dún Laoghaire were abolished and the three electoral counties became the administrative counties of Dún Laoghaire–Rathdown, Fingal, and South Dublin respectively. Under the related act, the Local Government (Dublin) Act, 1993, Dún Laoghaire–Rathdown County Council (together with South Dublin County Council and Fingal County Council) became one of the three "successor" councils to Dublin County Council.

The Dún Laoghaire–Rathdown Council area comprises the former Borough of Dún Laoghaire and the south-eastern part of the former County Dublin. Additionally, the powers of the former Deansgrange Joint Burial Board were subsumed into the new authority. From 2002, all "administrative counties" in Ireland were redesignated as "counties". The three counties together with Dublin city constitute the traditional County Dublin.

== Naming ==
The island of Ireland, showing location of Dún Laoghaire–Rathdown.

The coastal town of Dún Laoghaire (called Dunleary until 1821 and then Kingstown until 1920) gave its name to the larger borough of Dún Laoghaire established in 1930. Rathdown was the south-easternmost barony in County Dublin, named after Rathdown Castle. When County Wicklow was created south of County Dublin in 1606, half of Rathdown was transferred to Wicklow, including Rathdown Castle, now a ruin. From the 1840s, the poor law union (PLU) of Rathdown covered all of the Wicklow barony and most of the Dublin barony, with part of Uppercross. From the Dublin and Wicklow sections of the PLU, the Local Government (Ireland) Act 1898 created rural districts respectively named Rathdown No. 1 and Rathdown No. 2, abolished in 1930 and 1925. Rathdown PLU survived as Rathdown Public Assistance District until 1960. Dún Laoghaire and Rathdown was a Dáil constituency created by the Electoral (Amendment) Act 1947 coterminous with the former Rathdown No. 1 rural district.

The name "Dún Laoghaire–Rathdown" was given to the electoral county created in 1985. Before its establishment as an administrative county, possible alternative names before deciding to retain "Dún Laoghaire–Rathdown". The Local Government (Dublin) Act 1993 named it "Dun Laoghaire–Rathdown" in English, omitting the síneadh fada on the "u" of "Dun", and Dún Laoghaire–Ráth an Dúin in Irish. The 1993 act empowered Dún Laoghaire–Rathdown County Council (DLRCC) to apply to change the county's name, but this was not invoked. (Note: Section 9 of the 1993 act was repealed by the Local Government Act 2001 without having been invoked. Since then the default provisions for placename changes apply, requiring a plebiscite of voters rather than a resolution of councillors.)

The spelling in English as "Dun Laoghaire–Rathdown", without the síneadh fada, is used in the list of counties in the Local Government Act 2001 (and as amended by the Local Government Reform Act 2014). However, in the Placenames Database of Ireland and the ministerial order under the Official Languages Act 2003, the name of the county in English is "Dún Laoghaire–Rathdown". This is followed by the County Council, with the síneadh fada used in English. (Note: See for example Annual Reports since 2007)

The placenames order also distinguishes between the use of "County" as a prefix for the traditional counties, but not in the case of "Dún Laoghaire–Rathdown" and other counties listed as "administrative counties".

== Local government and politics ==
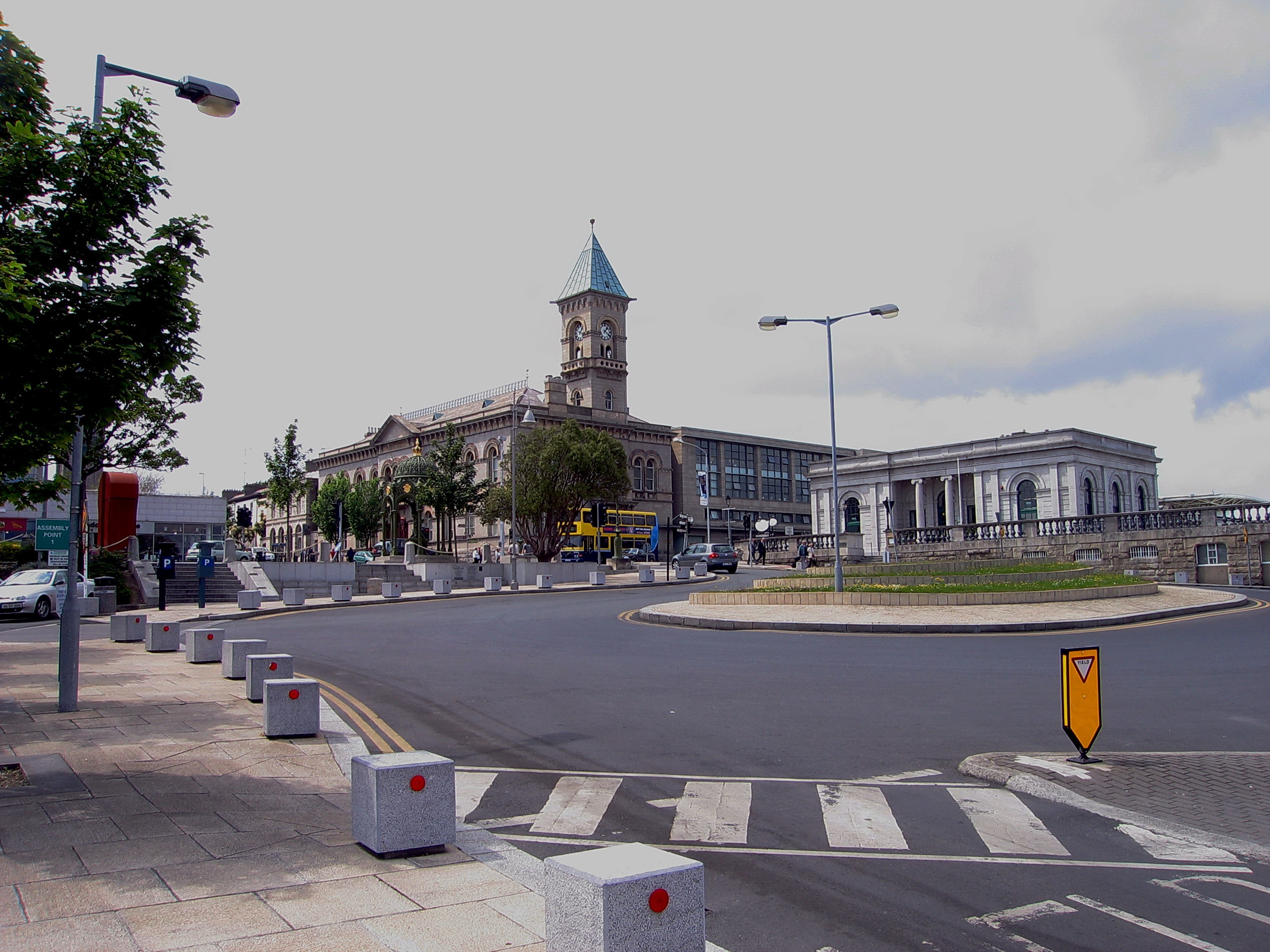
County Hall, Dún Laoghaire

Dún Laoghaire–Rathdown County Council is the local authority for the county. There are six local electoral areas (LEAs) for the county which return a total of 40 councillors as follows: Blackrock (6), Dundrum (7), Dún Laoghaire (7), Glencullen–Sandyford (7), Killiney–Shankill (7), and Stillorgan (6).

For elections to Dáil Éireann, the county is split between the Dáil constituencies of Dún Laoghaire (4 TDs) and Dublin Rathdown (3 TDs), with the division generally running along the N11. These constituencies currently have three Fine Gael TDs, two Green Party TDs, one Fianna Fáil TD and one People Before Profit–Solidarity TD.

It is part of the 4-seat Dublin constituency in European Parliament elections.

== County motto ==
The motto on the insignia of the County Council reads, Ó Chuan go Sliabh, Irish for "From Harbour to Mountain". The crown in the device is that of Lóegaire mac Néill, a legendary 5th-century High King of Ireland and the eponymous Laoghaire of "Dún Laoghaire".

== Demographics ==
Main immigrant groups, 2016
Nationality	Population
United Kingdom	11,927
Poland	3,120
United States	2,181
India	1,919
Philippines	1,325
China	1,223
France	1,178
Spain	1,024
Romania	953
Germany	926

== Transport ==
The Dublin Area Rapid Transit (DART) system runs through the eastern coast of the county and connects to Dublin city centre to the north as well as other points north and south on the Iarnród Éireann railway system, with connections to Intercity and commuter trains. The Luas Green Line runs through the centre of the county.

There is a medium-sized harbour at Dún Laoghaire, with now discontinued ferry crossings to and from Holyhead in North Wales; this was a popular route for tourists travelling across the Irish Sea from Britain. This service was suspended indefinitely in September 2014.
