= Stillorgan =

Suburb of Dublin, in Dún Laoghaire–Rathdown, Ireland

Stillorgan Stigh Lorgan (Irish)
- Suburb
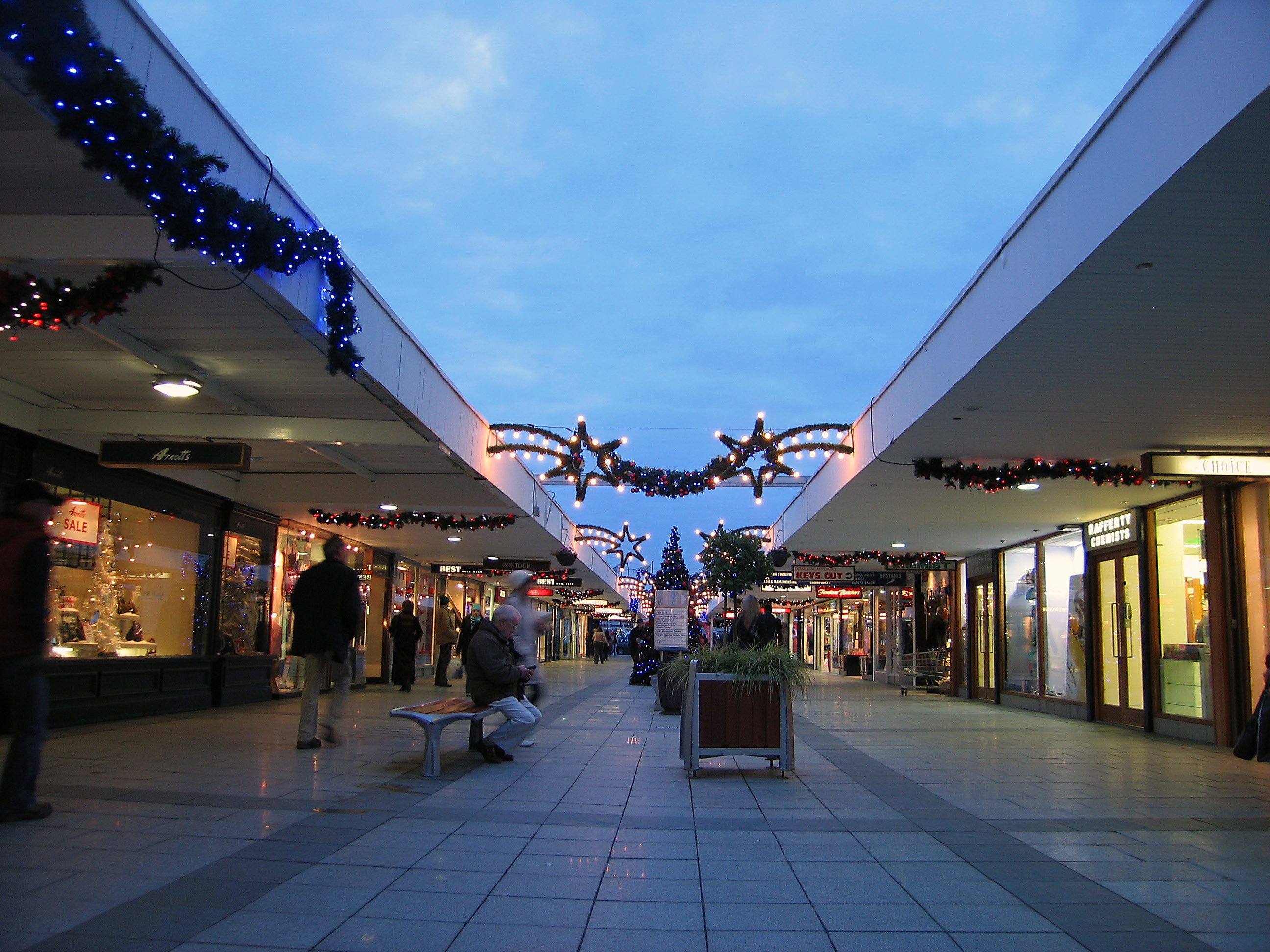
- Stillorgan's shopping centre was the first in Ireland

- Location in Dublin Stillorgan (Ireland)
- Coordinates: 53.2889°N 6.1983°W
- Country: Ireland
- Province: Leinster
- County: County Dublin
- Dáil Éireann: Dún Laoghaire
- Elevation: 58 m (190 ft)

Population (2022)
  - Total: 18,212
- Electoral division
- Eircode routing key: A94
- Area code: 01 (+3531)
- Irish Grid Reference: O192286

Stillorgan (Irish: Stigh Lorgan), formerly a village in its own right, is now a suburb of Dublin in Ireland. Stillorgan is located in Dún Laoghaire–Rathdown, and contains many housing estates, shops and other facilities, with the old village centre still present. Stillorgan is at least partly contiguous with Kilmacud and neighbours other southside districts such as Mount Merrion, Sandyford, Leopardstown, Dundrum, Blackrock, Goatstown and Foxrock.

The population of all electoral divisions labelled as Stillorgan, an area considerably larger than Stillorgan village, was 18,212 at the 2022 census. Stillorgan is in a civil parish of the same name, in the barony of Rathdown.

== Name ==
It is popularly believed that the name Stillorgan is either a Danish or Anglo-Norman corruption of Teach Lorcán, 'the house or church of Lorcán', possibly signifying Saint Lorcán Ua Tuathail. Another belief is that it is named after a Danish or Irish chief of a similar name: what may have been his burial chamber was discovered in Stillorgan Park in 1716. The original Irish name for Stillorgan was Áth na Chill ('Athnakill') – 'Ford of the Church'. In the fourteenth century, the manor of Stillorgan (Stalorgan) was held by the Cruise or Cruys family, from whom it passed to the Derpatrick family, and subsequently to the Fitzwilliams. It was held as leasehold from the English Crown, and in 1389 Sir John Cruys was excused from paying the rent of 40 shillings on the estate.

The local Roman Catholic parish church of St. Laurence is usually presumed to be named after Lorcán Ua Tuathail (whose first name has been traditionally anglicised as Laurence, although the two names are etymologically unrelated). Lorcán, who was born at Diseart Diarmada (Castledermot), County Kildare in 1128, and died at Eu, Normandy, France in 1180, was canonized in 1225 by Pope Honorius. He was one of four sons of an Ua Broin (O'Byrne) princess and Muirchertach Ua Tuathail, King of the Uí Muirdeaigh III.

== Development ==
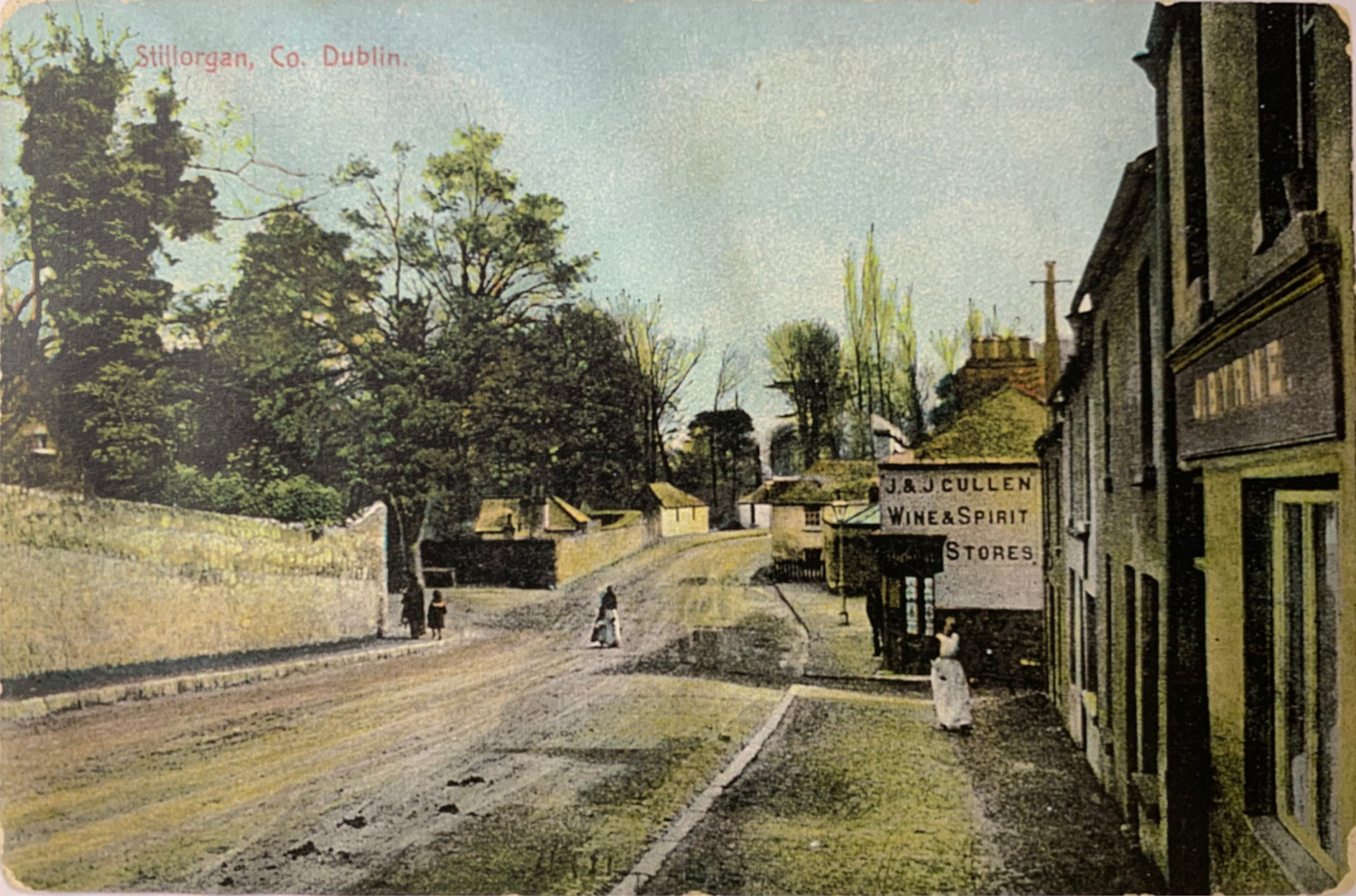
Stillorgan village c. 1905

In the 1930s, 60 houses were built at Beaufield Park. The Merville Estate was subsequently built in the 1950s on land belonging to the Jolly family dairy farm. St Laurence's Park was completed in October 1954.

The first bowling alley in Ireland, the Stillorgan Bowl opened in December 1963 and since 1996 was run under Leisureplex until it was demolished in May 2021.

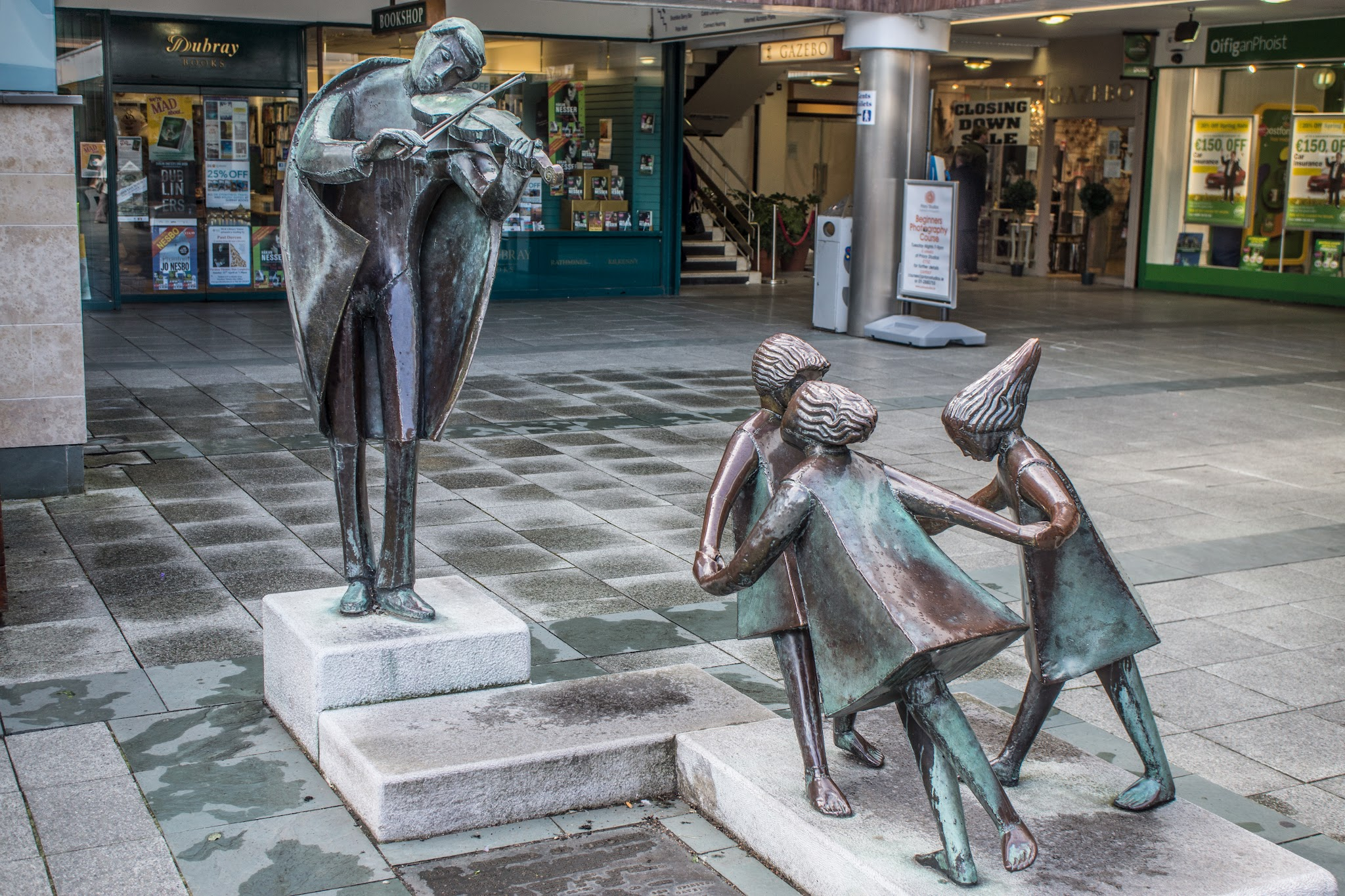
The Fiddler of Dooney sculpture by Imogen Stuart in Stillorgan Shopping Centre

Ireland's first shopping centre was opened in Stillorgan by recently-retired Taoiseach, Seán Lemass, on 1 December 1966. It had three supermarkets, Powers, Liptons and Quinnsworth.

The road in front of the shopping centre was completely lined with cottages built during the early 19th century and, to enable the construction of the centre, they were knocked down. They extended from the Christian Brothers' school Oatlands College to the end of the Dublin Road and up the Lower Kilmacud Road. The rubble was used to fill in and level the lands that are now Páirc De Burca, the playing field of Kilmacud Crokes. Discussions have been ongoing for many years about expanding and updating the centre. It was planned to be redeveloped by Treasury Holdings in 2008. The 'Blakes'/'Burn Nightclub' site has also planning permission for a multi-story apartment complex with some commercial units.

== Places of interest ==
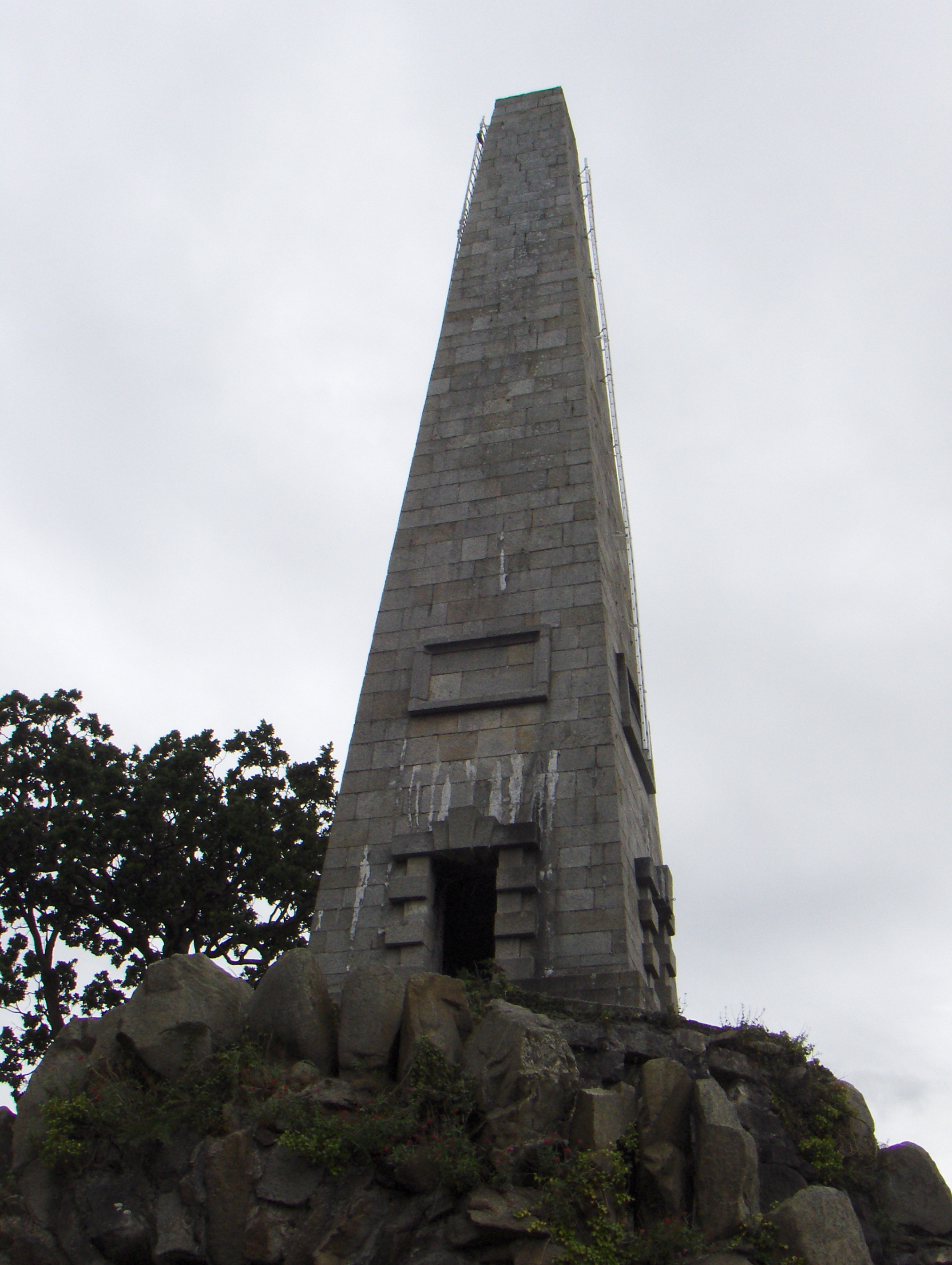
Stillorgan Obelisk

Samuel Lewis' Topographical Dictionary of Ireland (1837) lists a number of "handsome seats and pleasing villas" in the area. These included Stillorgan House (of the Verschoyle family), Carysfort House (home of William Saurin, Attorney General for Ireland), Mount Eagle (later Stillorgan Castle/St John of God Hospital), and several other large residences.

The location of Stillorgan Castle became the House of St John of God when the Hospitaller Order moved there in 1883; it is now a psychiatric hospital. One of the most prominent architectural features is the large 18th-century obelisk designed by Edward Lovett Pearce for the second Viscount Allen; Pearce resided in Stillorgan in a house known as The Grove, which was demolished to make way for Stillorgan Bowl.

The present St. Brigid's Church of Ireland was built in 1706 on the site of an earlier church, thought to have been linked to St. Brigid's Monastery in Kildare.

A large open reservoir, called Stillorgan Reservoir, is situated near the Sandyford Industrial Estate. The water is piped from the Vartry Reservoir near Roundwood in County Wicklow. It was built in the 19th century as part of Dublin Corporation's waterworks on the lands of an 18th-century house called Rockland, later known as Clonmore.

Stillorgan's oldest pub is Bolands, latterly styled Bolands on the Hill. While it was reopened as 'McGowan's' following a change of lease-holder in 2010, it reverted to 'Bolands' in 2012. In its older manifestation it was a local drinking refuge of many South Dublin writers, among them Brian O Nuallain (Myles na gCopaleen) and Maurice Walsh. Henry Darley's brewery was opened in the 1800s and is located near what is now The Grange, Brewery Road. Cullen's was a grocery shop as well as a pub in the 1920s and 1930s. It is now the site of the Stillorgan Orchard which was thatched in the 1980s. It was previously called The Stillorgan Inn.

The first Ormonde Cinema was built and opened in 1954, seating 980 people with a large car park to the side. It was completely demolished in 1978, the site being occupied by the AIB Bank at Stillorgan Plaza. The new Ormonde Cinema opened in the early 1980s as a smaller multi-screen venue. In summer 2011, the Ormonde Cinema was refurbished and opened as a UCI cinema, and later Odeon.

== Education ==
Primary and secondary schools in the area include Oatlands College (boys/Catholic), Mount Anville (girls/Catholic), St. Benildus College (boys/Catholic), St. Brigid's (mixed, Church of Ireland), St. Laurence's (boys/Catholic), and St. Raphaela's School (girls/Catholic). Ireland's first Montessori school "Children's House Montessori School" was created here in 1952 by Veronica Ryan.

Third level institutions in Stillorgan include Stillorgan College of Further Education.

== Sports ==
Stillorgan is home to the Kilmacud Crokes Gaelic Athletic Association club, whose clubhouse and grounds, Glenalbyn, are located directly opposite the shopping centre. It is also home to Stillorgan Rugby Club.

UCD Marian Basketball Club plays most of their underage games in Oatlands College.

== Transport ==
=== Road ===
The N11 road leads out from the city, passing through Stillorgan, towards the major commuter town of Bray. It bypassed Stillorgan's centre since the mid-1970s when the Stillorgan Bypass was opened to the east. The N11 hosts the 'Stillorgan Bus Corridor' (QBC) which runs along the road in both directions from St. Stephen's Green to Foxrock. Stillorgan is a major bus interchange and the Stillorgan QBC is the most heavily used in Ireland, featuring two of Dublin's busiest and most frequent bus routes, the E2 to Dún Laoghaire, the E1 to Bray. Other bus routes serving Stillorgan include the 11, 47 and L25 as well as the peak time-only routes X1, X2, 116 and 118. All of these are operated by Dublin Bus. Go-Ahead Ireland also used to operate the 75 through Stillorgan until 26 November 2023 when it was replaced with the L25. Aircoach provides a direct link to the Dublin Airport via Dublin city centre.

=== Rail ===
The Luas Green line runs on the border of Stillorgan and Sandyford between the reservoir and the Sandyford Industrial Estate over the route of the old Harcourt Street line from Dublin to Bray. Stillorgan is served by two Luas stops, the eponymous Stillorgan Luas stop, and Sandyford; both stops opened with the line in 2004. The Stillorgan stop is approximately 1.4 kilometres (0.87 mi) south-west of the village with park and ride facilities, a commuter bus link to the shopping centre and a journey time to Dublin O'Connell street of about half an hour. Sandyford is situated 450 metres south of Stillorgan with the Luas depot behind it. It was the original terminus of the green line, but the Luas has since been extended away from the course of the old railway line to Brides Glen, though some services still terminate at Sandyford. The earlier Stillorgan railway station was situated to the south of the current Luas depot, past Sandyford stop. It opened on 10 July 1854 following the opening of the Dublin and Wicklow Railway, closed for goods traffic in 1937, and finally closed altogether on 1 January 1959 when CIÉ mothballed the Harcourt Street line. The station building became a private residence and the pumping station near the reservoir is all that survives with it. The nearest railway station today is Blackrock, which a 10-minute drive and 36 minute walk from the village.

A National Transport Authority consultation paper, published in 2018, proposed that the MetroLink would stop alongside Stillorgan's Luas station on its way from Estuary to Sandyford. This was dropped the following year, as it was feared it would disrupt the Luas for a few years, and the updated Metrolink proposal projects a stop at Charlemont instead.

== Representation ==
The Stillorgan Ward is one of six wards in Dún Laoghaire–Rathdown County Council. The Ward includes Clonskeagh, Mount Merrion, Kilmacud, Stillorgan, Leopardstown and Foxrock. The Stillorgan Ward was established with the 1985 Irish local elections, prior to which much of the Stillorgan Ward was part of the Dundrum Ward.

In the 2019 local elections, six councillors were elected to the ward with three representing Fine Gael, one Fianna Fáil, one Green Party and one independent.

== People ==
Notable people who have lived in the Stillorgan area include:

- Veronica Bolay (1941–2020), German-Irish painter, lived in Stillorgan
- James Comyn (1921–1997), English High Court judge, lived in Stillorgan
- Lucy de László (née Guinness; 1870–1950), socialite and diarist.
- Dermot Morgan (1952–1998), the comedian and actor, attended school at Oatlands College and was a teacher at the Stillorgan Tech, now known as the Stillorgan College of Further Education.
- William Orpen (1878–1931), the portrait painter and war artist, was born into an affluent Protestant family in a house called Oriel on Grove Avenue.
- David Sherlock (1814–1884), politician, barrister and Serjeant-at-law, lived at Stillorgan Castle.

== See also ==
- List of towns and villages in Ireland
