= Kilmacud =

Suburb of Dublin, Ireland

Kilmacud Cill Mochuda (Irish)
- Suburb
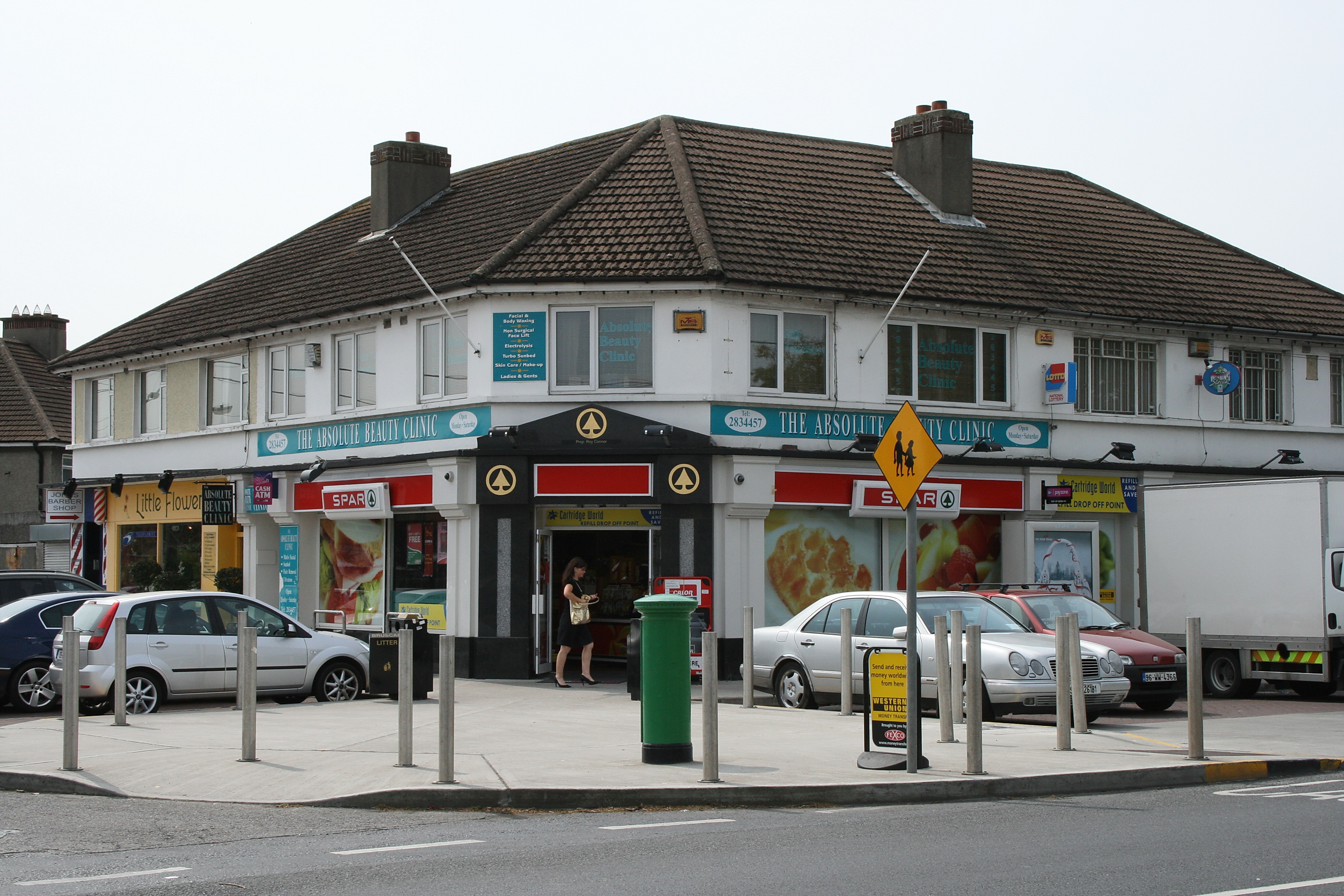
- Local shops on Lower Kilmacud Road

- Location in Ireland
- Coordinates: 53.2863°N 6.2173°W
- Country: Ireland
- Province: Leinster
- County: County Dublin
- Local government area: Dún Laoghaire-Rathdown County Council
- Time zone: UTC+0 (WET)
  - Summer (DST): UTC-1 (IST (WEST))
- Eircode routing key: D14

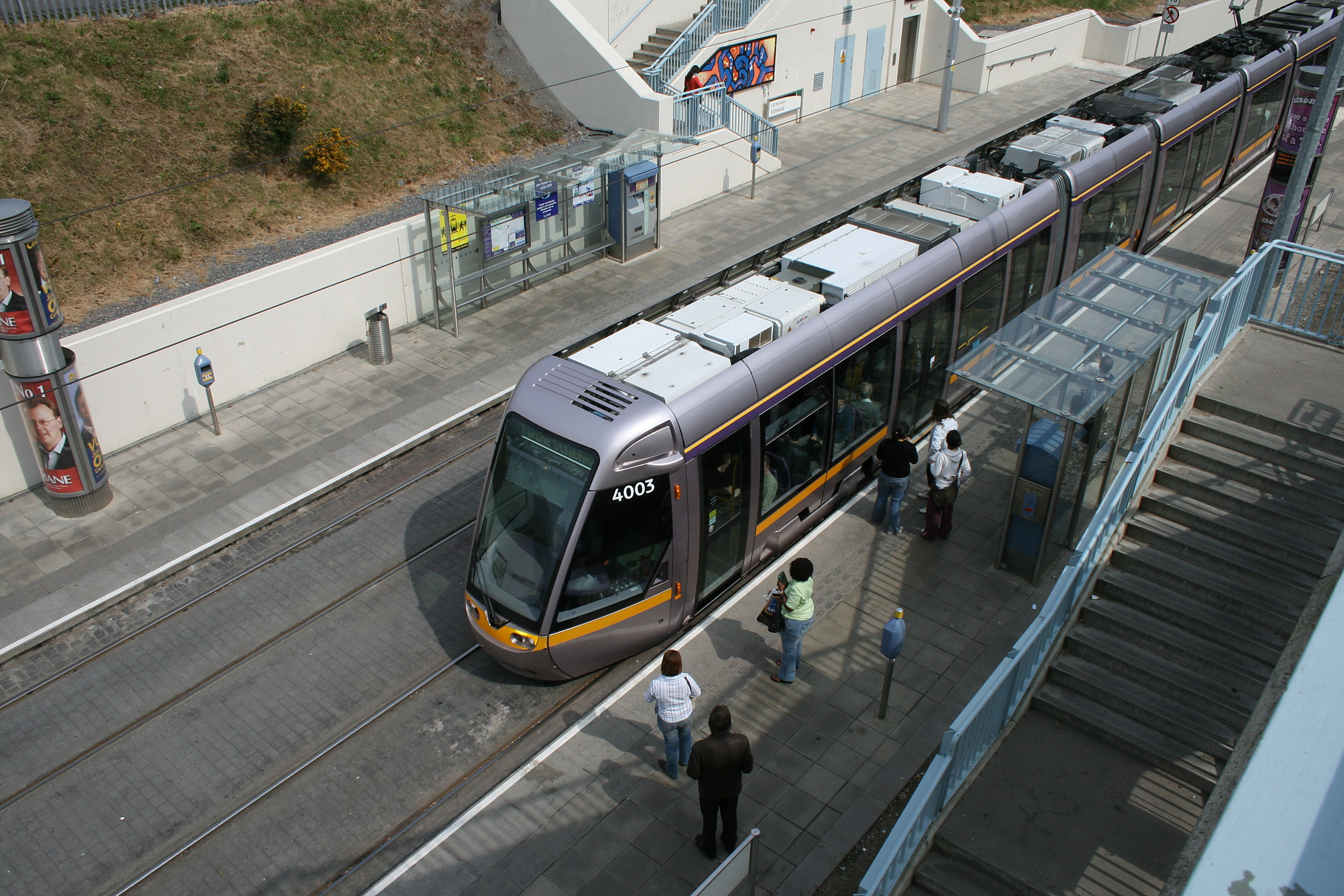
Kilmacud Luas stop

Kilmacud (Irish: Cill Mochuda) is a suburban area of Dublin in Dún Laoghaire–Rathdown, County Dublin, Ireland, at least partly contiguous with Stillorgan. It is in a civil parish of the same name.

== Name ==
Kilmacud is an anglicisation of the Irish name Cill Mochuda, "church of [saint] Mochuda". The identity of the dedicatee Mochuda is uncertain; Mo- is often a hypocoristic prefix. One possibility is Mo Chutu of Lismore. Another is the Welsh–Breton Malo or Mochud, supposedly a companion of Brendan the Navigator. Another suggestion is Cuthbert of Lindisfarne, whose cult could have been brought to Viking Dublin by Norse settlers from the Kingdom of Northumbria. This may be a conflation of Kilmacud with Kilmahuddrick, west of Clondalkin, which the annals of St. Mary's Abbey said is where Cuthbert was born.

== Location ==
Ordnance Survey of Ireland maps show that the civil parish of Kilmacud comprises two townlands, Kilmacud East and West. Civil parishes are almost obsolete in Ireland, as are townland boundaries within urban areas. The surrounding parishes are Taney to the west and north, Stillorgan to the east, Kill to the southeast and Tully to the south.

Kilmacud is north of Sandyford, east of Dundrum and Balally and south of Goatstown and Mount Merrion. The west end of the Lower Kilmacud Road starts in Goatstown, heading in a southerly direction. It then goes southeast through what appears to be a narrow shortcut and on out to the end of Drummartin Road and turns east. From there it continues eastwards through to the Stillorgan dual carriageway or N11. In total, it is about 2.6 kilometres or 1.6 miles long. The Upper Kilmacud Road starts in Dundrum and goes uphill initially it continues eastward, levels off, and continues until a sharp corner brings it northward and downhill. It joins Lower Kilmacud Road close to St. Laurence's Boys School. It is about 2.9 kilometres or 1.8 miles long.

The areas of Kilmacud and Stillorgan are overlapping. For example, Kilmacud Crokes GAA club is located in Stillorgan and Stillorgan's Roman Catholic parish is called Kilmacud. Kilmacud can be described as the area between and immediately around the Upper and Lower Kilmacud Roads. A now-gone placename sign for Stillorgan stood up until the 1970s near Beaufield Park, which is on the section of the Lower Kilmacud Road running between the shops near St. Laurence's Church, and the Stillorgan Shopping Centre. This would have been on the western edge of Stillorgan, and many of the existing housing estates mentioned earlier would not have been in place prior to the 1950s, so it would have marked the beginnings of a built-up area. The area now referred to as Kilmacud would have been on the western side of the sign, with the Chapel of SS Laurence and Cuthbert close by. This was long before the current church was dedicated just to St. Laurence O'Toole, which opened in 1969.

== Education ==
Kilmacud's primary schools are Scoil Lorcán Naofa (St. Laurence's, named for the one-time archbishop of Dublin Laurence O'Toole), St Raphaela's Primary School and Mount Anville National School, the secondary schools are St. Benildus College, Mount Anville Secondary School and St. Raphaela's School.

== Transport ==
The Luas Green Line light-rail system runs south of Kilmacud and has two stops in the area, Stillorgan and Kilmacud, the former being on the edge of the Sandyford Industrial Estate and beside the main reservoir while the Kilmacud stop is south of the grounds of St. Benildus College.

Some early route plans for the planned Dublin Metro, Metrolink, proposed a stop alongside Kilmacud's Luas stop on its way from Swords to Sandyford. However, as of February 2019, it was questioned whether this section of the line would be completed as originally proposed.

== Sport ==
Kilmacud Crokes is a major G.A.A. club whose clubhouse, Glenalbyn is located directly opposite the Stillorgan shopping centre.
