= Ann Derwin =

Irish diplomat

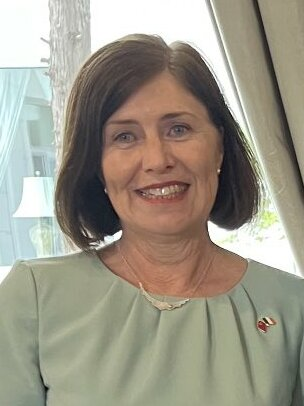

Irish ambassador to the Netherlands
- Incumbent
- Assumed office 2024

Personal details
- Born: Kilmacud, Dublin, Ireland
- Education: University College Dublin (BVetMed); Imperial College London; Queen's University Belfast (PhD)

Ann Derwin is Ireland's ambassador to the Netherlands.

== Education ==
Originally from Kilmacud in Dublin, Derwin graduated from University College Dublin (UCD) with a bachelor's degree in veterinary medicine in 1986. She also holds a master's degree in agricultural economics from Imperial College London (2005) and a doctorate in governance from Queen's University Belfast (2010).

== Career ==
After graduating from UCD, Derwin worked in mixed veterinary practice in Wales before setting up her own small animal practice in County Sligo in Ireland. She joined the Irish Department of Agriculture, Food and the Marine as a veterinary inspector in 1992, and worked in County Donegal for six years.

She was appointed assistant secretary at the department in 2016, with responsibility for corporate affairs including human resource management, finance, and the minister's office. She was the first woman to serve on the management board of the department.

Derwin was the winner of the UCD Alumni Award in Agriculture and Veterinary Science in 2018.

In January 2021, she became the ambassador of Ireland to China with accreditation to Mongolia, having been nominated for this post in July 2020. She left this post in August 2024 and became Irish ambassador to the Netherlands in September.

== See also ==
- Thelma Doran, a previous Irish ambassador to China
