= Zone 3 =

Zone 3 may refer to:

- London fare zone 3, of the Transport for London zonal system
- Hardiness zone 3, a geographically defined zone in which a specific category of plant life is capable of growing
- Zone 3, a literary journal published at Austin Peay State University
- Southeastern Atlanta
- Zone 3 of Milan
- Zone Laser Tag, a Laser Tag game brand.
- "Zone 3", a song by Denzel Currey from the 2013 album Nostalgic 64
