= Leisureplex =

Irish entertainment company

- Type: Private
- Industry: Entertainment
- Predecessor: LeisureCorp
- Founded: 1950s 75–76 years ago
- Founder: Ciarán Butler; Colum Butler
- Number of locations: 4 venues (2026)
- Area served: Republic of Ireland
- Services: Food and drinks; Q-ZAR; bowling; video games
- Parent: Entertainment Enterprises
- Website: leisureplex.ie

Leisureplex is an Irish chain of indoor family entertainment centres ranging from bowling alleys to arcades, Q-ZAR and children's amusement centres. Leisureplex was founded in the 1950s or 1960s by Ciarán Butler and Colum Butler. Leisureplex evolved from a bowling alley called "Stillorgan Bowl" to a wide chain of indoor entertainment centres across Dublin, Ireland.

Although its operations are now entirely limited to Dublin, Leisureplex formerly operated a centre in Cork, known as "Leisureplex Cork," that was opened in the 1980s on the former site of Coliseum Cinema. As of 2026, Leisureplex operates four locations, although Leisureplex Blanchardstown is scheduled to close at an unknown date. Its parent company is Entertainment Enterprises, although the business continues to be managed by the Butler brothers.

== History ==
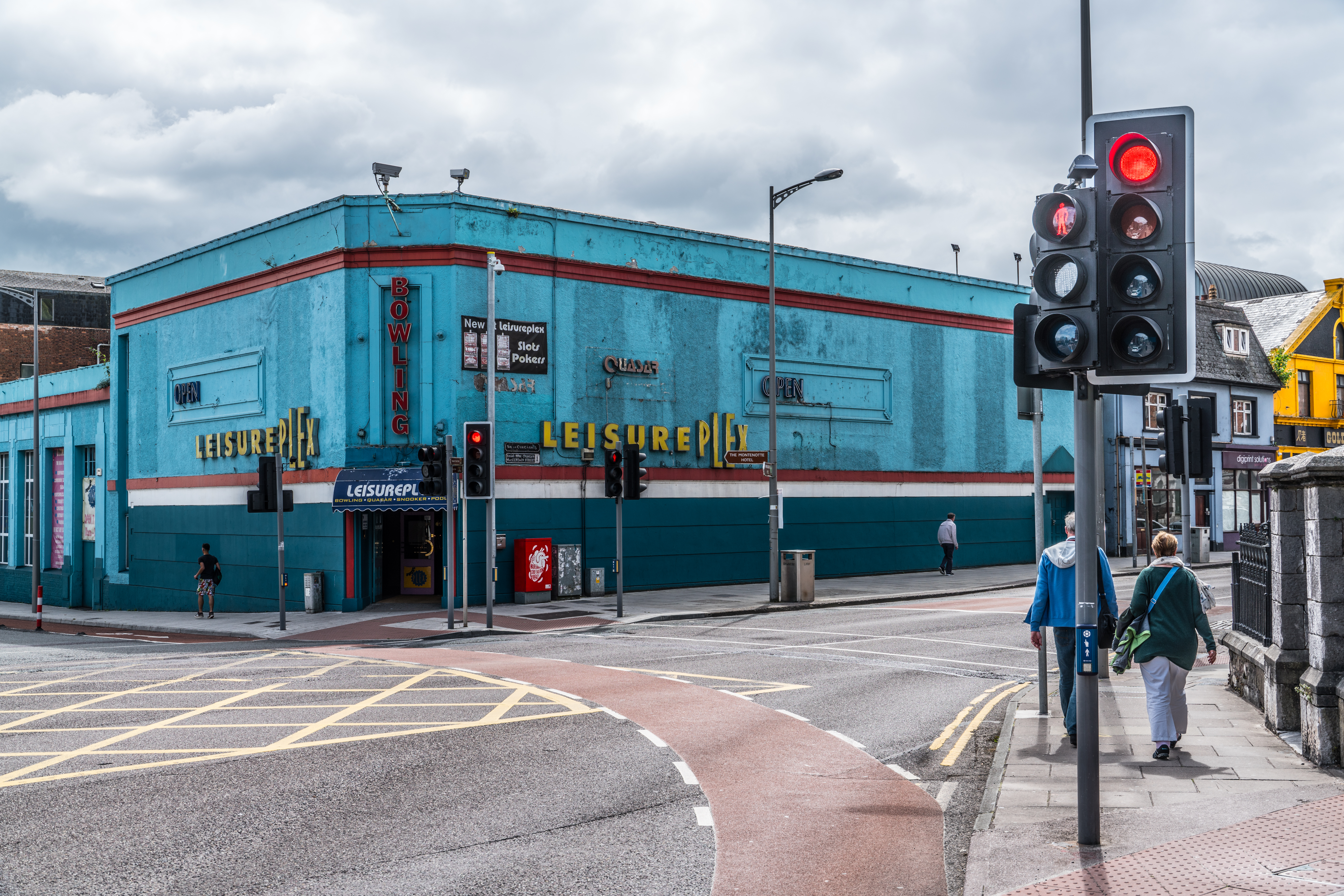
Leisureplex Cork on MacCurtain Street in Cork

Leisureplex was founded by brothers Ciarán and Colum Butler sometime in the 1950s or 60s.

=== Stillorgan Bowl ===
Stillorgan Bowl originally opened in 1963, and decades later the brothers bought it and added it to the Leisureplex chain. It operated as a bowling alley in the suburb of Stillorgan in Dublin and was Ireland's first bowling alley. It became widely known across Dublin, and rock singers like Phil Collins and Bruce Springsteen performed there; it also held events.

The Butler brothers proposed demolishing Stillorgan Bowl since 2004, although it was only acted on in May 2021, and apartment blocks were built on the site. Despite proposing the demolition of Stillorgan Bowl, the Butler brothers fought in court against KW Investments to prevent the demolition. They also refused to vacate the premises so construction could start on the €100 million project of the apartments. Before its shutdown, there was a protest held by St John of God Services to attempt to keep it open, although it was unsuccessful.

=== Leisureplex Cork ===
Leisureplex Cork, also known as Coliseum, was opened in the 1980s on MacCurtain Street in Cork and was built on the former site of Coliseum Cinema. It held several bowling events, most notably the Wigoders Cup 99 National Ladies Tenpin Bowling Finals in 1999. In 2024 it was purchased by Premier Inn, a hotel chain. In October 2026, it was announced that demolition work was going to begin on Leisureplex Cork's site in preparation for Premier Inn's second hotel.

=== Leisureplex Coolock ===
Leisureplex Coolock was opened in 1992 on Malahide Road in Coolock. In 2016, while playing Q-ZAR, a 12-year-old girl suffered a laceration to the face and was paid over €35,000. In 2019 the landlord sold Leisureplex Coolock and the local Odeon Cinemas for over €22 million, in which Savills acted as an agent who was tasked to sell the properties.

=== Leisureplex Blanchardstown ===
Leisureplex Blanchardstown was opened in 1997 in Blanchardstown. On 20 February 2006, a 23-year-old gunman named Darren Larkin entered the Leisureplex with a shotgun and shot 49-year-old security guard Afek Alquasar in the head. Alquasar survived his head injuries, and Larkin was sentenced to life imprisonment. Larkin attempted to appeal his life sentence, although it was partially denied, and his sentence was reduced.

In 2016, Leisureplex was sued after, in December 2011, an employee closed a security door on a seven-year-old autistic boy's hand in Leisureplex Blanchardstown, which caused him to stop communicating. A judge in the Circuit Civil Court refused to approve a settlement of €28,000 in damages. Leisureplex Blanchardstown is set to shut down after Fingal County Council approved plans in early 2026 to turn it into a large retailer. In 2026 the landlord of the Blanchardstown Shopping Centre put taxi ranks in a car park used by the Leisureplex Blanchardstown, which caused a legal battle between the Butler brothers and the landlord; the Butler brothers ultimately won, and the High Court granted that the taxi ranks be removed from the car park.

=== Leisureplex Charlestown ===
Leisureplex Charlestown was opened in 2015 in the Charlestown Shopping Centre and is the newest instalment of the Leisureplex chain. Michael and Tom Bailey, who own the shopping centre, were given €12 million by Nama to develop the Leisureplex alongside the Butler brothers in Finglas.

=== Leisureplex Tallaght ===
The Butler brothers also own a Leisureplex in Tallaght that in 2008 earned €560,000. In 2009, Leisureplex Tallaght got into a planning battle with a rival indoor entertainment centre called Sam's Kids Entertainment Centre; they lodged an appeal to An Bord Pleanála, but they failed to stop the expansion.
