= Sandyford Cricket Club =

Team information
- Founded: 1984
- Home ground: Marlay Park
- Official website: sandyfordcricket.club

Sandyford Cricket Club was founded in 1984 in the Dublin suburb of Sandyford. The club's home ground is located in Marlay Park, a 300-acre public park, approximately 9 kilometres (5.6 mi) from Dublin city centre. The club is a member of the Leinster Cricket Union.

== Teams ==
As of 2024, the club was fielding four adult teams across several divisions. These included the:

- First team, in division 4 league
- Second team, in division 9 league
- Third team, in division 16 league
- Fourth team, in division 18 league.

== Location ==
Sandyford CC is based in Marlay Park in Rathfarnham. As of 2022, this was also the location where the Longitude Festival is held each year. After the 3 concerts and 3 days of Longitude Festival in 2022, the outfield was left in ruins and in a state that was unfit to play cricket.

As of September 2022, Sandyford Cricket Club and Dún Laoghaire–Rathdown County Council were working to move the cricket ground to a new location in keeping with the Marlay Park Master Plan.

== Honours ==
=== League titles ===
- 1st team league titles (7): 1985 (Junior B), 1990 (Junior A), 1995 (Intermediate B), 1996 (Intermediate A), 2002 (Middle A), 2016 (Division 7), 2022 (Division 6).
- 2nd team league titles (5): 1989 (Junior B), 1994 (Junior B), 2006 (Junior A), 2008 (Intermediate B), 2021 (Division 13).
- 3rd team league titles (1): 2008 (Junior B).

=== Cup final victories ===
- 2008 Middle 2 Cup Final: Sandyford I beat Knockharley
- 2008 Whelan Cup Final: Sandyford II beat Rush
- 2022 YMCA Salver Final: Sandyford I beat Balbriggan 2
- 2022 Adamstown Cup Final: Sandyford III beat Kilkenny 3
