= Joe Lynam =

Irish broadcaster

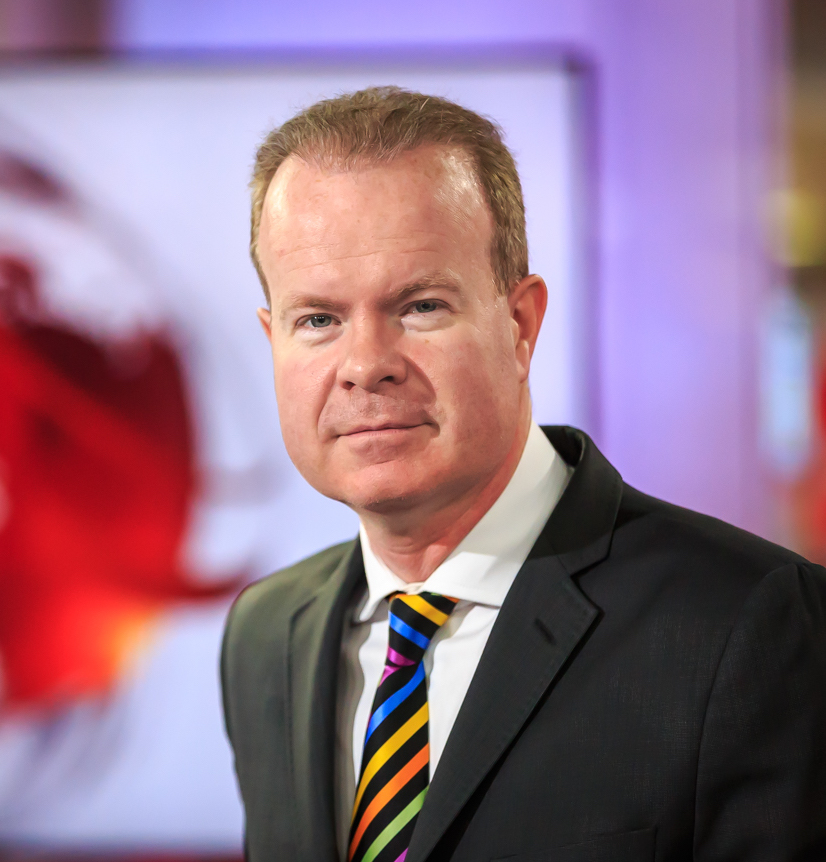
- Born: Joe Bernard Lynam; Dublin, Ireland
- Education: University College Dublin
- Occupations: Journalist, radio and TV presenter
- Employer(s): BBC and Newstalk
- Spouse: Riina Lynam
- Children: 2
- yes Joe Lynam's voice recorded June 2013
- Website: joelynam.com

Joe Bernard Lynam is an Irish broadcaster who is the Business Editor for Irish radio station Newstalk. He also presents the Newsroom on the BBC World Service in the United Kingdom.

He was appointed in January 2022. Lynam is best known a business presenter and correspondent. Before joining Newstalk, he has served as interim business presenter on BBC Radio 4's flagship Today programme. Between 2011 and 2013, he was the business correspondent on BBC Two's Newsnight.

== Overview ==
Between 2008 and 2012, Lynam was the BBC's Weekend Business Correspondent covering economic, business, company, financial and personal finance news on the main BBC One bulletins as well as BBC News, BBC World News, BBC Radio 4, BBC Radio 5 Live and the BBC World Service.

At the height of the European debt crisis 2011–2012, Lynam was business correspondent with Newsnight and travelled to Cyprus, Spain, Belgium, Italy and Ireland to cover the sense of fear in many Eurozone countries.

He was also relief Business Presenter on BBC News and BBC Breakfast.

== Education ==
Lynam went to St Benildus College in Dundrum, Dublin, and went on to study International Commerce at University College Dublin (UCD) in Dublin.

== Broadcasting career ==
Lynam broke the story in August 2006 when a planned terror plot involving a liquid bomb on a UK plane was unearthed.

At the key G20 crisis summit in London in April 2009, Lynam was the first broadcast journalist to reveal live on BBC News with Emily Maitlis that the total amount of money pledged to fix the financial system was going to be $1.1trillion.

Lynam is widely credited with breaking the news that Ireland was in talks with the IMF and EU to get a bailout loan in November 2010. Although this was initially denied by the Irish government, it was proven to be true.

In March 2012, Lynam broke the story that the UK Government was in serious talks with Abu Dhabi with the view to selling it a substantial stake in RBS. This story led to a RBS share prices jumping 5% the following day.

In September 2012, Lynam broadcast a report on Newsnight about alleged mis-selling by several UK based investment banks in Italy and how the UK regulator, the FSA, was made aware of it but failed to act.

In 2016 Lynam and the Money Box programme on Radio 4 were awarded the Wincott award for financial journalism for his work on fraud. He was the first to broadcast fraudsters on the phone in the act of defrauding a woman out of £12,000.

In 2017, he acquired the full highly critical report for the FCA into how RBS 'mistreated its small business customers'. This led to an enquiry by MPs on the Treasury Committee in the House of Commons. In 2018 he was awarded the 'Business Story of the Year' at the Headline Money Awards.

== Personal life ==
Lynam lives in Dublin with his Estonian wife Riina.

His father, also Joe Lynam, died in 2010. Joe senior had been RTÉ's show jumping correspondent in the 1980s. His mother, Christina Lynam, runs a charity Cara Malawi to which he regularly contributes.

In 2010, Lynam helped raise money for the Chiltern Centre for disabled children in Greys Road, Henley-on-Thames, and Power International in High Wycombe.

Before becoming a journalist, Lynam ran a chain of pubs in Germany in the 1990s and speaks fluent German.

Joe Lynam's second son was born in the front seat of his car on the way to the hospital. He attempted to get his wife, who was at the time his girlfriend, to hospital in time; he was not fast enough however – and the little boy Seán was born in his Vauxhall Astra estate on 21 June 2013. The story was widely covered in various media outlets including The Daily Telegraph and the BBC's in house magazine Ariel.
