= St Benildus College =

- Coláiste Naomh Benildus

Location
- Kilmacud, Dublin 14; Ireland; 52.2842°N 7.2217°W

Information
- Motto: "Secundum verbum tuum" (Latin) ("According to thy word")
- Established: 1966
- Principal: Mary Brohan
- Enrollment: c. 880 (2023)
- Religious order: De La Salle
- Website: stbenilduscollege.com

St Benildus College is an all-boys, Catholic secondary school located in Stillorgan, Dublin, Ireland. Established in 1966, the college was named after the De La Salle Saint, Brother Benildus of Clermont-Ferrand, France. As of 2023, there were over 880 students at the school. It is located on the Upper Kilmacud Road in South Dublin on a 25-acre site. The Luas green line runs close to school, and the Kilmacud stop is at the back of the school.

St. Benildus College has been under the trusteeship of the Le Chéile Trust since 2010 but retains its Lasallian ethos. Several De La Salle Brothers reside at St. Benildus monastery on the school grounds.

== Sport ==
Sports undertaken at the school include basketball, Gaelic football, hurling, soccer, chess, rugby, badminton and athletics. The school has won provincial and All-Ireland honours in several of these sports.

In March 2009, a team representing Benildus won their first ever Dublin senior "A" schools title. In 2008/2009, the school's U-16 hurlers won the Dublin "A" division title, and the U-14 hurlers won the "A" division shield. The Benildus team beat Coláiste Éanna on both occasions. In May 2010, in O'Toole Park, Benildus retained their Dublin Senior "A" Football title by beating local rivals Coláiste Eoin. In 2016, St Benildus College won the Leinster school's title in Gaelic football, qualifying them for the 2016 Hogan Cup.

In 1998, the college won the U-16 All Ireland soccer title which qualified them to compete in the World Students Cup in Sardinia in 1999.

The school has had considerable success in chess, with its Under 19 team winning the Senior All-Ireland Championships in 2008 and 2010.

In November 2013, a full-sized astroturf pitch was opened. It consists of one full-sized GAA pitch and two full-sized soccer pitches. The facilities are used by several local amateur sports clubs.

== Notable people ==
=== Alumni ===
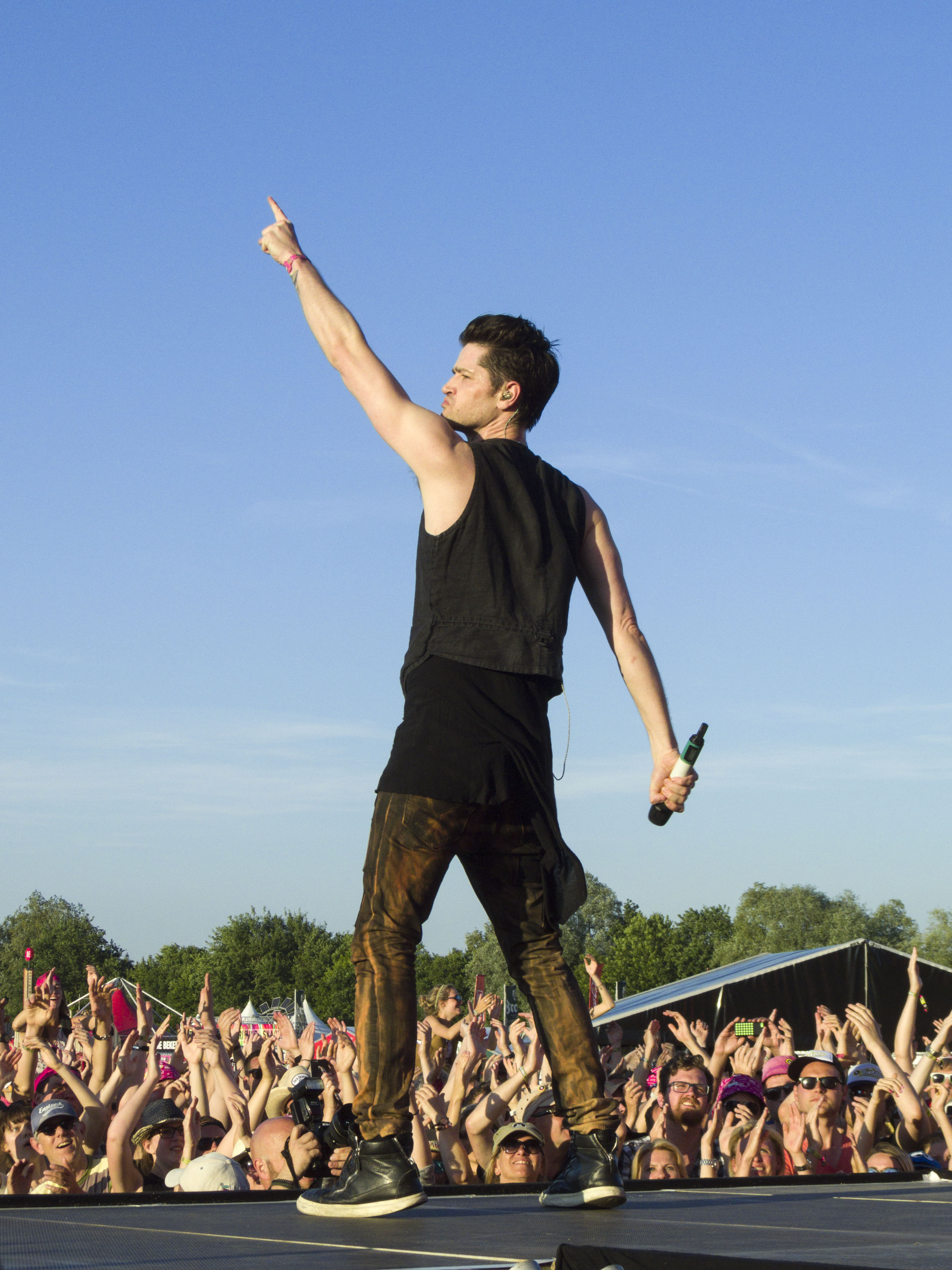
Former Benildus student Danny O'Donoghue, from Dublin band The Script

- Willie Burke; League of Ireland footballer
- David Byrne; Dublin GAA footballer
- Ray Cosgrove; Dublin GAA footballer and former All-Star
- Rory Cowan; actor and entertainer
- Paul Cunningham; RTÉ environment correspondent
- Derek Daly; racing driver
- Danny O'Donoghue; singer-songwriter with Irish band The Script
- Diarmaid Ferriter; historian and author.
- David Gillick; twice European indoor athletics gold medalist.
- James Keddy; League of Ireland footballer
- David Kitt; singer-songwriter
- Joe Lynam; BBC presenter
- Paul Mannion; Dublin GAA footballer
- Daniel McConnell; editor Business Post
- Padraic McMahon; of Irish band The Thrills
- Maurice Pratt; businessman
- Richard Sadlier; former Ireland international soccer player
- Philip F. Tyler, actor and television presenter
- Éamon Zayed; Libyan international footballer

=== Staff ===
- Aidan Fennelly; Laois footballer
- Austin O'Malley; Mayo footballer
- Cormac McAnallen; Tyrone football captain
- Walter Walsh; Kilkenny hurler
- Noel McGrath; Tipperary hurler
- Darragh Fives; Waterford hurler
