= Thelma Doran =

Irish diplomat

Thelma Maria Doran was the Irish Ambassador to China from November 1991 until November 1995. While in China, she was the non-resident Ambassador to Pakistan and the Philippines. She became Ambassador to Poland in September 2001 (with concurrent accreditation to Lithuania and Latvia). She served as Ambassador to Norway from 8 September 2005 until 14 January 2008.

She has also served as Ambassador to Austria, Permanent Representative of Ireland to the United Nations, and non-resident Ambassador to the Slovak Republic and the Republic of Slovenia.

Doran graduated from University College Dublin (UCD) with a BA in 1965 and a H Dip in Education the following year. She taught for five years teaching before joining the Department of Foreign Affairs.
