= Zone Laser Tag =

Australian laser tag brand

- Company type: Private
- Industry: Laser tag equipment, Entertainment
- Founded: 1987
- Founders: Patrick Holmes, Frank Stace
- Headquarters: Melbourne, Australia
- Products: Laser tag systems, vests, phasers
- Website: lasertag.com

Zone Laser Tag is an Australian-based laser tag manufacturer founded in 1987 in Melbourne, Australia. The company designs and supplies laser tag equipment to entertainment venues globally. As of late 2025, the company maintains over 1,100 active installations worldwide across 60 countries.

== History ==
The company's origins date to May 1988 with the founding of Phasor Strike by Patrick Holmes and Frank Stace at "The Fun Factory" in South Yarra, Melbourne. The initial Phasor Strike hardware served as the "Version 1" and "Version 2" iterations of the system before the brand was formally consolidated as Zone Laser Tag in May 1989.

The company's early development occurred during an era of significant growth for Australian commercial laser tag, alongside domestic competitors such as Q-ZAR and Laserforce. During the 1990s and 2000s, the company expanded its global footprint through the acquisition of international entities, including Canada-based Darkzone Technologies and Crystal Entertainment.

== Technology ==
Zone Laser Tag systems have transitioned from basic infra-red equipment to data-integrated platforms. Notable system generations include:

- Nexus (2003–2015): A long-running system that was among the first to integrate venue point-of-sale (POS) functionality directly into the player vests and arena hardware.
- Helios Platform (2014–present): The current flagship platform, which utilizes web-based "O-Zone" software for real-time venue management. Modern iterations like Helios3 include HD color touchscreens on player vests, proximity sensors to prevent physical contact, and fitness tracking metrics such as calorie expenditure.

== Global presence ==
As of 2026, the company operates 20 regional offices and provides hardware for approximately 50% of new laser tag venue builds globally. The company's expansion is supported by strategic regional partnerships:

- United States: Zone America is headquartered in Fort Worth, Texas and serves as the primary hub for North American operations.
- United Kingdom and Ireland: The brand is represented by Zone Leisure Technology based in Leicester, supporting various independent sites and local franchises.
- Europe: Regional distribution is managed through dedicated partners, including Leisure Technologies in France and Megazone Oslo for Scandinavia, covering Norway, Denmark, Sweden, and Iceland.
- Strategic Alliances: The company serves as a regional partner for location-based brands such as Hologate and serves as the exclusive distributor for Prison Island interactive challenge rooms in the APAC region.

== Australia and New Zealand ==
In its domestic market, Zone Laser Tag technology powers several distinct venue identities and independent networks.

- Zone 3: A network of arenas utilizing Zone equipment since the early 1990s, with long-running venues in Canberra, Hobart, and Darwin.
- Darkzone: Multiple high-capacity arenas, notably in Melbourne, that explicitly utilize Helios technology for both casual play and professional leagues.
- Megazone: A brand active in both Australia and New Zealand that supports competitive play and professional laser sporting events using the Zone platform.

The brand also hosts the annual Australasian Zone Laser Tag Championship, a regional competitive event that has been held since 1999 across locations like Box Hill, Hobart, and Canberra.

== Awards and recognition ==
In 2025, Zone Laser Tag received two major industry awards that confirmed its status as a market leader:

- IAAPA Brass Ring Award (2025): Won First Place for "Best Exhibit" (36-45 square meters) at IAAPA Expo Europe in Barcelona. The Brass Ring is considered the highest honor in the global attractions industry.
- Association of Indoor Play Awards (2025): Named "Best Trade Supplier" by the AIP for innovation and excellence in the indoor entertainment sector.

== See also ==
- Q-ZAR
- Laser tag
