= Sandyford =

Outer suburb of Dublin, Ireland

Sandyford Áth an Ghainimh (Irish)
- Suburb
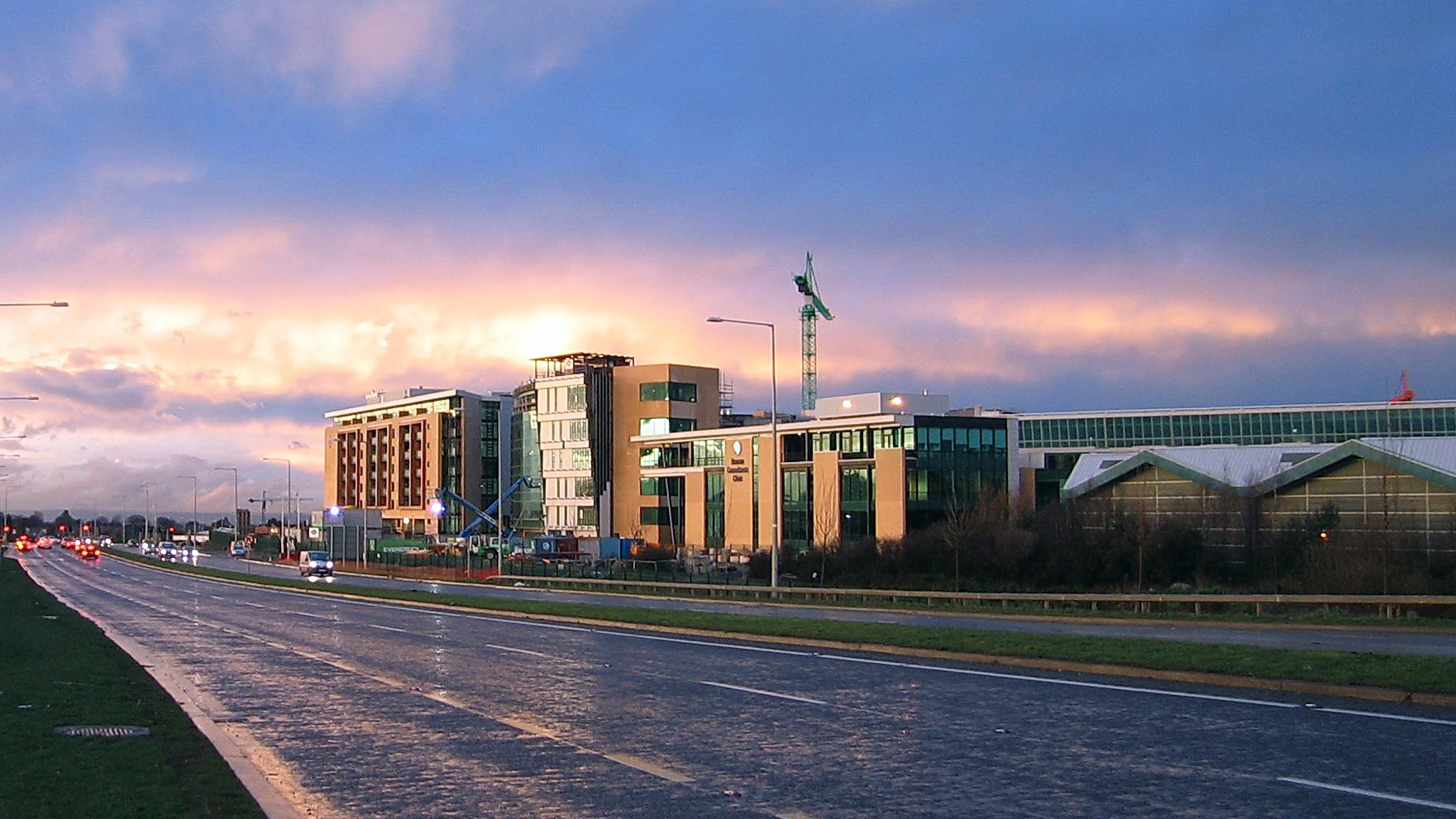
- Commercial buildings in Sandyford east of the R133 road

- Location in Dublin Sandyford (Ireland)
- Coordinates: 53.27°N 6.225°W
- Country: Ireland
- Province: Leinster
- County: County Dublin
- Local authority: Dún Laoghaire–Rathdown
- Elevation: 105 m (344 ft)

Population (2016)
  - Urban: 7,688
- Time zone: UTC±0 (WET)
  - Summer (DST): UTC+1 (IST)
- Eircode routing key: D18
- Area code: 01 (+3531)
- Irish Grid Reference: O183263

Sandyford (Irish: Áth an Ghainimh) is an outer suburb of Dublin, Ireland. It is within the administrative area of Dún Laoghaire–Rathdown County Council, within the traditional County Dublin.

Sandyford Business District makes up much of the suburb and encompasses 4 business parks: Sandyford Business Park, Stillorgan Business Park, Central Park and South County Business Park. Some of the multinational companies based in the area include Google, Facebook, Microsoft and AIB.

== Location and access ==
Sandyford is part of the Dáil Éireann constituency of Dublin-Rathdown. Sandyford village (sometimes referred to in Irish as Taobh na Coille, meaning 'woodside', the townland in which it is situated) is 9 km south of Dublin city centre, just south of the M50 motorway, accessed from the R117 road or M50 junctions 13 and 14, while Sandyford Business District is just north of the motorway.

An Aircoach service links the area with Dublin Airport 24 hours a day. Dublin Bus routes 11, 44, 44B, 47, 116 and 118 link the area to other parts of the city. Go-Ahead Ireland also used to operate the 75 through Sandyford until 26 November 2023 when it was replaced with the S8.

=== Luas ===
The Luas Green Line was built through the Business District and the Kilmacud, Stillorgan, Sandyford and Central Park stops serve the area, the middle two lying along the eastern edge of the original district. All four of these stops are in the Sandyford Business District. Sandyford was the Green Line terminus until the extension to Cherrywood opened in October 2010. The depot for the Green Line is located on the eastern edge of the Business District.

=== Metrolink ===
While a 2018 public consultation document proposed that the MetroLink project could have its southern terminus at Sandyford, by February 2019 it was proposed that the line would not serve Sandyford and instead stop at Charlemont.

== History ==
Sandyford House, a pub in the centre of the village, has been an inn and coach house since the 1690s. For 200 years it was a stopping place for travellers en route to Enniskerry. From 1803 onwards, the Chatham Street to Enniskerry mail coach (a two-hour journey) stopped and deposited the region's mail at the inn, which acted as the local post office.

== Sandyford Business District ==
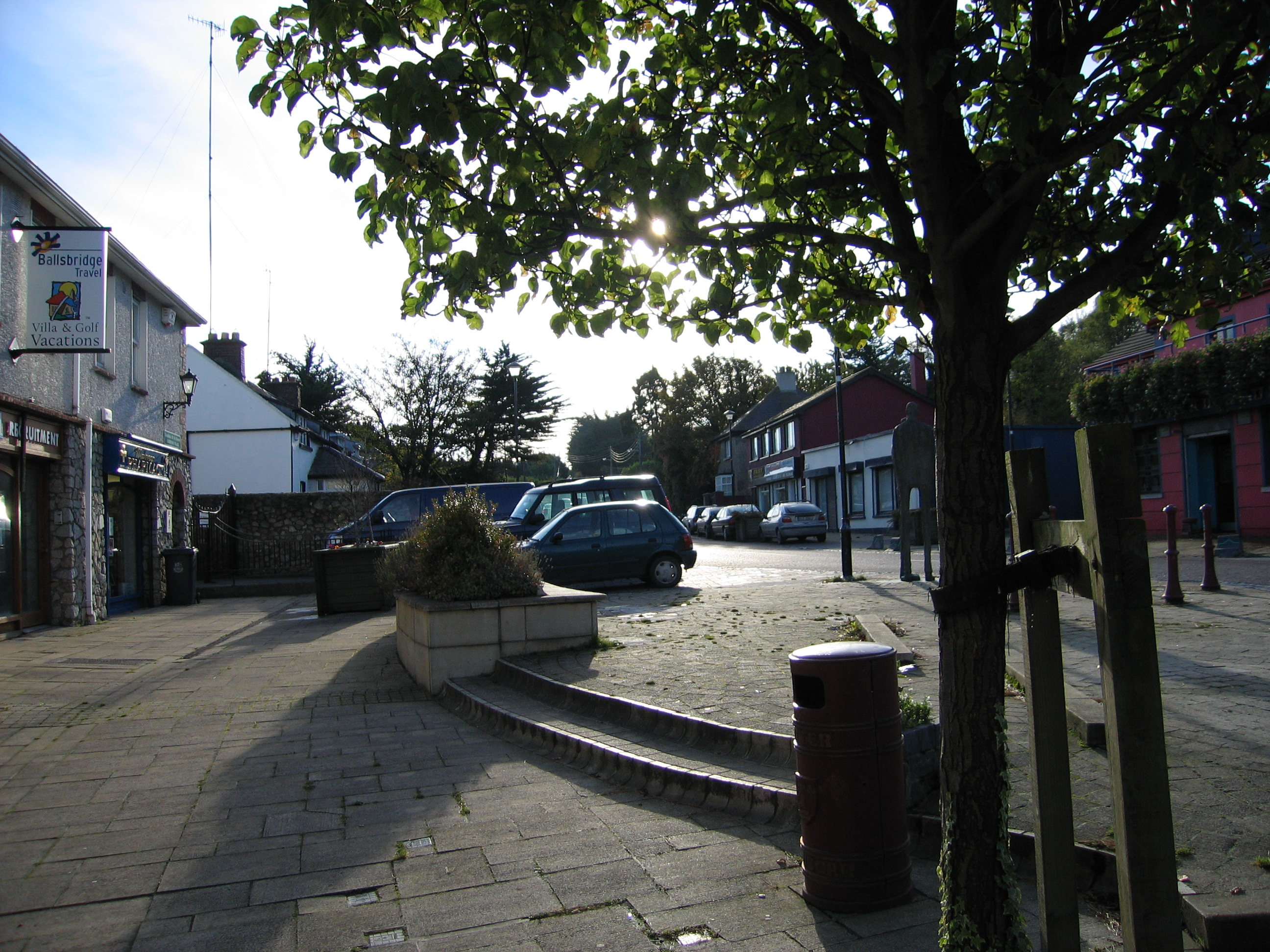
Sandyford Village

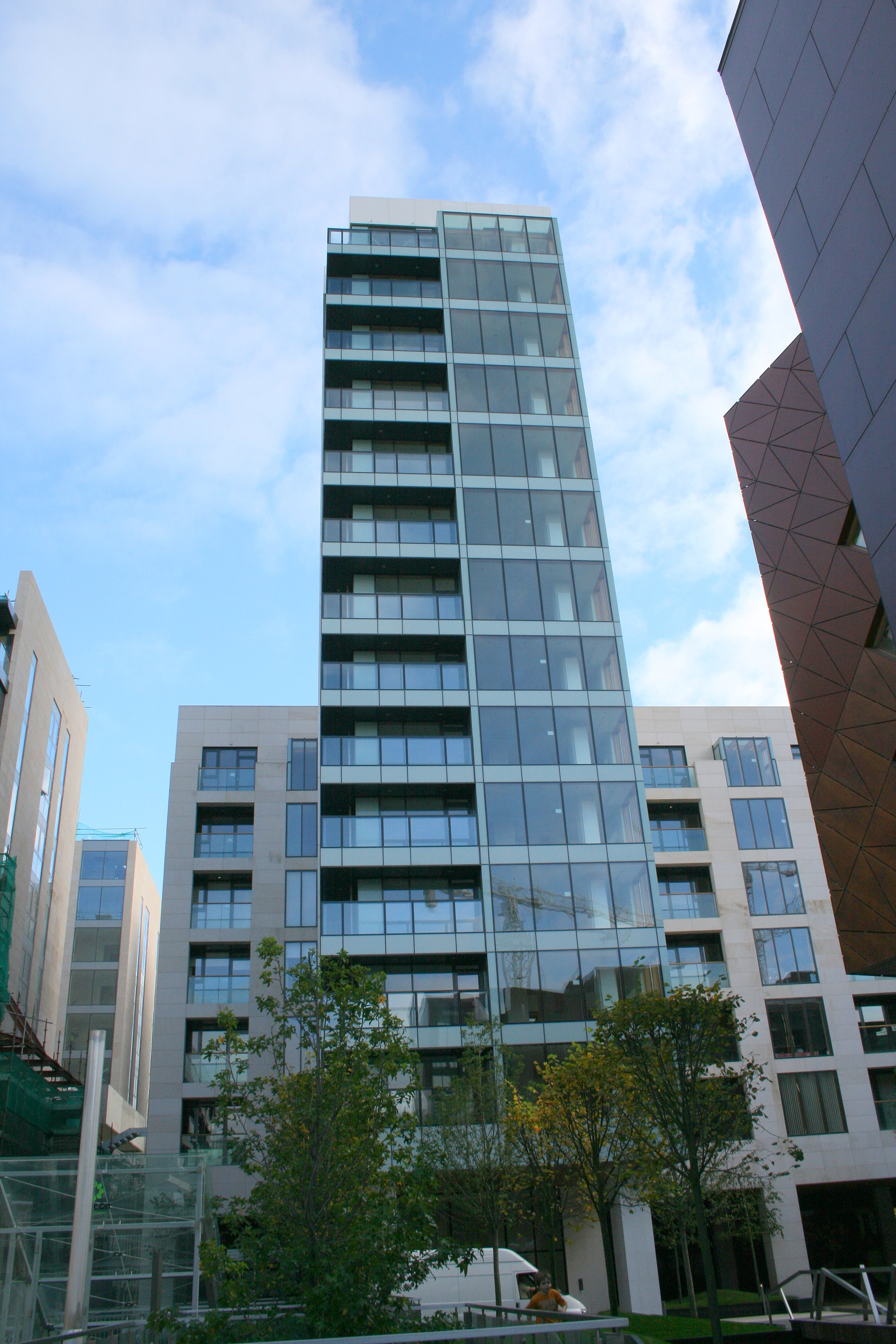
Beacon Tower, at 15 storeys was briefly the tallest building in Dún Laoghaire–Rathdown

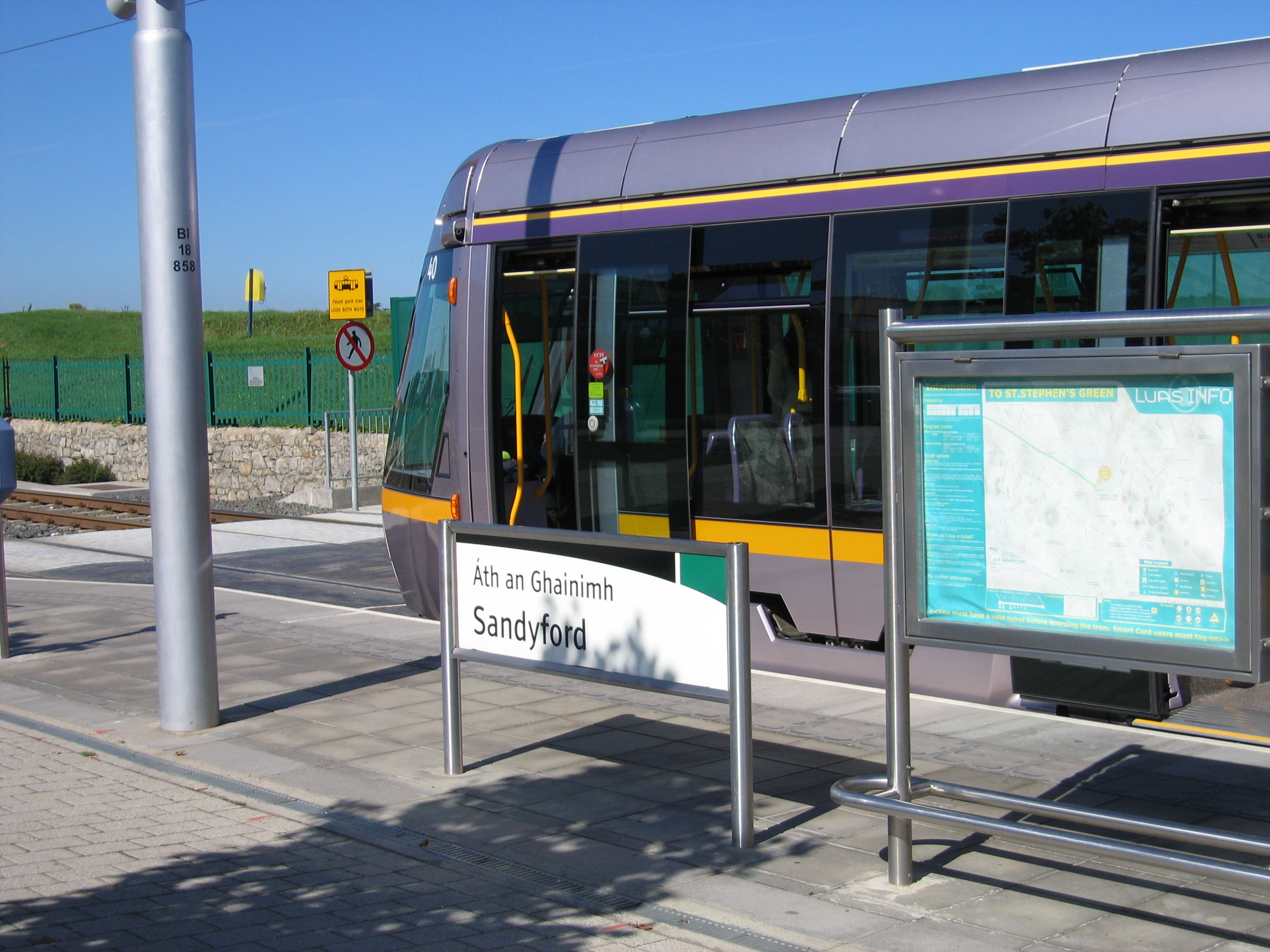
Luas at its Sandyford stop.

Sandyford Business District is a large business park consisting of more than 700 companies employing over 20,000 people. It was officially opened in 1977 on a site of 120 acres and for 50 years was known as the "Sandyford Industrial Estate"; 85 acres allocated to light industry and the rest to offices.

The area includes several separate business parks and sites, including Sandyford Business Park, Stillorgan Business Park, Central Park, and South County Business Park.

A proposal to establish a Sandyford Business District area, to include the core Sandyford Business Park as well as the other areas, resulted in the establishment of the Sandyford Business Improvement District Company (SBID) in January 2017. The area has capacity for 17,500 more employees, 350,000 sq m of commercial floor space and 1,000 residential units.

Companies in the business district include American Airlines, Barclaycard, Canon, Microsoft, Novell, and Vodafone Ireland.

The Irish Management Institute, the Irish Mint, and the Beacon Hospital are also located in the Sandyford area.

== People ==
Notable residents of Sandyford include radio personality Ray D'Arcy, singer/songwriter Paul Brady, and comedian Hal Roach (1927–2012), while David Kennedy, the former Formula 1 driver and commentator lived for many years on Sandyford Road. Other residents have included:

- Frank Aiken, a founder member of Fianna Fáil, lived in Sandyford, and a local housing development called Aiken's Village is built on what was his land.
- Máire Comerford, Republican activist, lived at her home, St. Nessan's, in Sandyford from 1935 to 1982.
- Christopher Ewart-Biggs, the British Ambassador to Ireland, was killed by the IRA on Murphystown Road in Sandyford while leaving his residence, Glencairn House, on 21 July 1976.

== Sports ==
Sandyford is home to the Meteors Ladies' Basketball Club. The club was founded in 1965 and celebrated its 50th anniversary in 2016.

Naomh Olaf Gaelic Athletic Association Club is located in Sandyford. Founded in 1981, the club has teams from under eight up to senior level, and operates an academy for boys and girls from four through seven years of age.

Sandyford Cricket Club was founded in 1984.

== Arts and culture ==
In the centre of Sandyford village is a monument to the working men of the village, Pater and Ned.

From series 3 onwards, children's TV series ROY was produced in Sandyford.

== See also ==
- List of towns and villages in Ireland.
