= List of ambassadors of Ireland to China =

Ambassador of Ireland to the People's Republic of China
- Coat of Arms of Ireland
- Incumbent; Dr. Nicholas O’Brien since August 2024
- Style: His Excellency
- Inaugural holder: John H. F. Campbell
- Formation: John Campbell
- Website: Embassy of Ireland, China

The Ambassador of Ireland to the People's Republic of China is the official representative of the Government of Ireland to the Government of the People's Republic of China and the head of the Embassy of Ireland, Beijing.

== History ==
Ireland established diplomatic relations with China in 1979 and opened its embassy in Beijing in May 1980.

== List of representatives ==
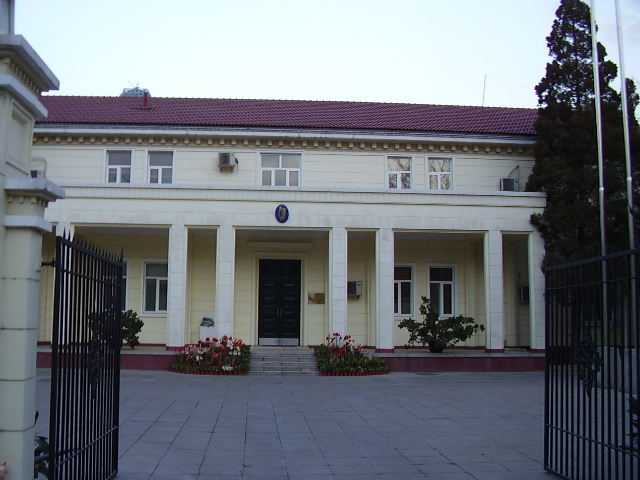
Embassy of Ireland, Beijing

- 1980–1983: John H. F. Campbell
- 1983–1987: Dermot Waldron
- 1987–1991: Gearoid O'Broin
- 1991–1995: Thelma Doran
- 1995–1999: Joe Hayes
- 1999–2004: Declan Connolly
- 2004–2013: Declan Kelleher
- 2013–2017: Paul Kavanagh
- 2017–2020: Eoin O'Leary
- 2021–2024: Ann Derwin
- 2024-present: Dr. Nicholas O’Brien
