= Kilmacud Luas stop =

Tram stop in Dublin, Ireland

Kilmacud Cill Mochuda
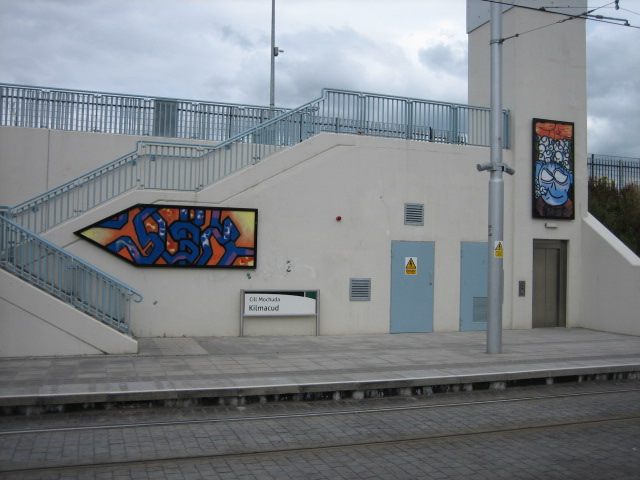
- The southbound platform, with some decorative paintings.

General information
- Location: Benildus Avenue/Drummartin Link Road; Kilmacud, County Dublin; Ireland
- Coordinates: 53°16′59″N 6°13′26″W
- Owner: Transport Infrastructure Ireland
- Operator: Transdev (as Luas)
- Line: Green
- Platforms: 2

Construction
- Structure type: In cutting
- Accessible: Yes

Other information
- Fare zone: Green 3

Key dates
- 30 June 2004: Stop opened
- 2018: Platforms extended
Location
- Location within Dublin

Kilmacud (Irish: Cill Mochuda) is a stop on the Luas light-rail tram system in Dún Laoghaire–Rathdown, County Dublin, Ireland. It opened in 2004 as a stop on the Green Line and serves the eponymous suburb. The stop is located at the junction between Benildus Avenue and Drummartin Link Road.

== Location and access ==
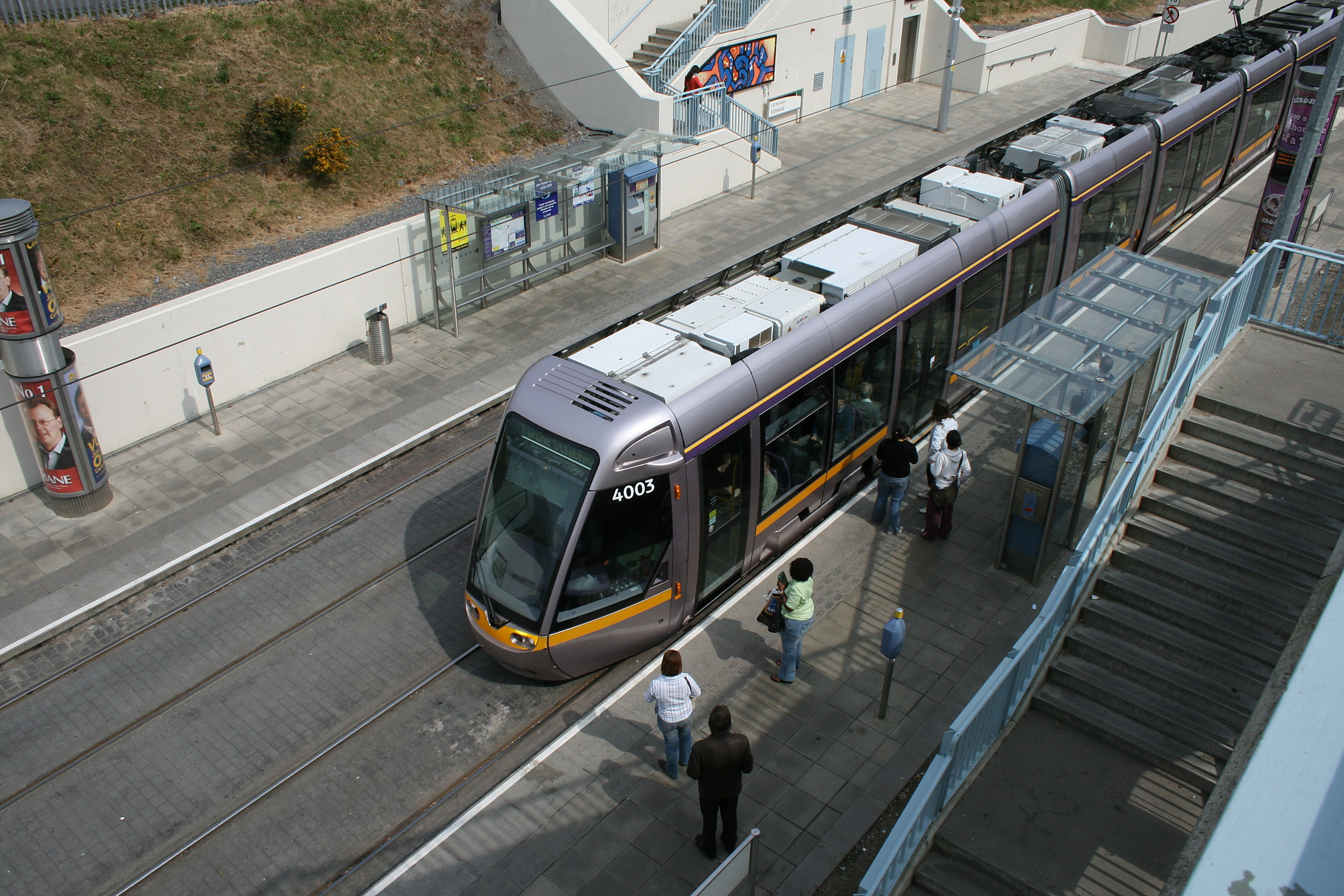
A tram calling at Kilmacud on its way to St. Stephen's Green

The track around Kilmacud runs in a broad cutting between Benildus Avenue and the grounds of St Benildus College. A footbridge provides access across the tracks, avoiding the stop completely. The stop has entrances on both sides, leading from the northbound platform to Benildus Avenue, and from the southbound platform to a footpath in the college (which ultimately leads to Drummartin link road). Both entrances consist of a staircase and lift to provide step-free access. The Benildus Avenue entrance then has a bridge over the side of the cutting, leading to a gap in the retaining wall. At the road junction, the Luas stop is identified with a solar-powered totem of the same design to one seen at Carrickmines.

== Services ==
Trams stop at the stop coming from either end every 2-10 minutes.

Preceding station	Luas	Following station
Balally towards Parnell or Broombridge	Green Line	Stillorgan towards Sandyford or Brides Glen
