= St. Raphaela's School =

St. Raphaelas

Location
- Stillorgan, County Dublin; Republic of Ireland
- Coordinates: 53.282717°N 6.206133°W

Information
- Motto: ad finem fidelis
- Established: 1971
- Principal: Denise O’Dowd vice principal = Cathy Behan
- Enrollment: Primary 313 Secondary 600
- Website: straphaelas.ie

St. Raphaelas is an all-girls primary school and secondary school located in Stillorgan, County Dublin and run by the Handmaids of the Sacred Heart of Jesus. The schools are named after Saint Raphaela.

== History ==
Saint Raphaela's campus is founded on the original residence for the Pilkington Family called Wesbury House, who were notable glassmakers. They later sold their house to the Devlin family who in the 1940s passed it to the Daughters of Charity.

The Daughters of Charity founded a boarding school and called the primary school called St. Philomena's and the secondary school called Marillac.

In 1971 the Daughters of Charity decided to leave the schools to focus on children with special needs. The Archbishop of Dublin at the time, John Charles McQuaid, invited the Handmaids of the Sacred Heart of Jesus to take over the running of the schools.

In 1977 the schools were renamed St. Raphaela's to mark the canonisation of Saint Rafaela Maria of the Sacred Heart (born 1850 - died 1925), the founder of the order of Handmaids of the Sacred Heart.

The current Secondary School building was opened in 1986, followed by a new wing in the 1990s.

An Astroturf sports pitch was added in 2006.

== Sports ==
The school partakes in the following sporting competitions:

- Leinster hockey competitions.
- The badminton schools league.
- The basketball SSA league.
- The Gaelic football junior league.
- The Leinster school soccer league

== Other facilities ==
The campus of St. Raphaelas also has some extra facilities

- Greenfields Montessori School.
- Naíonrá an Irish speaking playschool.
- A day centre for St. Michael's House, an organisation that provides services for children and adults with an intellectual disability.
