= Stillorgan Luas stop =

Tram stop in Dublin, Ireland

Stillorgan Stigh Lorgan
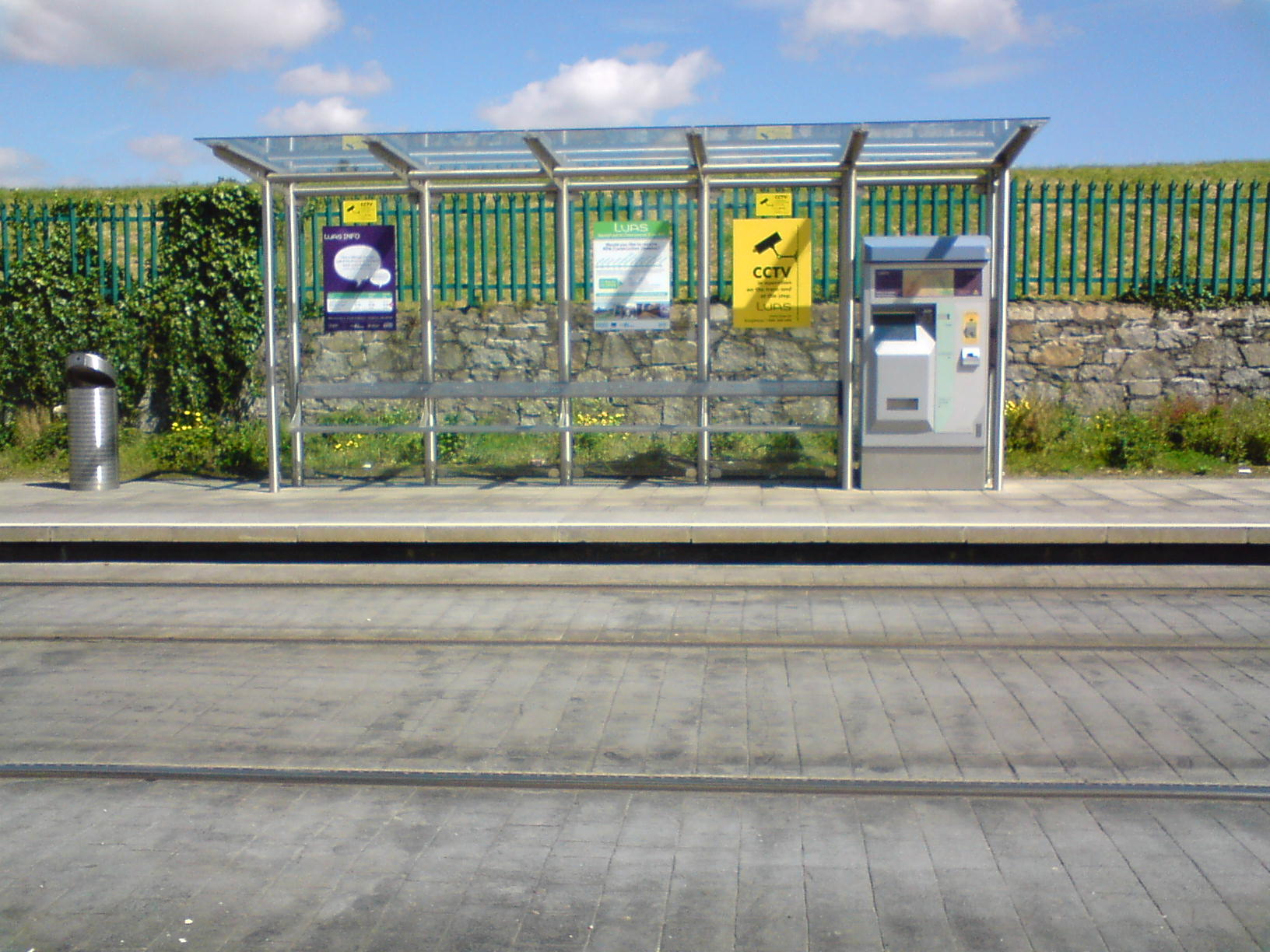
- The southbound platform and retaining wall of Stillorgan

General information
- Location: Blackthorn Avenue; Stillorgan/Sandyford, County Dublin; Ireland
- Coordinates: 53°16′46″N 6°12′36″W
- Owner: Transport Infrastructure Ireland
- Operator: Transdev (as Luas)
- Line: Green
- Platforms: 2
- Bus routes: 3
- Bus operators: Dublin Bus
- Connections: 11; 47; 116

Construction
- Structure type: At-grade

Other information
- Fare zone: Green 3

Key dates
- 30 June 2004: Stop opened
- 2018: Platforms extended
Location
- Location within Dublin

Stillorgan (Irish: Stigh Lorgan) is a stop on the Luas Green Line serving Sandyford and Stillorgan in Dún Laoghaire–Rathdown, Ireland. The stop is located between Blackthorn Avenue and the Stillorgan reservoir, at the intersection with St. Raphaela's Road and serves the suburban area of Stillorgan. The stop is 450m up the line from Sandyford Luas stop, which was itself built on the site of an old railway station called Stillorgan.

== Location and access ==
Both of the stop's edge platforms can be accessed from either of the adjacent roads, and the stop is of the modular design common to many of the stops on the original route of the Luas. A park and Ride facility with 341 spaces is shared by Stillorgan and Sandyford Luas stops. To the south of the stop, the tram line slopes continues along the old railway alignment, alongside the reservoir to Sandyford. To the north, it crosses the road and continues to Kilmacud.

== Onward transport ==
The stop is served by Dublin Bus routes 11, 47, and 116 providing connections to Stepaside, Belarmine and Whitechurch, as well as further destinations such as Stillorgan and University College Dublin.
