= Stillorgan RFC =

Irish rugby union club in County Dublin, Ireland

(Republic of Ireland) Stillorgan-Rathfarnham
- Full name: Stillorgan-Rathfarnham Rugby Football Club
- Union: IRFU; Leinster
- Nickname: The Parish
- Founded: 1973; 53 years ago (as Salesians RFC)
- Ground: Heavey Technology Park

Official website
- www.stillorganrathfarnhamrfc.ie

Stillorgan-Rathfarnham RFC is an Irish rugby union club based in County Dublin. They play in the Leinster Metropolitan League. There are also teams playing at J4 and J5 standard. The club colours are maroon, white and navy. Originally known as Salesians RFC and later Stillorgan RFC, the club was renamed to Stillorgan-Rathfarnham RFC in 2018. In 2023, the club moved into Tibradden Road, Rathfarnham with new grounds, known as Heavey Technology Park, having three playing pitches and floodlights.

== Club history ==
Stillorgan Rugby Club (formerly known as Salesians RFC) was founded and first registered with the Leinster Branch of rugby in 1973, when a group of former pupils from schools run by the Salesian fathers themselves playing together in Dublin. Most were a long way from home and had attended school in the Salesian colleges Pallaskenry, Limerick, Warranstown in Meath and Ballinakill in County Laois.

The application was made to the Leinster Branch, who had to be satisfied that the club had a home pitch, complete with dressing rooms and showers. After a bit of searching, a pitch of sorts was found in Maynooth and the application was approved Salesians played their first season at J3 level in the 1973 to 1974 season with moderate success and were soon fielding two teams. The first team colours were red jerseys with black collars and cuffs and black shorts. The club strip was changed in 1978 to reflect the school colours of the new Salesian college which had recently opened in Celbridge. Stillorgan suffered in the early 1980s when many of its founding members retired and the club was forced to move its homeground to the Royal Hospital Kilmainham. In the 1986/1987 season, the club moved to CUS Sports Grounds Bird Avenue. The club continued to grow and today it fields three teams in various leagues and cups. In recent times, the firsts have won the Leinster J3 Section B Pennant and Leinster J3 League Title.

In 2018, the club renamed from Stillorgan RFC to Stillorgan-Rathfarnham RFC and in 2023, the club moved into newly built grounds on Tibradden Road, Rathfarnham. These grounds are known as Heavey Technology Park. As of 2026, a new clubhouse is being built on the grounds.
