= Q-ZAR =

Laser tag game

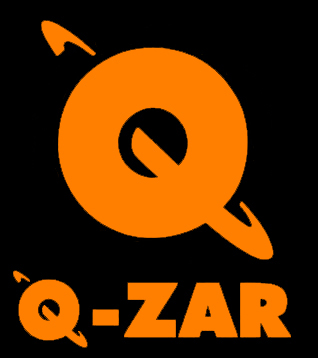
- Type: Private
- Industry: Laser tag, Entertainment
- Founded: 1987
- Founders: Geoff Haselhurst, Peter Robertson
- Headquarters: Perth, Western Australia, Australia,
- Area served: Worldwide
- Key people: Will Low, J.R. Robles
- Products: Laser tag systems, vests, phasers
- Website: Q-ZAR Systems

Q-ZAR (called Quasar in the UK and Ireland, and LaserGame in Sweden) is a type of laser tag that was developed by Geoff Haselhurst, Peter Robertson, and Omnitronics in Perth, Western Australia. The rights were later sold to Leisureplex Ltd, a company based in Ireland, which in turn sold them to Q-ZAR International based in Dallas, Texas.

== Gameplay ==
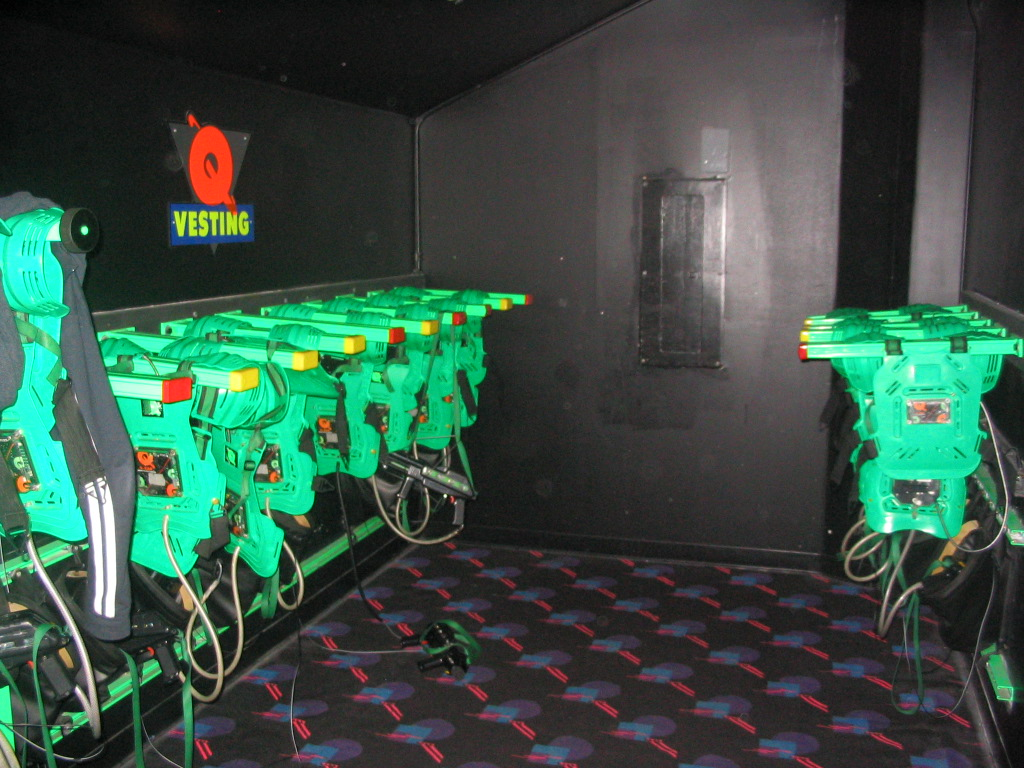
Green Q-ZAR Packs hanging in the Vesting Room

Like other laser tag games, Q-ZAR is played with a gun (or "phaser") that fires harmless beams of infrared light detected by equipment worn by the players. A laser pulse is emitted on firing for visual effect. Players score points by tagging opponents or stationary objects.

The standard game involves two teams: red and green (Quasar Elite uses red and blue). Each team has a Headquarters (HQ) to defend. Players can deactivate the opposing HQ by tagging it twice within a set interval. The winning team has the most points at the end of the game.

When tagged, the vest vibrates and makes a sound. Players have around one second to fire a "reflex" shot before a six-second penalty sequence begins. For the first three seconds, players cannot tag or be tagged. In the final three seconds, players can be tagged but cannot tag others. Being tagged during this period restarts the penalty.

The phaser has an LED display:

- Un-energised packs show the pack's ID above a "U".
- During play, the top number shows remaining lives, the bottom shows shots.
- Running out of shots loses a life; a "Good Shot" resets the shot counter.
- Holding the trigger for three seconds can activate a "bomb" affecting nearby vests.

== History ==
Q-ZAR was created by Geoff Haselhurst in 1987 in Perth, Australia. The system was sold to Irish investors in 1991. Trademark conflicts outside the UK led to the international name Q-ZAR. Manufacturing remained in Ireland, but corporate headquarters moved to the USA.

In 1996, Q-ZAR listed on NASDAQ and launched a child-focused version called Q-KIDZ. Financial difficulties followed, and the company filed for bankruptcy on 5 November 1997.

In 1995, Q-Support was established by former manager Zac Adams, providing parts to existing Q-ZAR centers. Most centers used Q-Support rather than corporate parts, contributing to the closure of corporate services. Q-Support closed in 1999.

In 2000, Will Low purchased some Q-ZAR assets, forming Q-ZAR World Wide. Legal disputes over the trademark followed. In 2002, Laser Light Entertainment, Inc. purchased the Concord, California, location. In 2003, J. R. Robles acquired remaining Q-ZAR assets from Jarvis Entertainment and formed Q-ZAR USA. Laser Light Entertainment registered the Q-ZAR trademark in 2008 and acquired Low's assets, selling Q-ZAR equipment since 2003.

In the UK and Europe, Quasar Manufacturing Ltd (formerly Quasar UK) acquired Q-ZAR trademarks in 2001. In 2005, they released Quasar Elite (Mark VI), with revised software and hardware. In 2009, Quasar Manufacturing tested Mark VII wireless equipment, released in late 2011.

== Hardware ==
Q-ZAR vests evolved from Mark I to Mark VII:

- Mark I: Strap-based vest, metal sensors, small pistol.
- Mark IIIB: Two-handled gun with integrated electronics; strap vest retained.
- Mark IV: Lighter gun, plastic body armor vest.
- Mark VI (Quasar Elite): Smaller gun, body armor for children, blue equipment for colorblind players.
- Mark VII (Wireless): Radio frequency connectivity instead of infrared.

Components include:

- Packs – Vest and phaser worn by players.
- Network Boxes – Configurable as Energizers, HQs, or bombs.
- Scoreboards – Show points and remaining time.
- Software – Runs on PC for game setup and score tracking.
- Marshal Gun/Phaser – Can change teams or energize packs.
- Handicap Gun/Phaser – Adjusts gameplay for difficulty or accessibility.
- Recharger – Charges and resets guns in the vesting room.

== Game types ==
- Energise – Players have lives, can gain more at Energizers.
- Eliminator – Players eliminated when lives run out.
- Supercharge – Must tag five opponents before deactivating HQ.
- Stun – Beginner mode with infinite lives.
- Battlefield – Mines (unused packs) as obstacles.
- Gauntlet – Solo mode deactivating both Energizers.

== Game options ==
Options include Solo/Spies, disabling reflex shots, defense shields, bomb activation, HQ reset/delay times, shots per second, and Fun/Kiddie modes.

== Locations ==
=== Australia ===
- Perth – Original Venue – The first Q-ZAR location, known as the Quasar Centre, opened in 1987 at 160 Beaufort Street, Northbridge, Western Australia.
- Fremantle – An early venue was also established in Fremantle around 1987.

=== North America ===
- Carle Place, New York – Q-ZAR Long Island.
- Wesley Chapel, Florida – Q-ZAR Laser Tag.
- Concord, California – Laser Light Entertainment Q-ZAR center
- North Bay, Ontario – North Bay Q-ZAR 3,800 sq ft arena.

=== United Kingdom & Ireland ===
- Over 60 locations – operated by Quasar Elite across the UK and Europe.
- Ireland – Quasar Ireland venues.

=== Sweden ===
- LaserGame – Swedish Q-ZAR locations under the LaserGame brand.

== Tournaments ==
Q-ZAR tournaments exist in the USA, UK, Ireland, Italy, Russia, Sweden, and Ecuador. Most use one shot per second, reflex shots, and defense shields. UK and Ireland host multi-day events 1–5 times per year. Italy runs a national tournament annually.

== See also ==
- Laser tag
