= Wye (rail) =

Triangular arrangement joining three rail lines

A simple wye

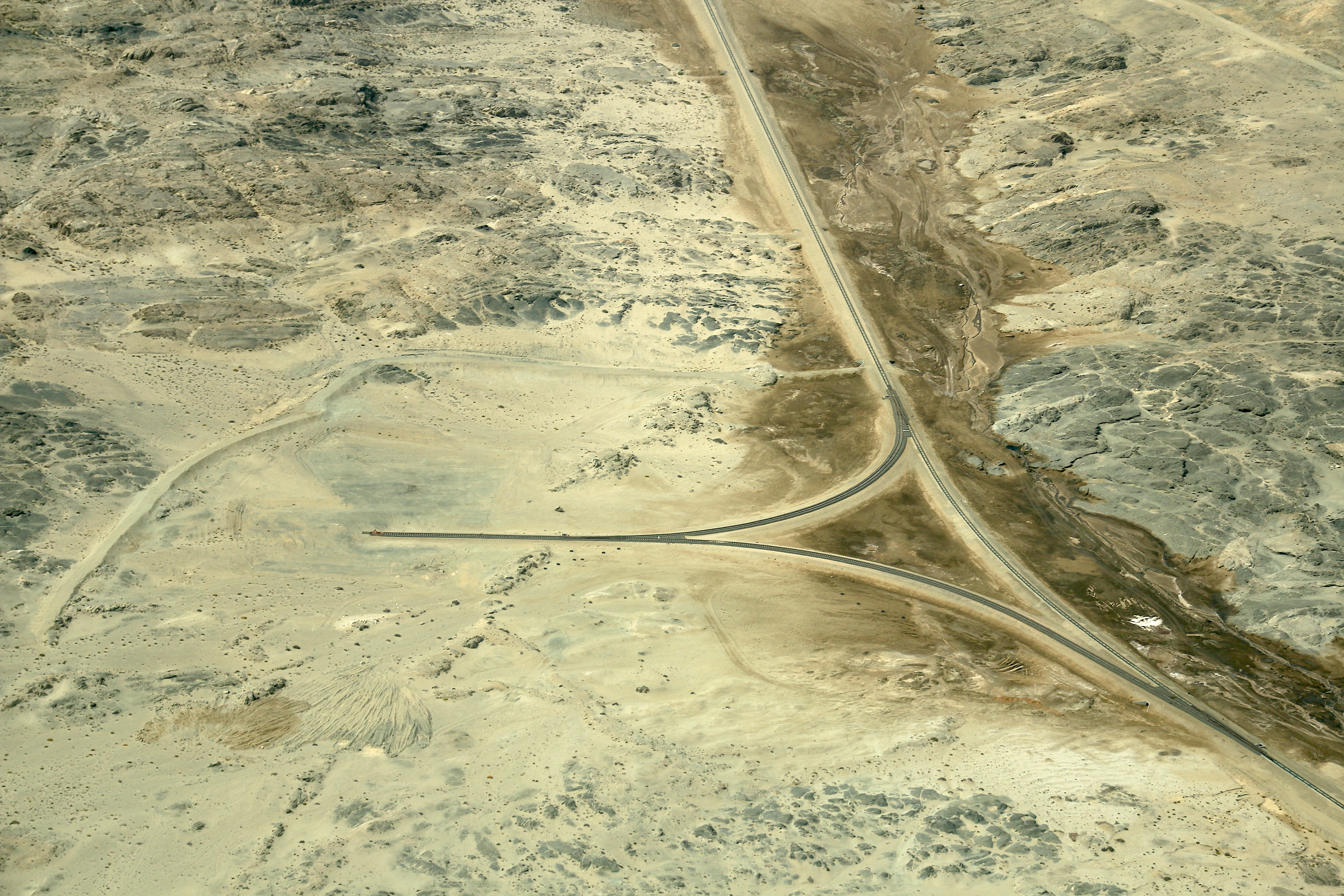
Countryside wye near Lüderitz, Namibia

In railroad structures and rail terminology, a wye (like the 'Y' glyph) or triangular junction (often shortened to just triangle) is a triangular joining arrangement of three rail lines with a railroad switch (set of points) at each corner connecting to the incoming lines. A turning wye is a specific case.

Where two rail lines join, or where a spur line diverges from a railroad's mainline, wyes can be used at a mainline rail junction to allow incoming trains to travel in either direction.

Wyes can also be used for turning railway equipment, and generally cover less area than a balloon loop doing the same job, but at the cost of two additional sets of points to construct and then maintain. These turnings are accomplished by performing the railway equivalent of a three-point turn through successive junctions of the wye. The direction of travel and the relative orientation of a locomotive or railway vehicle thus can be reversed. Where a wye is built specifically for equipment reversing purposes, one or more of the tracks making up the junction will typically be a stub siding.

Tram or streetcar tracks also make use of triangular junctions and sometimes have a short triangle or wye stubs to turn the car at the end of the line.

== Considerations ==
=== At junctions ===
The use of triangular junctions allows flexibility in routing trains from any line to either of the two other paths, without the need to reverse the train. For this reason they are common across most rail networks. A slower train may be signaled to temporarily enter a wye (as a refuge siding in lieu of a passing loop) for a meet with an oncoming train, or to allow a faster one to overtake, and then reverse out to continue in the original direction.

Where one or more of the lines forming the junction are multi-track, the presence of a triangular junction does introduce a number of potential conflicting moves. For this reason, where traffic is heavy the triangle may incorporate flying junctions on some of the legs.

=== For turning equipment ===
Illustration of the usage of a wye track for turning a rail vehicle

From time to time it is necessary to turn both individual pieces of railroad equipment or whole trains. This may be because the piece of equipment is not directionally symmetrical, for example, most steam locomotives and some diesel locomotives, or where the consist has a dedicated tail end car such as an observation car. Even where equipment is symmetrical, periodic turning may still be necessary in order to equalize wear (e.g., on the London Underground's Circle Line).

Several different techniques can be used to achieve such turning. Turntables require the least space, but can generally only deal with a single piece of equipment at a time. Balloon or turning loops can turn trains of any length — up to the total length of the loop — in a single operation, but require far more space than wyes. Rail wyes can be constructed on sites where a loop would not be possible, and can turn trains up to the length of the stub tracks at the end of the wye.

Railroad systems in North America and Australia have tended to have more wyes than railroads elsewhere. North American locomotives and cars (such as observation cars) are more likely to be directional than those found on other continents. In Canada and the United States, the railroad often was built before other structures, and railway builders had much more freedom to lay down tracks where they wished. Similarly, when not constrained by space limitations many early Australian railways made use of wyes (particularly in rural locations) for their lower installation and maintenance costs; however, their necessity and use diminished from the 1960s onwards with the major trend in most states toward bidirectional locomotives and railcars.

In Europe, although some use was made of bi-directional tank locomotives and push–pull trains, most steam locomotives were uni-directional. Because of land usage considerations, turntables were normally used to turn such locomotives, and most terminal stations and locomotive depots were so equipped. Over time, most diesel and electric locomotives ordered in Europe have been designed to be fully bi-directional and normally with two driving cabs. Thus most rail wyes, where they existed, and turntables have been taken out of use.

=== Streetcar or tram systems ===
Similar considerations as for mainline rail systems apply to the use of triangular junctions and reversing wyes on streetcar and tram systems. Many, although by no means all, streetcar and tram systems use single ended vehicles that have doors on one side only, and that must be turned at each end of the route.

However, the vehicles used on such systems tend to have much smaller minimum curvature requirements than heavy rail equipment. This renders the use of a balloon loop more practical in a small amount of space, and with street-running vehicles such a loop may be able to use side streets or street squares. However, although turning loops are the most common way of turning such vehicles, wye tracks are also sometimes used.

=== Disadvantages ===
A triangle may have a situational disadvantage in train operations when space constraints of the local geography cause one leg of triangle to bypass a main station. In tight city environments, this can happen easily, as it did, for example, at Cootamundra West, Australia and Tecuci, Romania, where extra passenger stations had to be built to serve trains taking the shortcut.

In contrast, the engineering of a terminus station such as Woodville Railway Station, New Zealand avoided this problem by building a balloon loop (reversing loop) so that trains can serve the main station in either direction without the need to reverse. In a midline station where it is desired to reverse a consist or locomotive, a double-track and turning wye arrangement is far more common.

=== Land usage ===
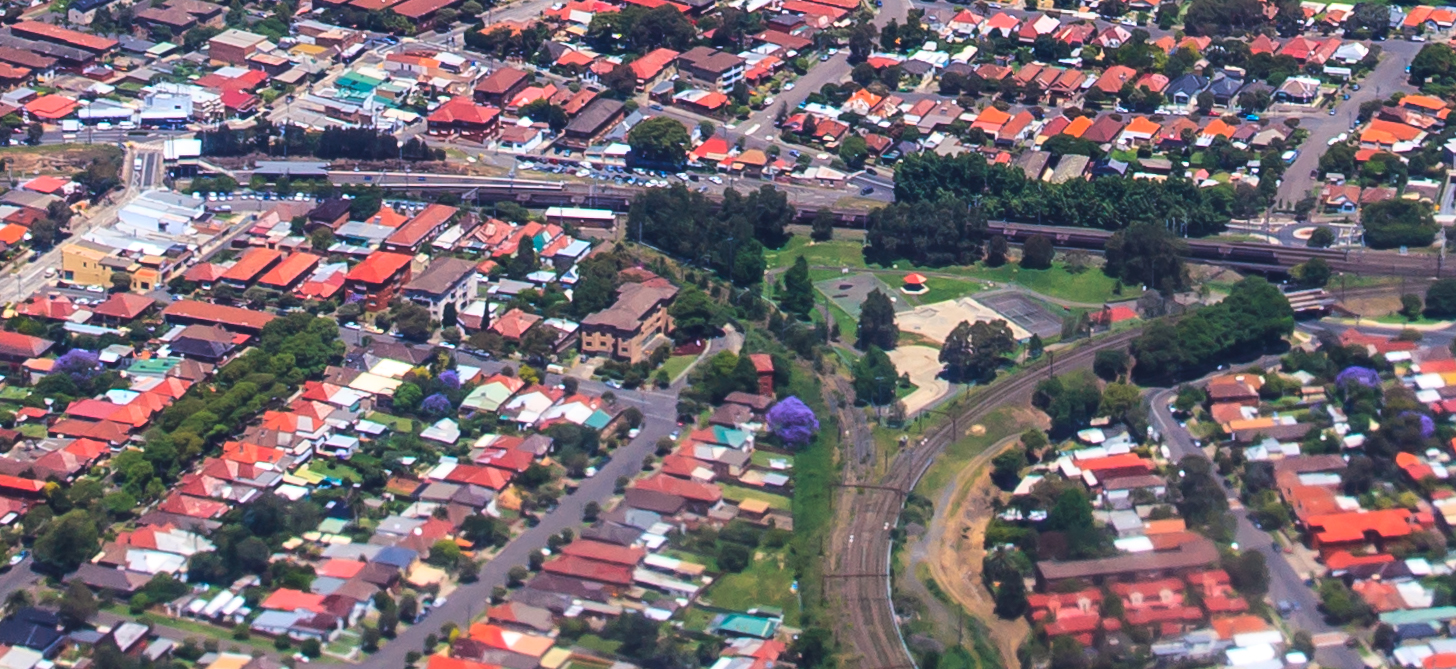
A park located within a triangular junction in Sydney, Australia

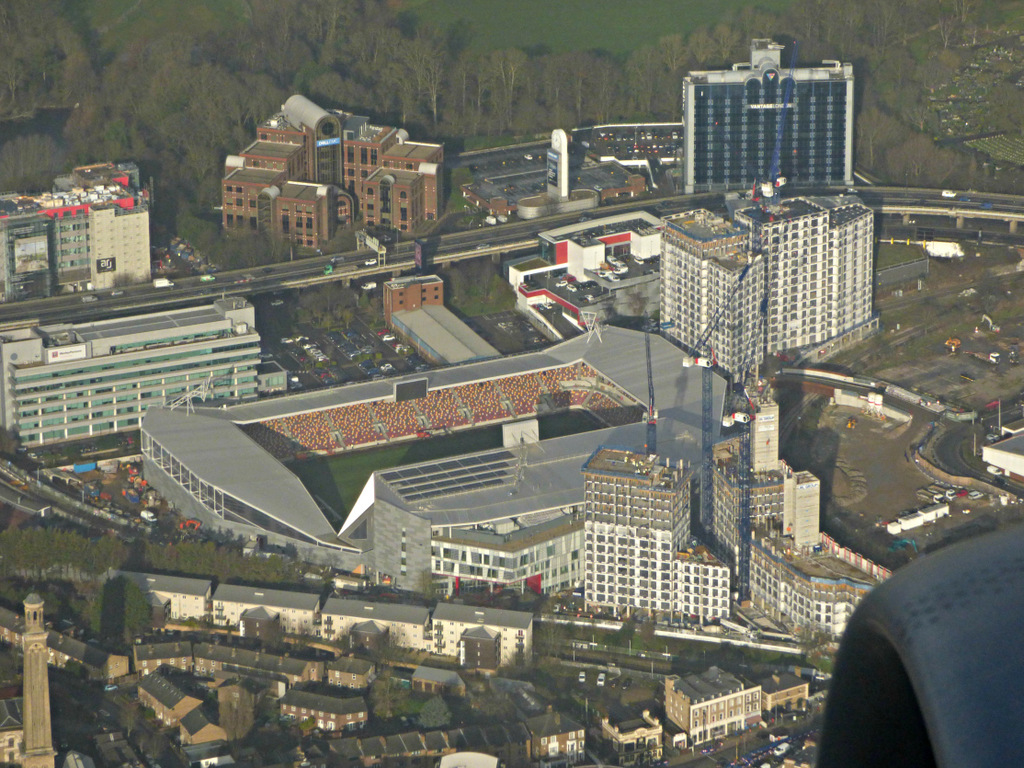
The Brentford Community Stadium in London was built within a wye.

The land within a triangle is cut off from the adjacent area (and normally fenced off) and has marginal commercial value, so will be purposed mainly for the railway's exclusive use – generally being used for maintenance depots, storage, or vehicle parking. On electrified lines substations tend to be located inside triangles, in part because the land is cheap, and also because it provides the most convenient and flexible sectioning arrangements.

== Earliest examples ==
The earliest British (and possibly worldwide) example is the double-tracked triangle within Earlestown railway station on the Liverpool and Manchester Railway, which was completed by the Grand Junction Railway in 1837. The triangle has two passenger platform faces on each of its three sides and five of the six platforms are in frequent (half-hourly, etc.) use by passenger trains. When steam engines were in regular use the triangle (which is of course also traversed by freight trains) was also used to turn locomotives, and can still be so used.

An earlier example may be on the Cromford and High Peak Railway, which had been opened in 1831 as a horse-drawn railway. This appears to have been used for reversing trains of wagons with end doors that have just come up the rope-hauled inclines to the highest level of the railway before they proceeded down the remaining inclines. The site of this can still be seen near Hindlow, in Derbyshire. (National Grid location grid reference ST316887.).

== Examples by country ==
=== Australia ===
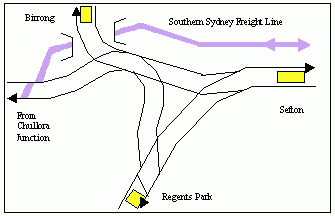
Double track triangle, drawn in one-rail style

Sefton railway station in Sydney lies on one corner of a triangular junction, which allows trains to branch off in either direction without the need to terminate or change ends. One train a day from Birrong to Sefton does terminate and reverse at Regents Park station (in order to clean the rust off the crossover rails). There is a goods branch from Chullora and, in the future, the possibility of a separate single track freight line. The three passenger stations at the vertices of the triangle have island platforms making it convenient to change trains. The sharp curves of the triangle, and especially the turnouts on those sharp curves, restrict train speeds to between 10 and 50 km/h (6.2 and 31.1 mph). Near Hamilton station on the Central Coast and Newcastle line there is a wye for freight trains and regional trains. This puts them directly on the Main Northern line.

A number of triangular junctions were built on the Victorian Railways network, both at major junctions, and for turning locomotives and train consists in places where the provision of a turntable was impractical or unnecessarily expensive. These included:

- Wodonga – Built on the junction of the Cudgewa Line and used to turn the consists of the Sydney Limited and Spirit of Progress trains.
- Ararat
- North Geelong – built to allow trains to travel directly between Geelong, Ballarat or Melbourne without using a run-around or turntable. It was also used to turn trains, such as during the demonstration run of the Spirit of Progress in 1937.

A triangular junction is used to turn tramcars on the Portland Cable Tram line in Portland, Victoria.

=== Ireland ===
In the Republic of Ireland two triangular junctions are in use. One is at Limerick Junction, and the other at Lavistown, near Kilkenny. The former allows direct Limerick–Dublin passenger trains to bypass the Limerick Junction station, and is also occasionally used to turn steam locomotives on railtours, whilst the latter is used primarily by freight trains running between the Port of Waterford and County Mayo to avoid having to run around in Kilkenny station.

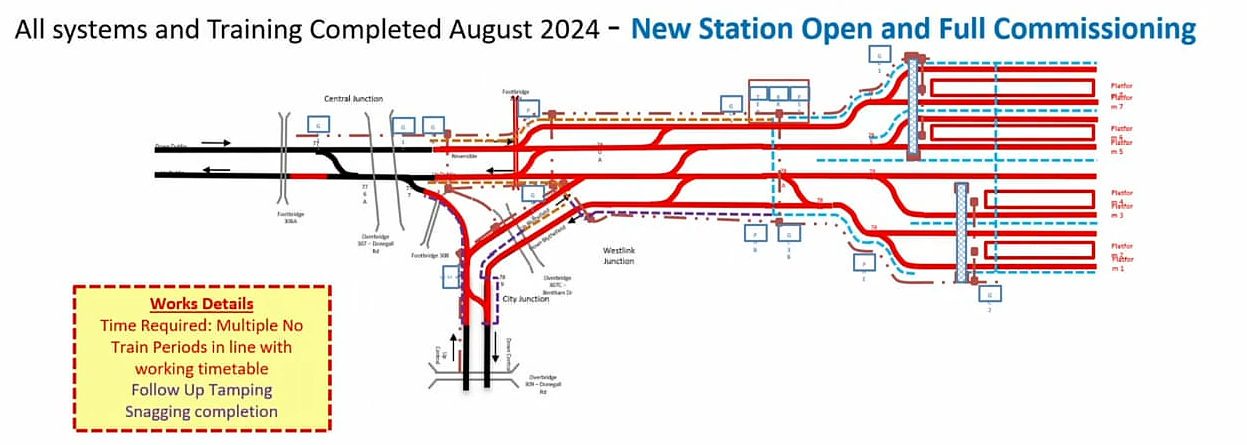

In Belfast, Northern Ireland, a triangular junction exists at Grand Central station. It is rarely used to turn locomotives, save the occasional steam engine. It is only used for out of service trains. Commuter trains enter the junction from one direction (e.g., the Portadown line), stop at Grand Central, and then continue out on the other direction towards Bangor station. Commuter trains on NI Railways are all diesel multiple unit railcars, so they do not need to use the junction as a turning method.

The only other operational triangular junction in Ireland is Downpatrick Loop on the Downpatrick and County Down Railway. Originally constructed to allow direct Belfast–Newcastle trains to bypass Downpatrick station, the triangle forms the basis of a heritage railway, the only heritage railway of this type in the British Isles. There is one station at each end of the triangle and another in the southernmost corner.

Historical triangular junctions in Ireland include Moyasta Junction on the West Clare line, the Monkstown/Greenisland/Bleach Green triangle on the Northern Counties Committee and Bundoran Junction on the Great Northern Railway. Though two sides of the former are still in mainline use, the "back line" between Monkstown and Greenisland has been removed, whilst the latter was closed altogether in 1957. Additionally, the Great Northern's largest locomotive yard at Adelaide never had a turntable, using a dedicated turning triangle instead.

The Luas tram system has a triangular junction on the Red Line between the stations of Busáras, Connolly and George's Dock. The line that goes between George's Dock and Connolly is never used, as no trams operate between The Point and Connolly.

=== Italy ===
Railways in Italy used a number of "inversion stars" for turning locomotives. This uses a pentagram layout, requiring four movements and five turnouts to reverse. It allows a smaller layout, without excessively tight curve radii, compared to a triangle.

Some of these still survive, such as at the original terminus of Carbonia in Sardinia and at Mals or Malles Venosta in Val Venosta in the South Tyrol.

Inversion star or convoluted wye

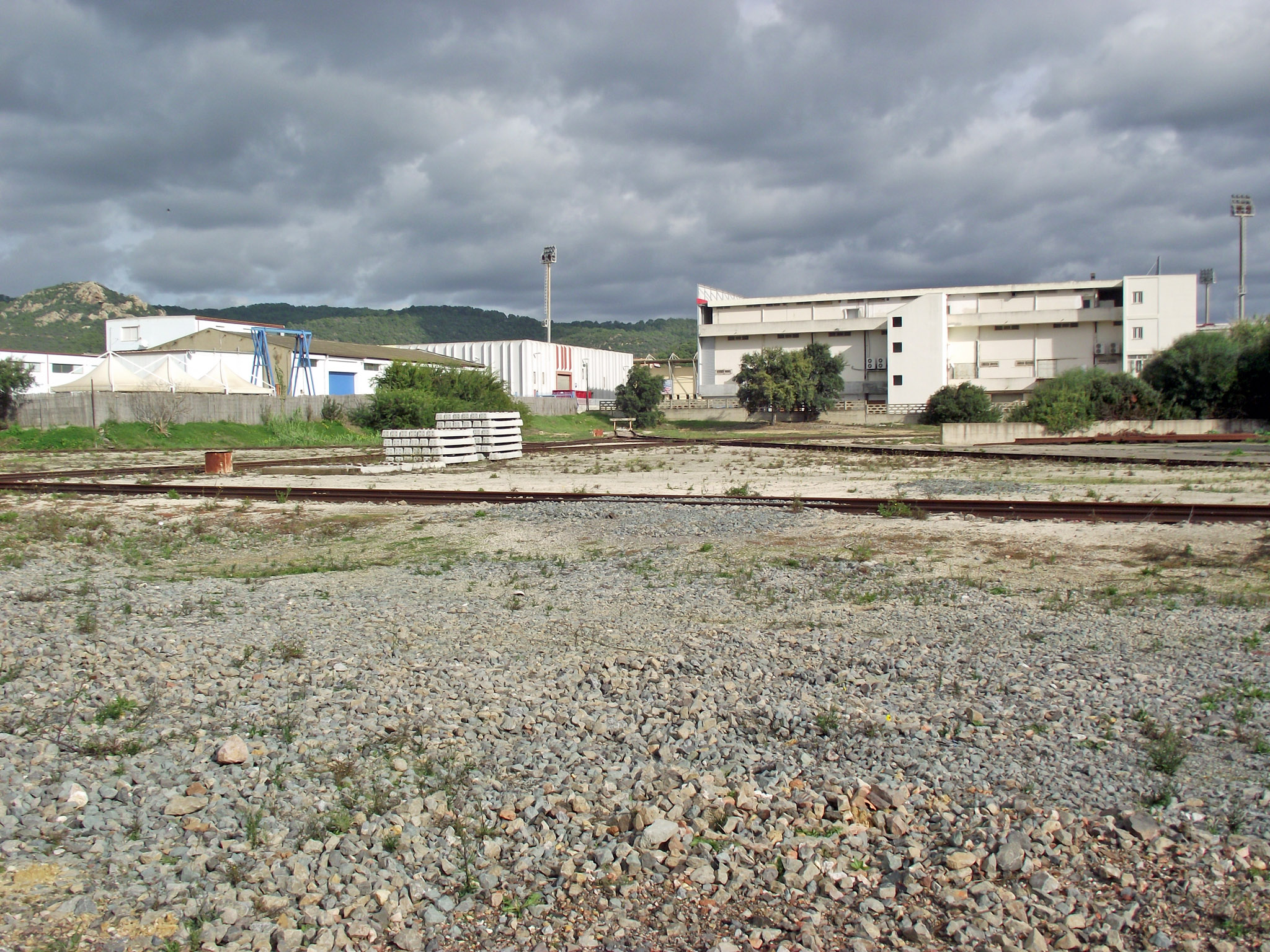
Carbonia

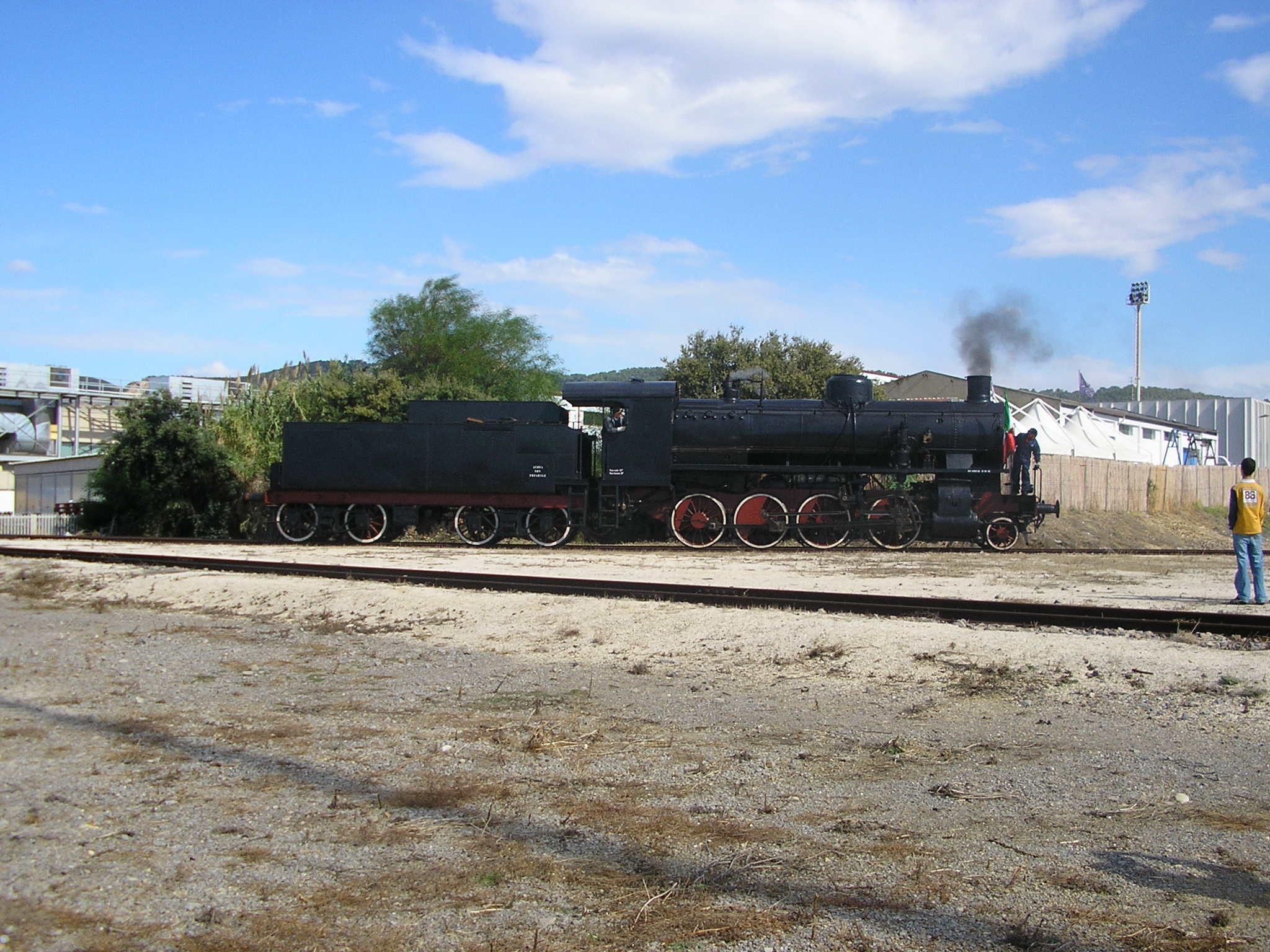
Carbonia

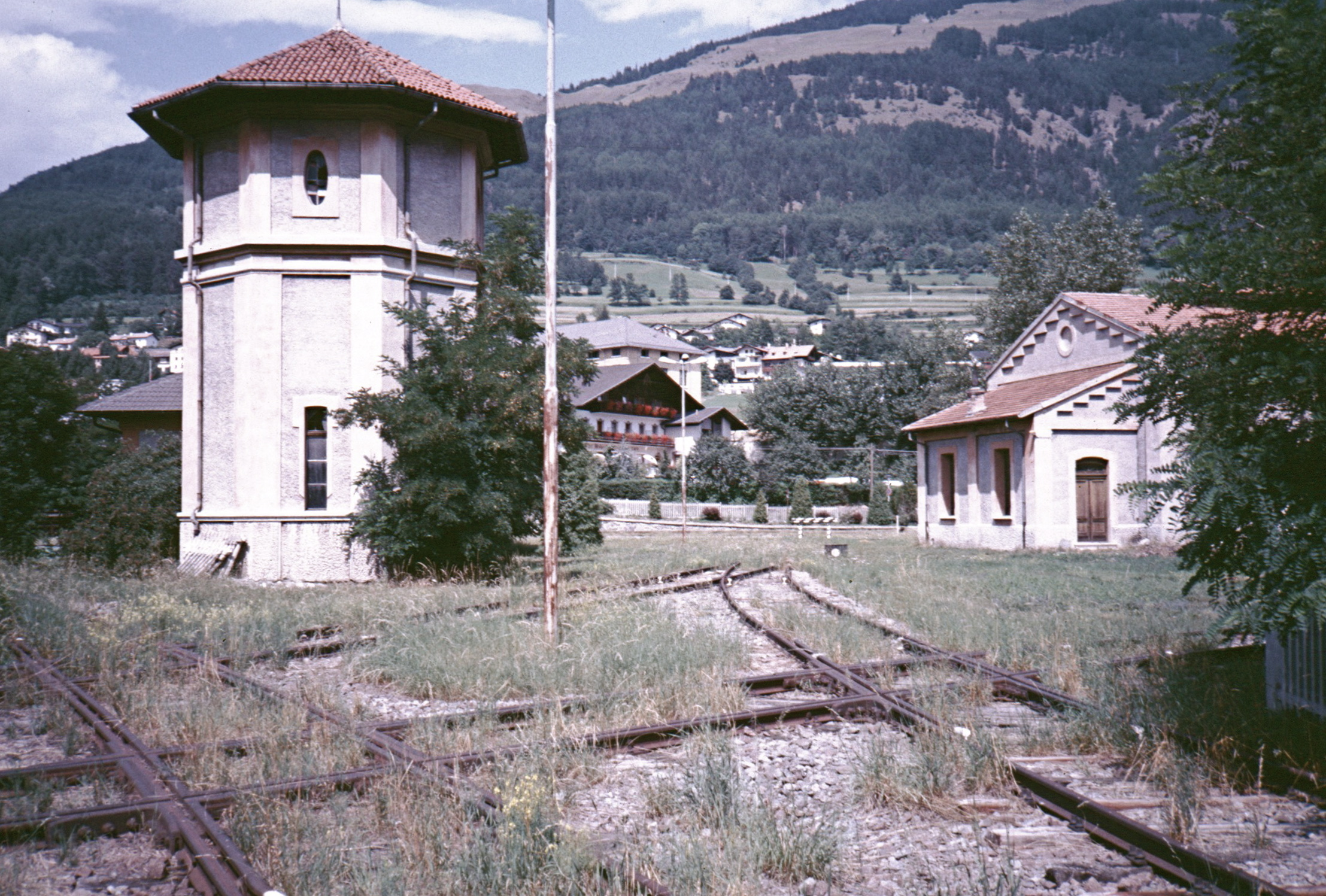
Mals

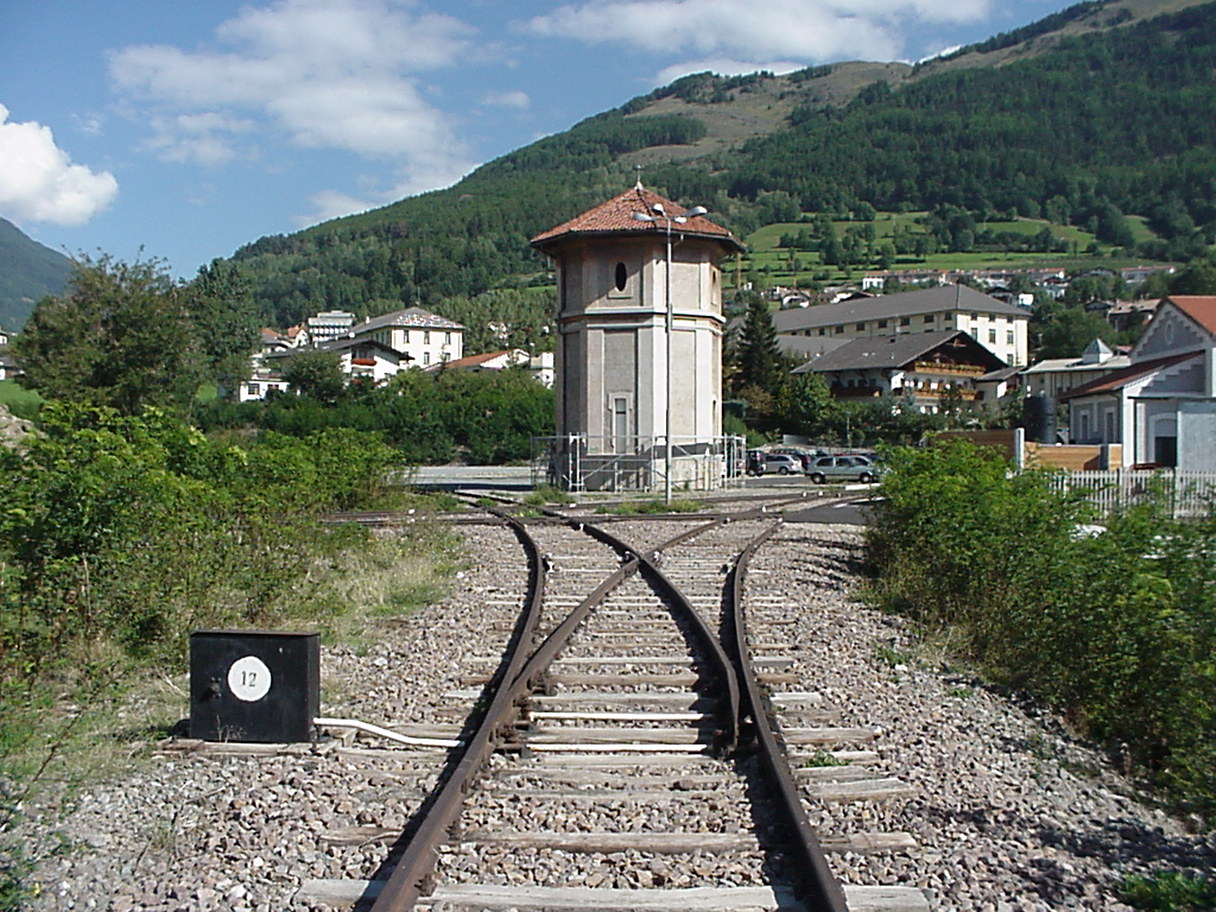
Mals

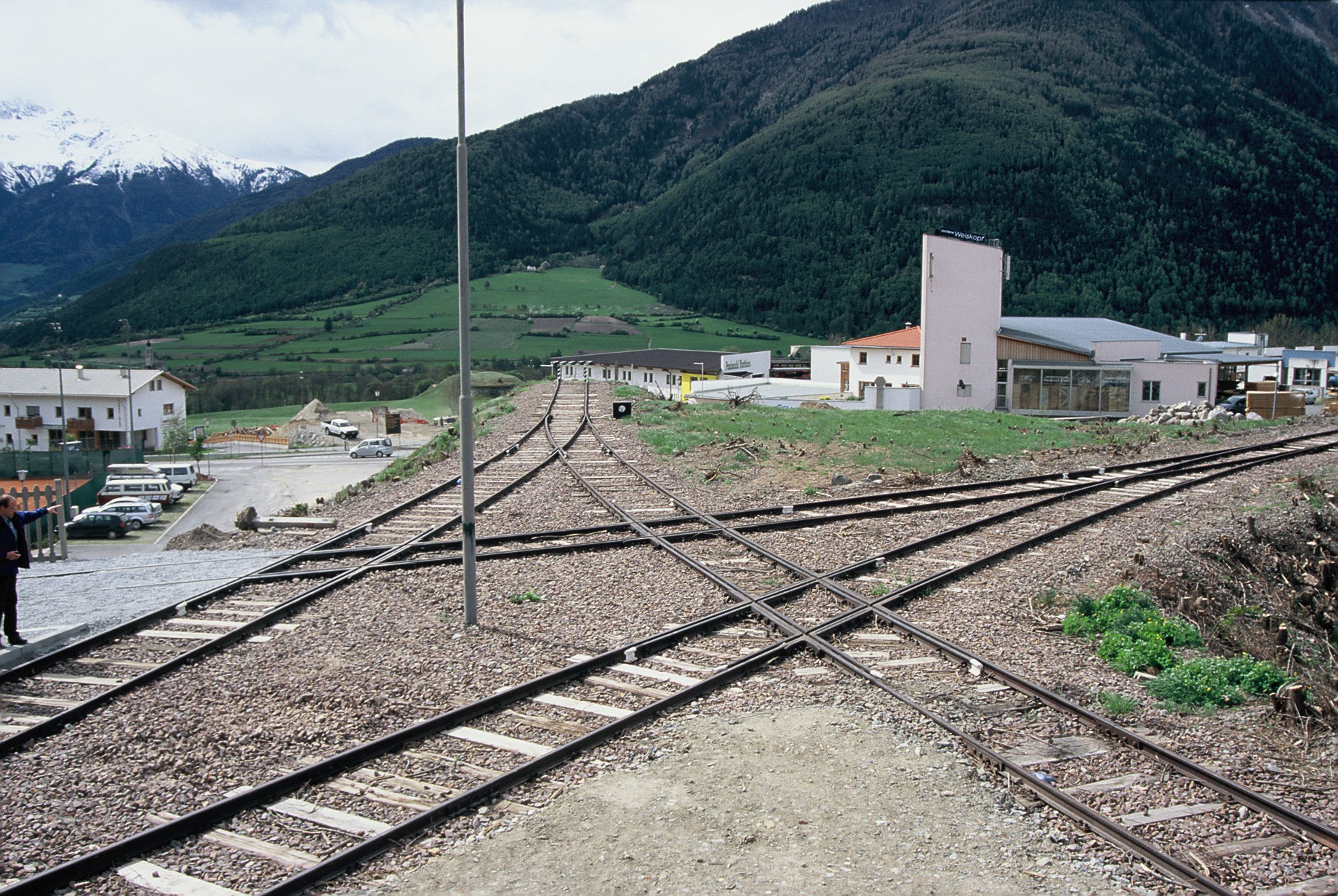
Mals

In addition to small terminal stations such as Carbonia and Malles Venosta, inversion stars were also installed at some principal stations such as Verona Porta Nuova and Brenner at the summit of the Brenner Pass.

=== Namibia ===
Tsumeb railway station in Namibia has two triangles. The first and smaller one is for turning engines and is near the station. The second and larger one is to bypass the dead-end station at Tsumeb for trains travelling directly between the new extension towards Angola and Windhoek. This direct bypass line can save an hour of shunting time, particularly if the train is longer than the loops in the station.

=== Switzerland ===
There is a turning triangle partly tunnelled into the mountain at Kleine Scheidegg at the summit of the 800mm gauge Wengernalpbahn in the Bernese Oberland, Switzerland. Kleine Scheidegg is reached from two lower termini, Lauterbrunnen and Grindelwald, located on opposite sides of the col. Trains normally descend in the direction they have arrived from and are designed accordingly with the power unit at the lower end and seating angled to compensate for the gradient. They therefore have to be turned at the summit should it be necessary to make a through journey. Whilst limitations of space dictated that the triangle had to be partly constructed in tunnels it also ensures that in winter it is snow-free and thus readily available in emergencies.

=== United Kingdom ===
Modified triangle at Grantham

In Britain triangular layouts that could be used for turning locomotives were usually the result of junctions of two or more lines. There are many examples, including the one known as the Maindee triangle in Newport, South Wales. Here the ex-GWR South Wales Main Line from London to Swansea is joined by another GWR line from Shrewsbury via Hereford. The significance of it is that steam-hauled trains can run to Newport and their engines be turned using the triangle. Its National Grid location is grid reference ST316887. Shrewsbury also has a triangular route formation that was used to turn steam locomotives, and is still available. A triangle, grid reference SH294789, was provided in 1989 adjacent to the transfer sidings for Wylfa Nuclear Power Station, near to Valley on Anglesey in Wales. This enables the North Wales Coast Line to be used by steam hauled excursions. The turntable at Holyhead has long been removed and the area re-developed; the sidings at Valley some 4 miles (6.4 km) from the terminus are the nearest suitable site.

An unusual arrangement, unique in Britain, was constructed at Grantham. Its location was grid reference SK914349 and it is shown on the 1963 edition of OS 1 inch to 1 mile sheet 113. It was built in the 1950s after the turntable at the locomotive shed failed and expenditure on a replacement was no longer justified. Locomotives requiring to be turned had to travel to Barkston Junction to traverse the triangular layout there (this was where Mallard with a dynamometer car attached was turned before starting out south on its record-breaking run on 3 July 1938). The journey to Barkston Junction and back was a time-consuming business involving a round trip of some 8 miles (13 km) along the busy East Coast Main Line. Eventually authority was given to construct a turning arrangement on a strip of spare land to the west of the main line, just south of Grantham station. There was insufficient space for a conventional triangle but this was overcome by constructing an "inside-out" triangle whereby the approach tracks intersected in a scissors crossing.

=== United States ===
Many North American passenger terminals in large cities had wye tracks to allow the turning and backing of directional passenger trains onto a main line. Freight traffic could bypass the terminal through the wye. Notable examples include the Los Angeles Union Station, which has a double wye, the Saint Paul Union Depot, and the Memphis Union Station.

A typical use for a stub-end passenger station would be as follows: A wye was incorporated at the "throat" where the rows of tracks converged from the station to facilitate the turning of trains. An arriving train came to a stop on the main line after passing the wye. Once the switches on the wye are aligned, the train reversed, with the brakeman at the rear of the last car regulating the speed with the brake lever upon approach to the platform. After coming to a complete stop at the end of the track, passengers were allowed to disembark safely.

Meanwhile, the locomotives could be uncoupled from the train and sent to the engine terminal to be serviced for their next assignment. Then, the head-end cars could be uncoupled from the rest of the train and spotted by a station switcher at the parcel facility where mail and express packages were handled. The departing train was reassembled, freshly cleaned and serviced for the next journey. A steam pipe from the station's steam generator could have been attached to the train's steam line from the rear to supply heat until the locomotives were coupled up front to supply steam.

The train was announced for boarding with a list of destinations. With switches aligned, the train slowly departed to the main line, continuing on its journey or returning toward the direction from which it arrived by rounding the opposite leg from the one it reversed on upon arrival.

The Keddie Wye in Keddie, California, was built by the Western Pacific Railroad and is a remarkable engineering feat. Two sides of the wye are built on tall trestles and one side is in a tunnel bored through solid rock.

The town of Wyeville, Wisconsin, is named after the Union Pacific Railway, formerly the Chicago and North Western Transportation Company wye and crossover nearby.

A primary feature of the Bay Area Rapid Transit system is the Oakland Wye. Located beneath Downtown Oakland, California, the vast majority of the system's trains run through the wye primarily to and from San Francisco with some services running north and south along the East Bay. This section of track is considered a bottleneck for system-wide capacity based on speed restrictions and timing difficulties from distant branch lines.

The southern terminus of the Amtrak Auto Train in Sanford, Florida, uses a wye to turn the locomotives around for the return trip north. A road that crosses the eastern side of the wye allows access to the inner part of the wye where there is a rock supply company.

In Arizona, the Grand Canyon Railway (GCRY) has a wye at both the Williams and South Rim/Grand Canyon Village termini of its line. The train is turned around at the South Rim/Grand Canyon Village wye with the passengers on board. At the Williams end, the train is turned around after the passengers disembark.

The Chowchilla Wye is a primary feature of the planned California High-Speed Rail System. It will allow for transfers from feeder services on the third leg and facilitate more routing options as future phases are completed.

Hammel's Wye is a primary feature of the IND Rockaway Line, serving A and Rockaway Park Shuttle trains all day. The wye was named after a past station, Hammels station.

== Convoluted wye ==
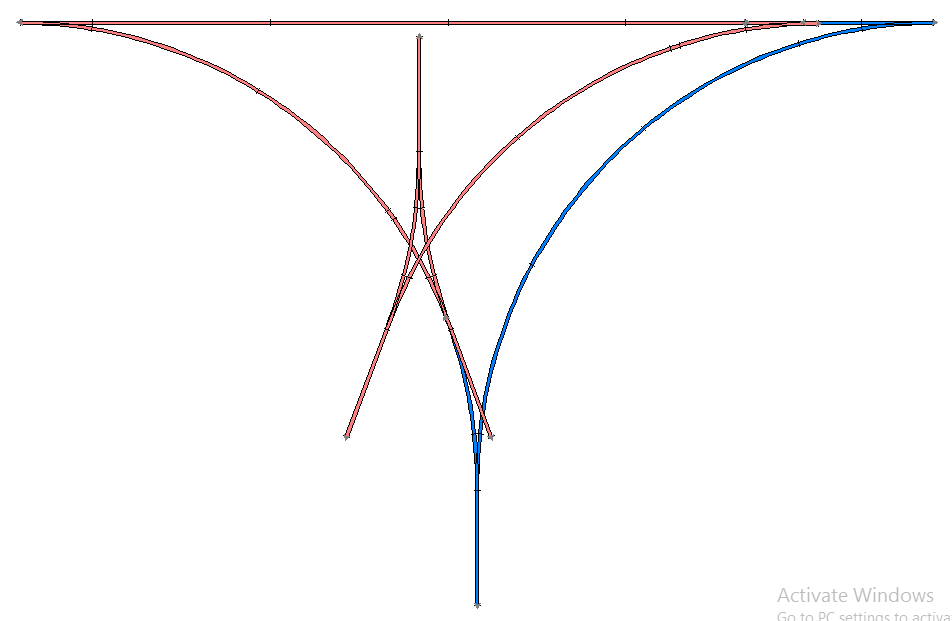
The "reversing star" (red) compared to the ordinary wye (blue)

Convoluted wye, turning star or reversing star (Italian: Stella di inversione) is a special wye layout used in places where the space is tight. It has a pentagram-like form and consists of five turnouts (versus three for a wye) and three, four or five diamond crossings. Because of this, a reversing star is more expensive to build and service.

It takes four changes of direction of movement to turn a piece of rolling stock on a reversing star.

There was a "star" layout at the summit of the Brenner Pass, on the Austrian–Italian border. It was still there in 1991, covered over with gravel so that market-stalls could function on top.

== See also ==
- Balloon loop
- Control car
- Double junction
- Flying junction
- Level junction
- Railway turntable
