= Kingswood Luas stop =

Tram stop in Dublin, Ireland

Kingswood Coill an Rí
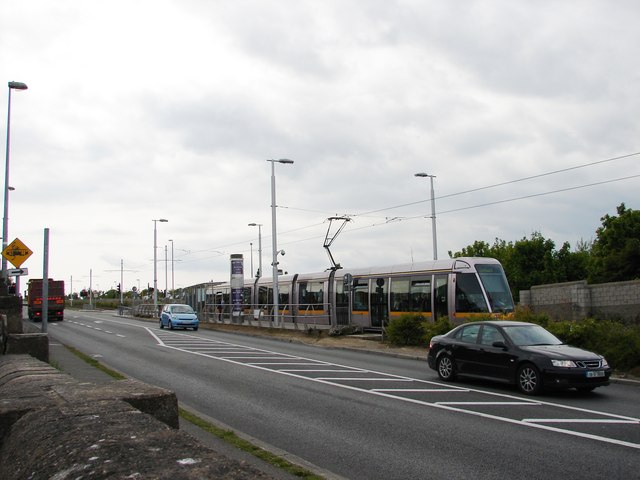
- A tram at Kingswood

General information
- Location: Dublin; Ireland
- Coordinates: 53°18′13″N 6°21′55″W
- Owner: Transport Infrastructure Ireland
- Operator: Luas
- Line: Red
- Platforms: 2
- Bus routes: 1
- Bus operators: Dublin Bus
- Connections: 56A

Construction
- Structure type: At-grade

Other information
- Fare zone: Red 4

Key dates
- 26 September 2004: Station opened

Services
Preceding station	Luas	Following station
Belgard towards Saggart or Tallaght	Red Line	Red Cow towards The Point or Connolly
Location
- Location within Dublin

Kingswood (Irish: Coill an Rí) is a stop on the Luas light-rail tram system in Dublin, Ireland. It opened in 2004 as a stop on the Red Line. The stop is located on a section of reserved track at the side of the R383 road, near the Kingswood heights housing estate. The stop is also served by Dublin Bus route 56A.
