= Citywest Campus Luas stop =

Tram stop in Dublin, Ireland

Citywest Campus Campas Gnó Iarthar na Cathrach

General information
- Location: Dublin, Leinster, Ireland
- Coordinates: 53°17′16″N 6°25′08″W
- Owner: Transport Infrastructure Ireland
- Operator: Luas
- Line: Red
- Platforms: 2

Construction
- Structure type: At-grade

Other information
- Fare zone: Red 4

Key dates
- 2 July 2011: Station opened

Services
Preceding station	Luas	Following station
Fortunestown towards Saggart	Red Line	Cheeverstown towards The Point or Connolly
Location
- Location within Dublin

Citywest Campus (Irish: Campas Gnó Iarthar na Cathrach) is a stop on the Luas light-rail tram system in Dublin, Ireland. It opened in 2011 as a stop on the extension of the Red Line to Saggart. The stop is located on a section of reserved track next to The Walk in the Citywest development in south-west Dublin which includes a hotel, golf course, shopping centre, and housing.

Citywest was still in development when the Luas line was being planned, so the streets were planned around the tram tracks. To the west of the stop, trams travel past the village green on their way to Saggart Luas stop.
