= Spencer Dock Luas stop =

Tram stop in Dublin, Ireland

Spencer Dock Duga Spencer
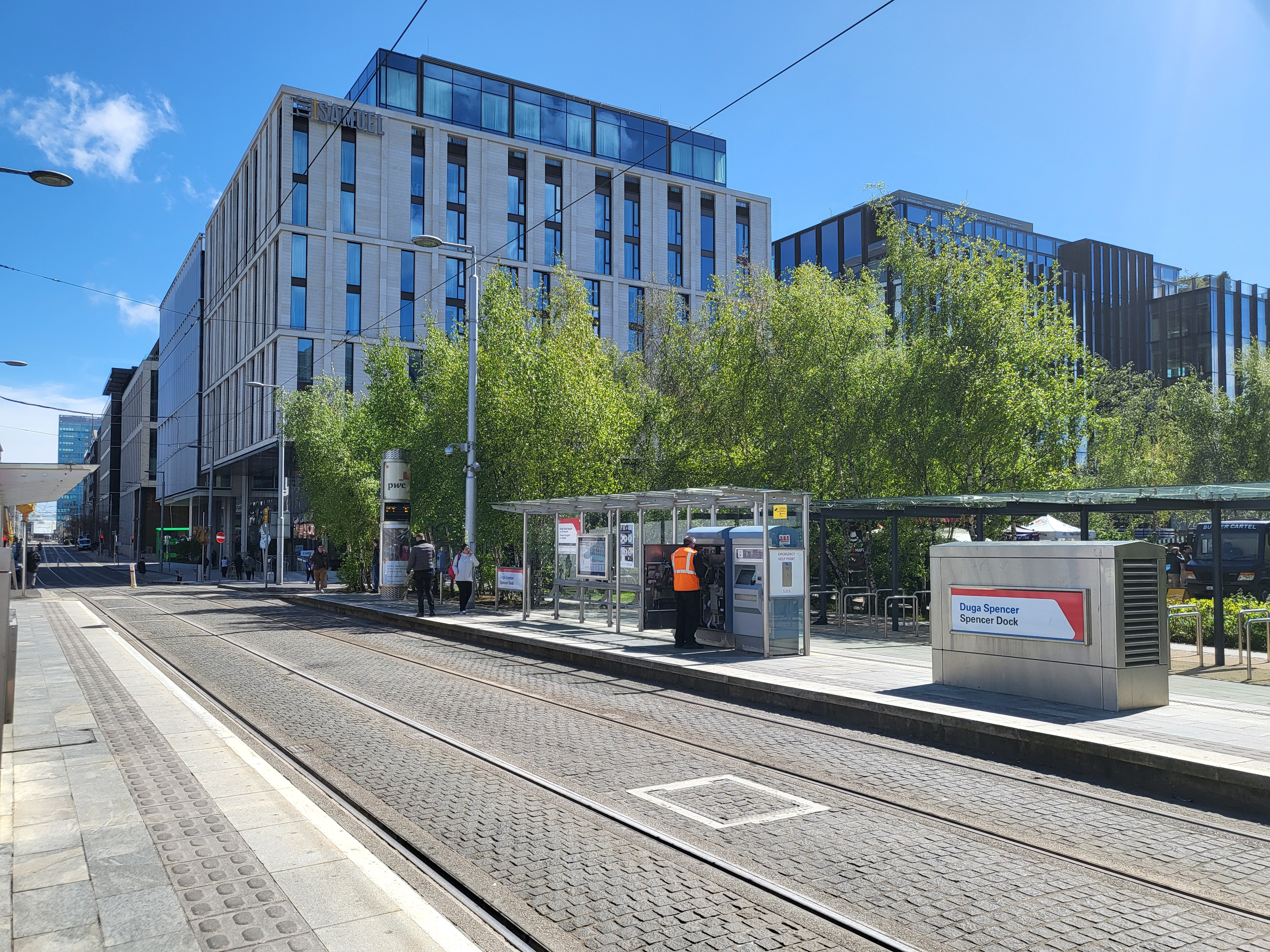
- Shelter and ticket machines at the stop

General information
- Location: Dublin; Ireland
- Coordinates: 53°20′56″N 6°14′13″W
- Owner: Transport Infrastructure Ireland
- Operator: Luas
- Line: Red
- Platforms: 2

Construction
- Structure type: At-grade

Other information
- Fare zone: Red 2

Key dates
- 8 December 2009: Station opened

Services
Preceding station	Luas	Following station
Mayor Square - NCI towards Tallaght or Saggart	Red Line	The Point; Terminus
	Proposed Services	
Preceding station	IÉ	Following station
Terminus	DART+ West	Drumcondra
Location
- Location within Dublin

Spencer Dock (Irish: Duga Spencer) is a stop on the Luas light-rail tram system in Dublin, Ireland. It opened in 2009 as one of four stops on an extension of the Red Line through the docklands to The Point. The stop is located on a section of Mayor Street Upper which is closed to other traffic, near the old North Wall railway station just next to Central Square. It provides access to many of the developments in the area, including Convention Centre Dublin.

It is located c. 200m east of the Spencer Dock Bridge which carries the LUAS over the Royal Canal.

Spencer Dock is served by Dublin Bus routes 33D, 33X, 142 and 151. and is the closest Luas stop to Docklands railway station, approximately 350m walk away.

As part of the DART+ project, a new station will be built at Spencer Dock to serve as an interchange between DART and Luas services.
