= Docklands railway station =

Station in Dublin, Ireland

Docklands Dugthailte / Ceantar na nDugaí
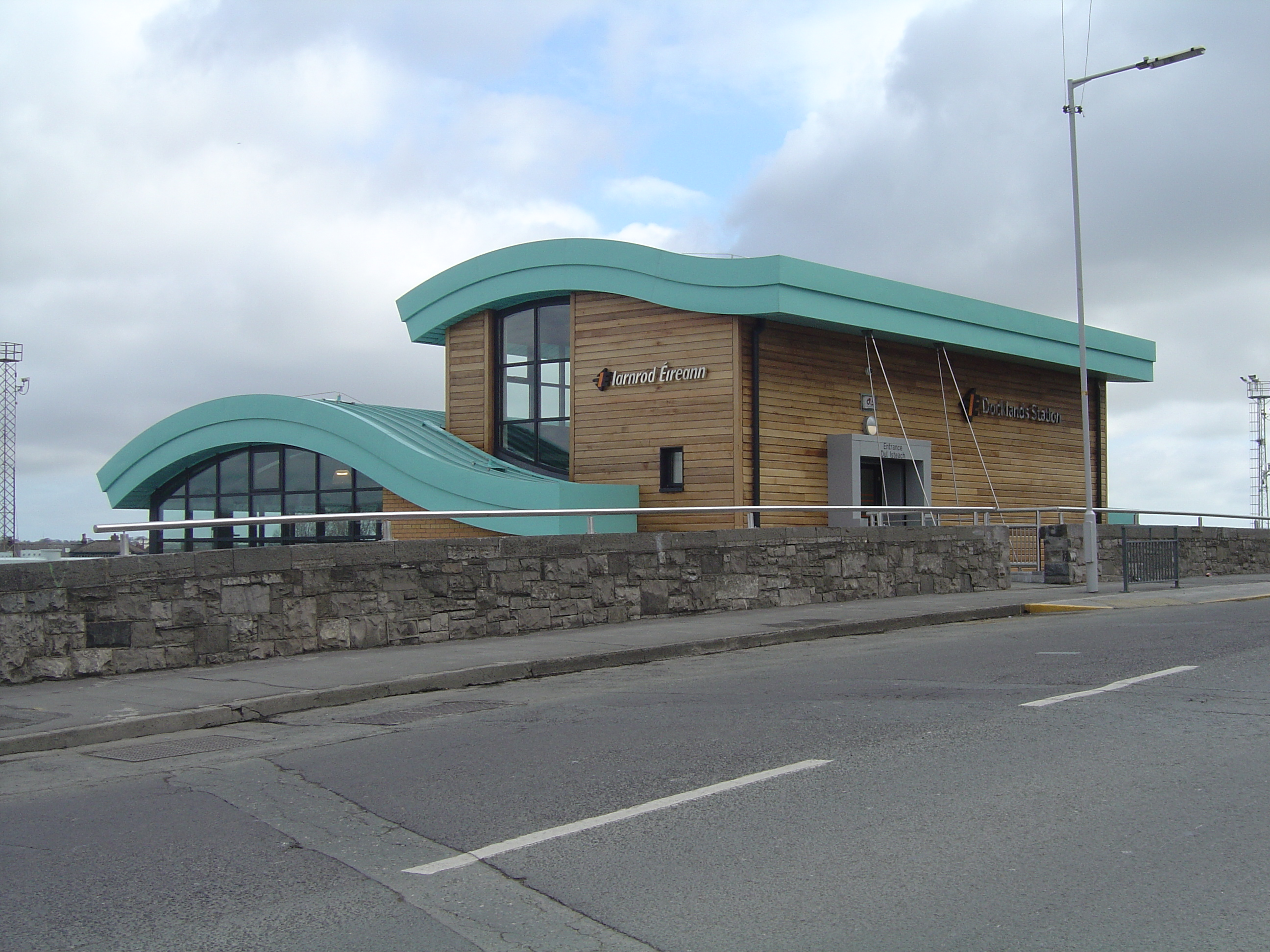
- The station building as seen from Sheriff St, 23 March 2007.

General information
- Location: Sheriff Street Upper; Dublin 1, D01 XK74; Ireland
- Coordinates: 53.350628°N 6.239355°W
- Owner: Iarnród Éireann
- Operator: Iarnród Éireann
- Platforms: 1 (Island)
- Tracks: 2
- Bus operators: Dublin Bus

Construction
- Structure type: At-grade
- Cycle facilities: Yes

Other information
- Station code: DCKLS
- Fare zone: Suburban 1

History
- Opened: 12 March 2007

Passengers
- 2018: 1,500 daily
Route map
Location

Docklands Station (Stáisiún Dugthailte, also known as Ceantar na nDugaí) is a terminus railway station serving the Dublin Docklands area in Ireland. It is owned and operated by Iarnród Éireann and was part of the Irish Government's Transport 21 initiative.

The station is one of three termini for the Western Commuter service run by Iarnród Éireann, the others being Dublin Connolly and Dublin Pearse.

== Services ==
Services run to M3 Parkway during peak times, Monday to Friday. The station is closed on Saturday and Sunday. Passengers need to change at Clonsilla for connection with the Maynooth service.

== Transport links ==
The Luas Red Line does not directly connect with Docklands Station. Instead, commuters have to walk approximately 500 metres (1,600 ft) via an indirect route to Spencer Dock or to Mayor Square - NCI. The Luas line gives a direct connection to Busáras Bus station and Dublin Heuston.

The station is linked to the city centre by Dublin Bus route 151.

== History ==
The station was opened for commuter services by Taoiseach Bertie Ahern at a temporary location on Sheriff Street in the North Wall area of Dublin's Northside on 12 March 2007. Construction groundbreaking had taken place on 9 March 2006 in the presence of the Minister for Transport, Martin Cullen. It was the first new heavy rail station in Dublin city centre since Grand Canal Dock opened in 2001. It was required because the nearby Connolly Station had reached capacity and could not support additional commuter services to County Meath.

However, in March 2008, it was reported that the transport minister, Noel Dempsey, would allow CIÉ to seek new planning permission to keep the station on a permanent basis as a terminus for services from Maynooth and Navan following his decision to allow the Railway Procurement Agency to use Broadstone Station for extensions to the Luas.

== Proposals ==
The station was to move to a permanent location in the Spencer Dock site as part of the DART Underground plan under the government's Transport 21 initiative. Planning conditions attached to the temporary site stated that it had to be removed by May 2016, but permanent permission was obtained in time to avoid this.

Though the DART Underground plans were postponed indefinitely, as of August 2021, an underground station at Spencer Dock was proposed as part of the DART+ West project.

== See also ==
- List of railway stations in Ireland
- Rail transport in Ireland
- Dublin Suburban Rail

Preceding station	Iarnród Éireann	Following station
Terminus	Commuter; Western Commuter	Broombridge
