= Mayor Square - NCI Luas stop =

Tram stop in Dublin, Ireland

Mayor Square - NCI Cearnóg an Mhéara - CNÉ
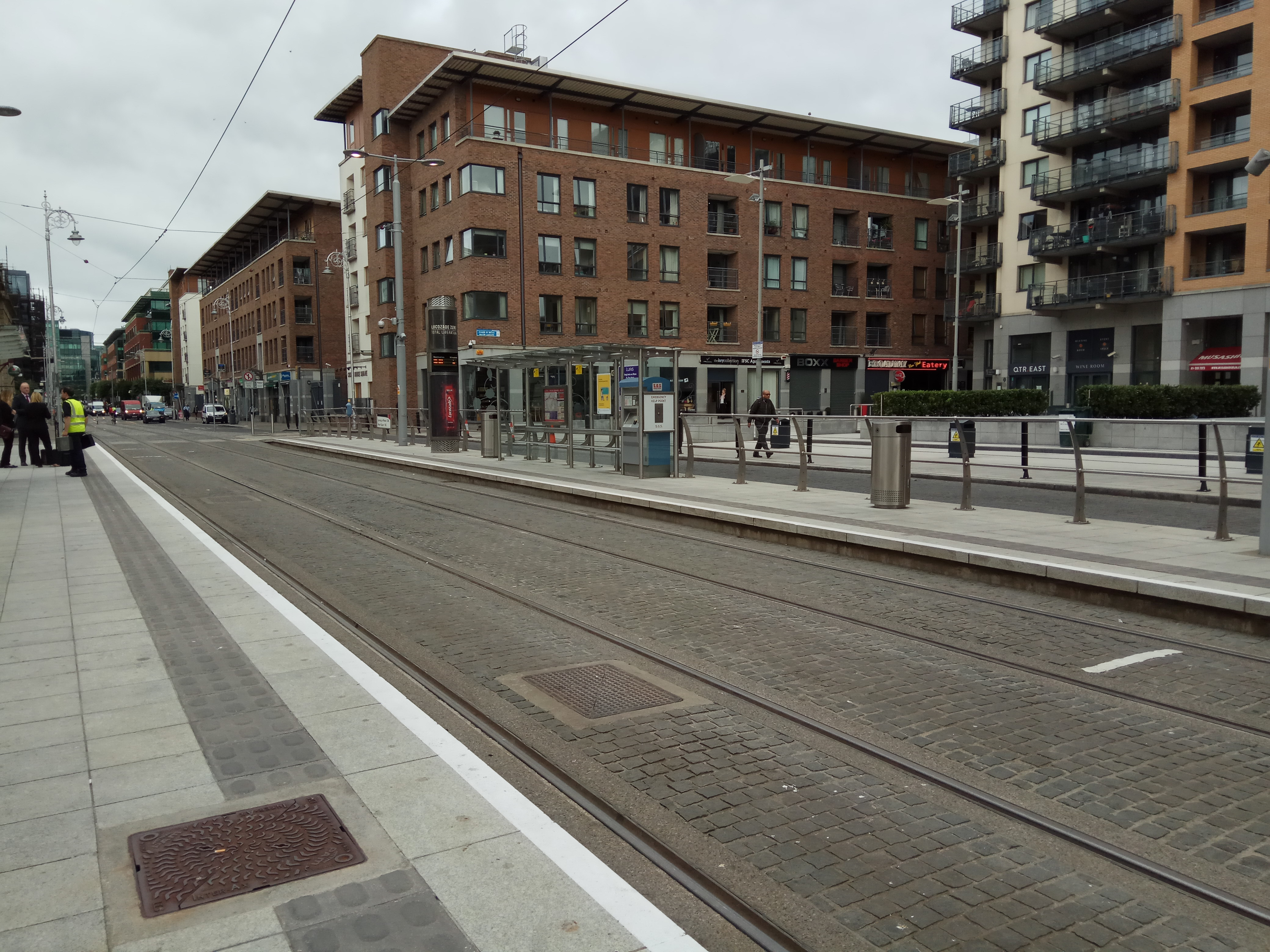
- Mayor Square stop

General information
- Location: Dublin; Ireland
- Coordinates: 53°20′57″N 6°14′36″W
- Owner: Transport Infrastructure Ireland
- Operator: Luas
- Line: Red
- Platforms: 2

Construction
- Structure type: At-grade

Other information
- Fare zone: Red 3

Key dates
- 8 December 2009: Station opened

Services
Preceding station	Luas	Following station
George's Dock towards Tallaght or Saggart	Red Line	Spencer Dock towards The Point
Location
- Location within Central Dublin

Mayor Square - NCI (Irish: Cearnóg an Mhéara - CNÉ) is a stop on the Luas light-rail tram system in Dublin, Ireland. It opened in 2009 as one of four stops on an extension of the Red Line through the docklands to The Point. The stop is located in the middle of a tram lane on Mayor Street Lower, adjacent to Mayor Square, and provides access to the National College of Ireland main campus and other parts of the International Financial Services Centre.

Mayor Square - NCI is served by Dublin Bus routes 33D, 33X, 142, 151, G1 and G2.
