= Cheeverstown Luas stop =

Tram stop in Dublin, Ireland

Cheeverstown Baile an tSíbhrigh
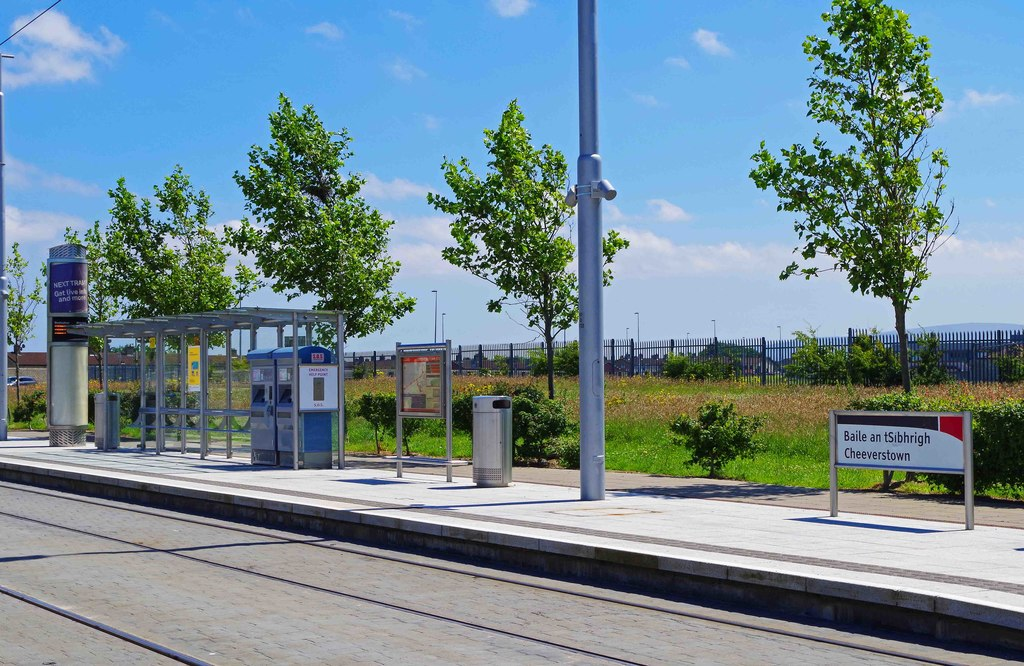
- Cheeverstown Luas stop, Cheeverstown Road

General information
- Location: Dublin; Ireland
- Coordinates: 53°17′28″N 6°24′25″W
- Owner: Transport Infrastructure Ireland
- Operator: Luas
- Line: Red
- Platforms: 2
- Bus routes: 1
- Bus stands: 1
- Bus operators: Go-Ahead Ireland
- Connections: W4

Construction
- Structure type: At-grade

Other information
- Fare zone: Red 4

Key dates
- 2 July 2011: Station opened

Services
Preceding station	Luas	Following station
Citywest Campus towards Saggart	Red Line	Fettercairn towards The Point or Connolly
Location
- Location within Dublin

Cheeverstown (Irish: Baile an tSíbhrigh) is a stop on the Luas light-rail tram system in Dublin, Ireland. It opened in 2011 as a stop on the extension of the Red Line to Saggart. The stop is located on a section of reserved track at the side of Katherine Tynan Road in the Cheeverstown area of south-west Dublin. The stop has a park and ride facility with 312 spaces.
