= George's Dock Luas stop =

Tram stop in Dublin, Ireland

George's Dock Duga Sheoirse
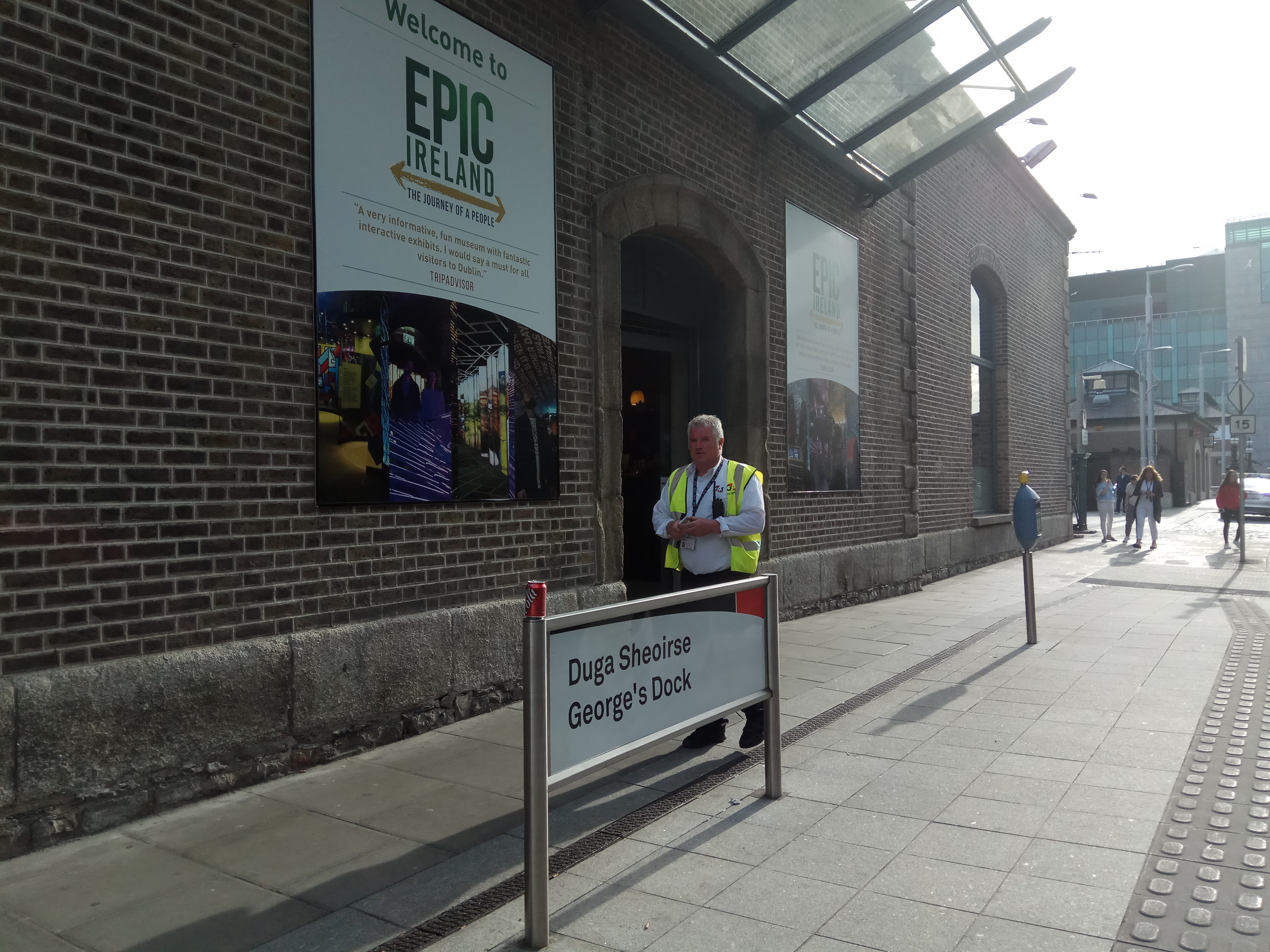
- The westbound platform at George's Dock

General information
- Location: Dublin; Ireland
- Coordinates: 53°20′58″N 6°14′51″W
- Owner: Transport Infrastructure Ireland
- Operator: Luas
- Line: Red
- Platforms: 2

Construction
- Structure type: At-grade

Other information
- Fare zone: Central/Red 1

Key dates
- 8 December 2009: Station opened

Services
Preceding station	Luas	Following station
Busáras towards Tallaght or Saggart	Red Line	Mayor Square - NCI towards The Point
Location
- Location within Central Dublin

George's Dock (Irish: Duga Sheoirse) is a stop on the Luas light-rail tram system in Dublin, Ireland. It opened in 2009 as one of four stops on an extension of the Red Line through the docklands to The Point, opposite the main part of Dublin Port. It is located in the middle of George's Dock, a road whose two lanes are shared by cars and trams. The two edge platforms are integrated into the surrounding pavement. To the east of the stop, trams continue along George's Dock and Mayor Street to the Point. To the west, the line merges with the branch to Connolly Station, passing Busáras and through the city centre towards Tallaght and Saggart

George's Dock is served by Dublin Bus routes 33D, 33X, 53, 142 and 151.

The George's Dock bridge to the west of the stop was damaged by fire in August 2025, and Transdev have stated they will rebuild it over the following months.
