= Busáras =

Bus station in Dublin, Ireland

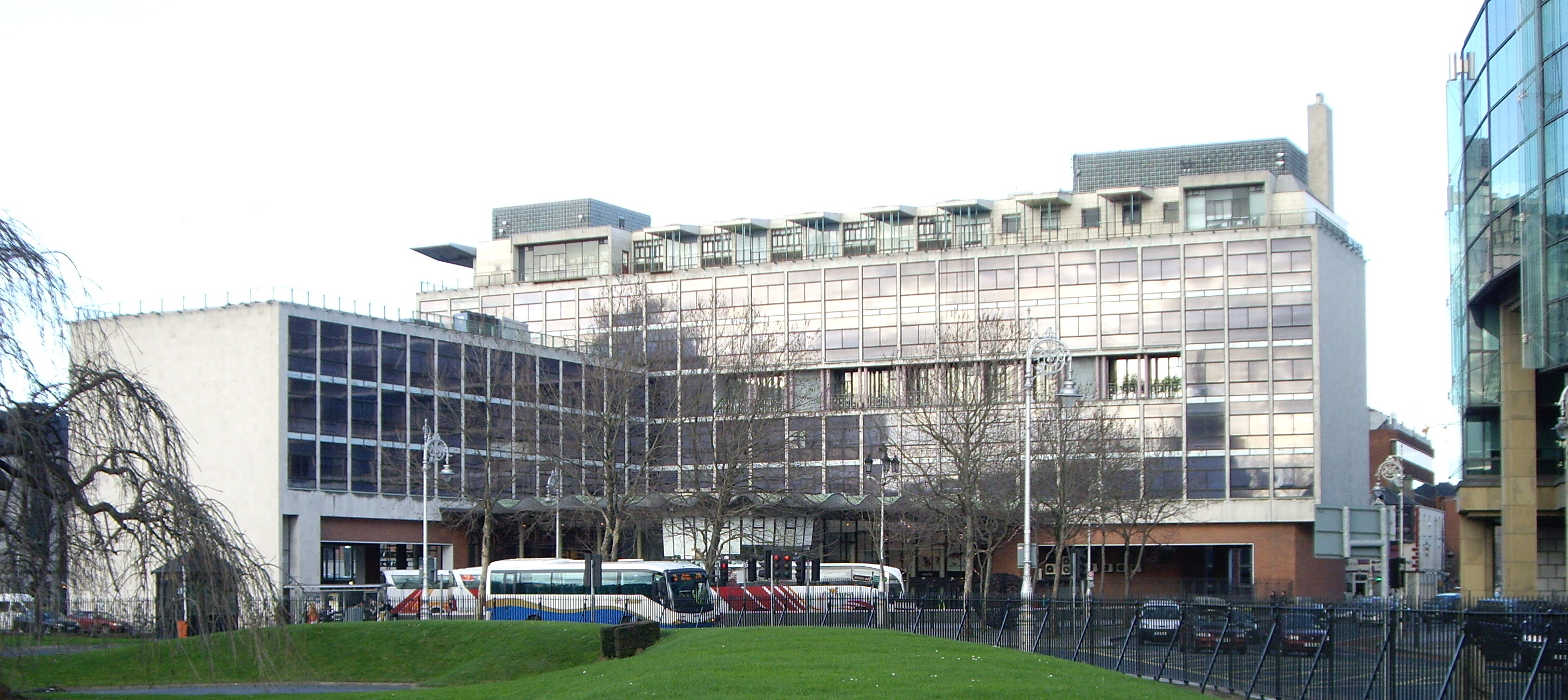
- Busáras in 2008
- Interactive map of the Busáras area

General information
- Architectural style: International Modern
- Location: Store Street, Dublin 1, Ireland
- Coordinates: 53.3499°N 6.2520°W
- Current tenants: Bus Éireann (CIÉ), Department of Social Protection
- Construction started: 1945; 81 years ago
- Completed: 1953; 73 years ago
- Renovated: 2007; 19 years ago
- Cost: IEP 1,000,000
- Renovation cost: €1,700,000
- Owner: Government of Ireland

Design and construction
- Architect: Michael Scott
- Awards: Royal Institute of the Architects of Ireland (RIAI) Triennial gold medal

Renovating team
- Renovating firm: Collen Construction

Busáras (Irish pronunciation: [ˈbˠɔsˠˌaːɾˠəsˠ]; from bus + áras "building") is the central bus station in Dublin, Ireland for Intercity and regional bus services operated by Bus Éireann. Designed in the International Modern style, Busáras is also a stop on the Red Line of the Luas system, in Store Street just before the terminus at Dublin Connolly railway station. Áras Mhic Dhiarmada ("Mac Diarmada House") is the official name of the building, which also includes the headquarters of the Department of Social Protection. CIÉ, parent of Bus Éireann, leases the lower floors from the department. Áras Mhic Dhiarmada is named after Seán Mac Diarmada, a leader of the Easter Rising in 1916.

== History ==
The need for a central bus station in Dublin was identified first by the magazine the Irish Builder and Engineer in 1937, citing the large volume of passengers waiting for buses out of Dublin along the quays without shelter or other facilities. Four potential locations were identified for the new station: Store Street, Aston Quay, Wood Quay, and Haymarket, Smithfield. Due to the location, low cost, and proximity to two roads, the Store Street site was selected by the Irish Omnibus Company. The site was also close to Amiens Street train station, and the ferry terminals at Dublin Port. The Store Street site was placed between the warehouses and stores of the Dublin docklands and the 18th century Custom House. The site was purchased for £13,000.

Michael Scott and his team of young architects and designers were engaged to design the scheme, with discussions beginning in 1944. Initially a circular two-storey building was proposed for the site and with outline planning permission granted on these plans, the stores were demolished. The planned building rose from 2 to 4 storeys, as the newly formed Córas Iompar Éireann (CIÉ) sought to amalgamate all of its disparate offices across the city into the one building. The Irish Times featured a photomontage of the proposed new building with the Custom House on its front page. The montage claimed to be drawn from the submitted plans with Dublin Corporation on 3 October 1946. Scott began legal proceedings against the paper, claiming that the montage was libellous due to its misrepresentation of his design. He eventually settled for an apology and costs from the newspaper in April 1947. The prospect of a tall modern building imposed behind the Custom House generated considerable criticism from the public, and led to assurances from the Corporation that advice would be sought on the approval of any plans.

When CIÉ sought planning permission on the new, finalised plans for the bus station the planning committee rejected it by a narrow majority. After an appeal the permission was granted, again by a narrow majority, with conditions that some stylistic changes were made. In this plan, an 8-story block was mounted on a 2-storey bus station podium at the rear of the site, but it was deemed too tall as regards fire safety, and that the tower would impact on the right to light of other buildings on Store Street. This resulted in the lowering of the office block scheme.

Due to financial losses in 1947, CIÉ was unable to continue construction and a new Irish government, led by John A. Costello, halted the project. The new government planned to use any office space for its own uses, rather than allowing CIÉ exclusive claim, as the government was unable to stop the project entirely. After a number of suggestions, in 1949 the proposal was that the offices be taken up by the new Department of Social Welfare and the Tánaiste's office and that an unemployment office for women also be housed on the ground floor. Owing to financial strain, CIÉ sold the building to the Irish state and set about planning a more basic and utilitarian bus station in Smithfield. The Smithfield plans were rejected, and CIÉ was ultimately nationalised, and the planned bus station with office space for government use was approved. Construction on the site remained stopped from 1948 to 1951, leaving a "vast concrete carcass" unfinished with Myles na Gopaleen naming it the "bust station". It was the election of a new Fianna Fáil government in 1951 which had campaigned for the retention of the bus station, that ensured the project was completed for its intended purpose. It was officially opened on 19 October 1953 at a cost of over £1,000,000.

== Architecture ==
The building has an L-shaped plan with two rectilinear blocks of differing heights sitting at right angles, with a circular hall at the ground floor designed in an International Modern style, influenced strongly by Le Corbusier. The British engineer Ove Arup was commissioned to oversee some of the elements of the design, such as the wavy concrete canopy which overhangs the concourse. It was designed to be a multi-functional building, with a restaurant, nightclub, cinema and other services all housed within it. The building incorporated a number of materials to create texture, such as brass, Danish bronze, copper, Portland stone cladding, Irish oak flooring, terrazzo stairways, and mosaics designed by Patrick Scott. Some of this original detailing remains.

It was one of the first modern buildings in Dublin that attempted to integrate art and architecture, utilising elements like glass facades and a pavilionised top storey with a reinforced concrete flat roof, the building won the Royal Institute of the Architects of Ireland Triennial Gold medal in 1955. It was heralded as "Europe’s first postwar office building" by American and British journals. The building has remained popular with architects, but less so with the public.

The Eblana Theatre, originally intended as a newsreel venue, in the basement of the building was used as a theatre venue from 1959 to 1995. The building was featured on the highest value stamp issued in the Architecture definitive postage stamp set issued in 1982 by the P&T, the forerunner of An Post.

== Developments ==
In 2006, Bus Éireann sought planning permission for the €2 million-plus second phase of refurbishment of the building. The proposal involved repairing and cleaning the bronze glazing and brickwork at ground floor level, to be overseen by conservation architects and an expert in bronze. Proposed works on the west-facing entrance lobby included new entrances at both sides, with bronze automatic sliding doors and uplights installed to the underside of the canopy. The refurbishment work was carried out by Collen Construction over a period of seven months and had a contract value of €1.7 million.

== Gallery ==
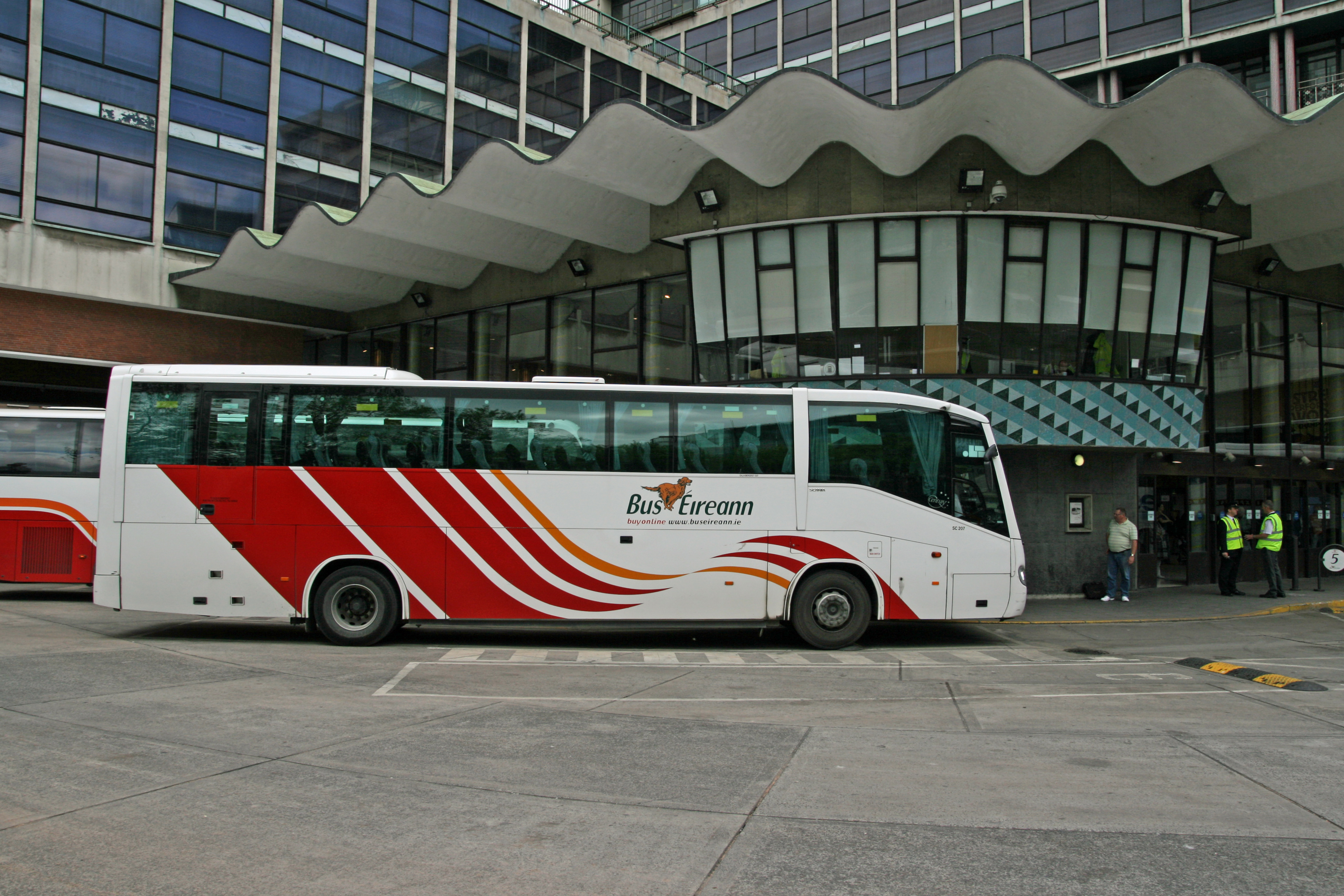
Bus on concourse

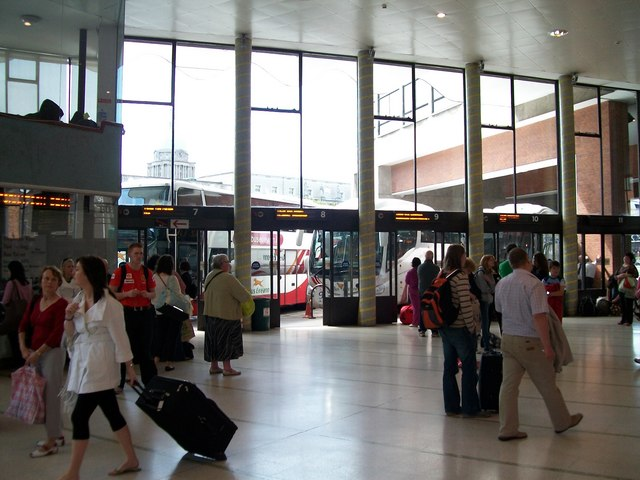
Inside the Station

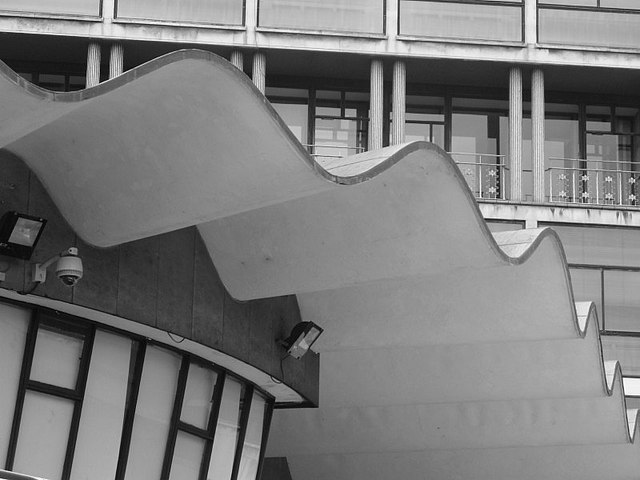
Wavy concrete canopy by Arup

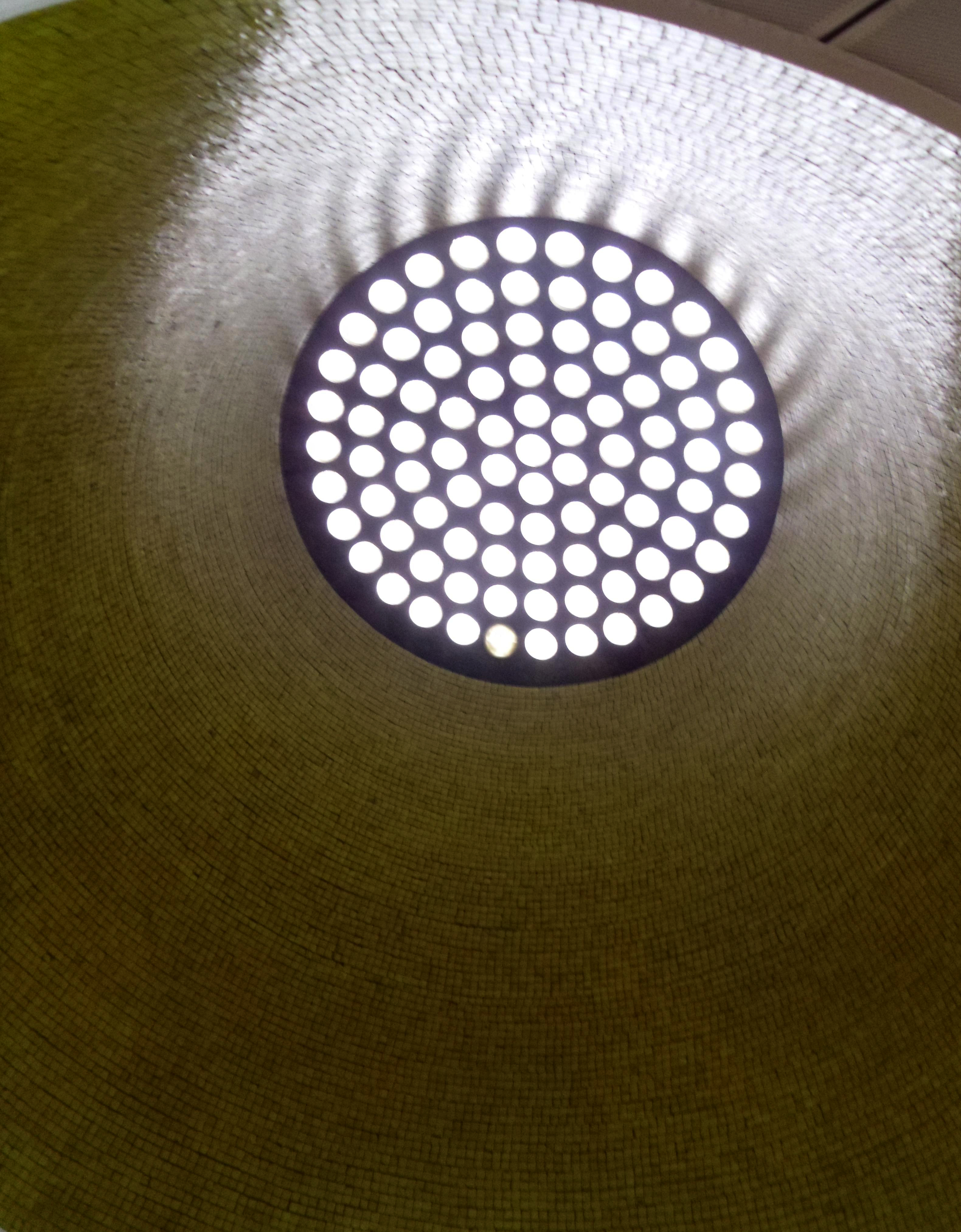
Interior skylight

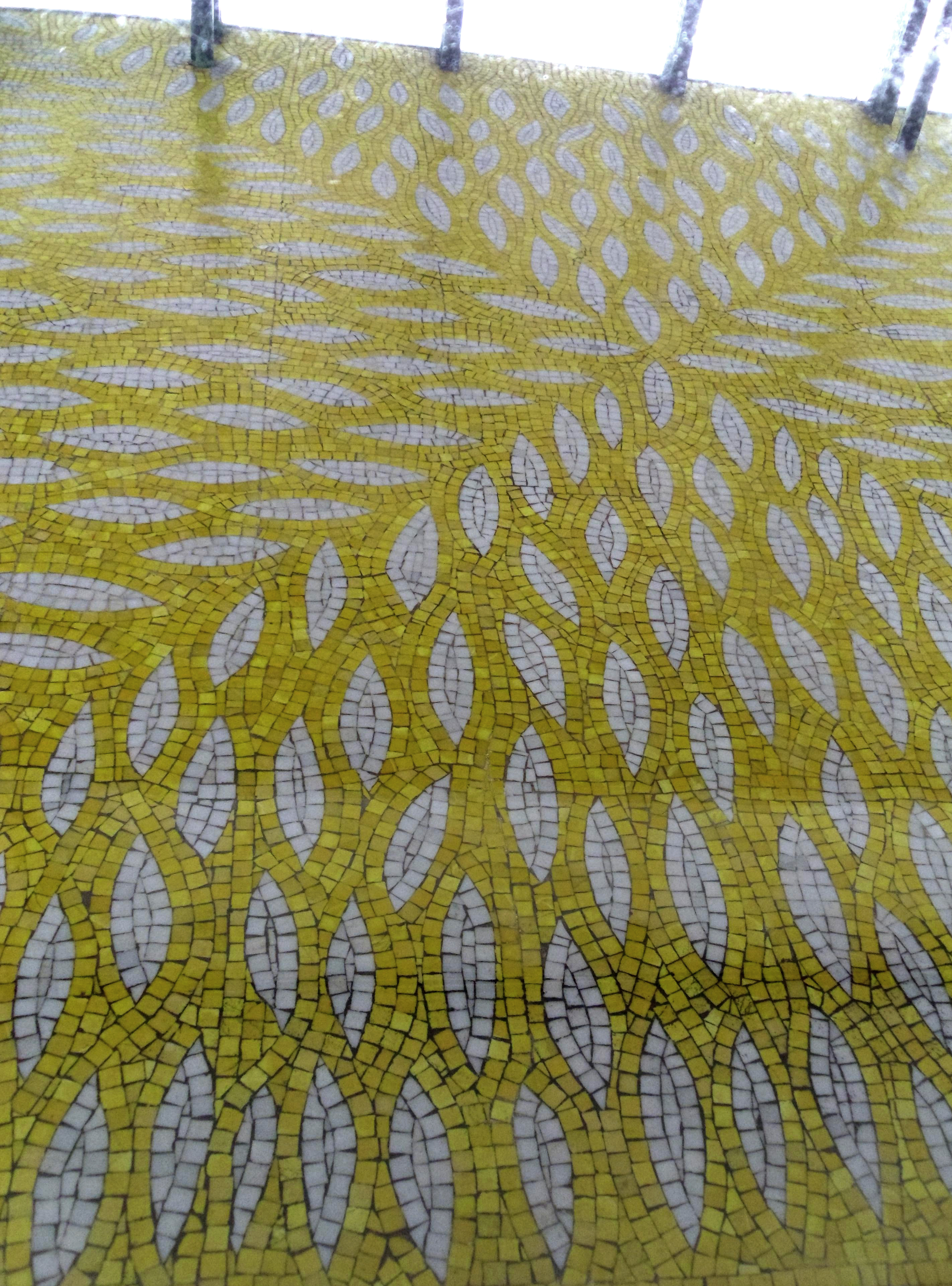
Scott mosaic

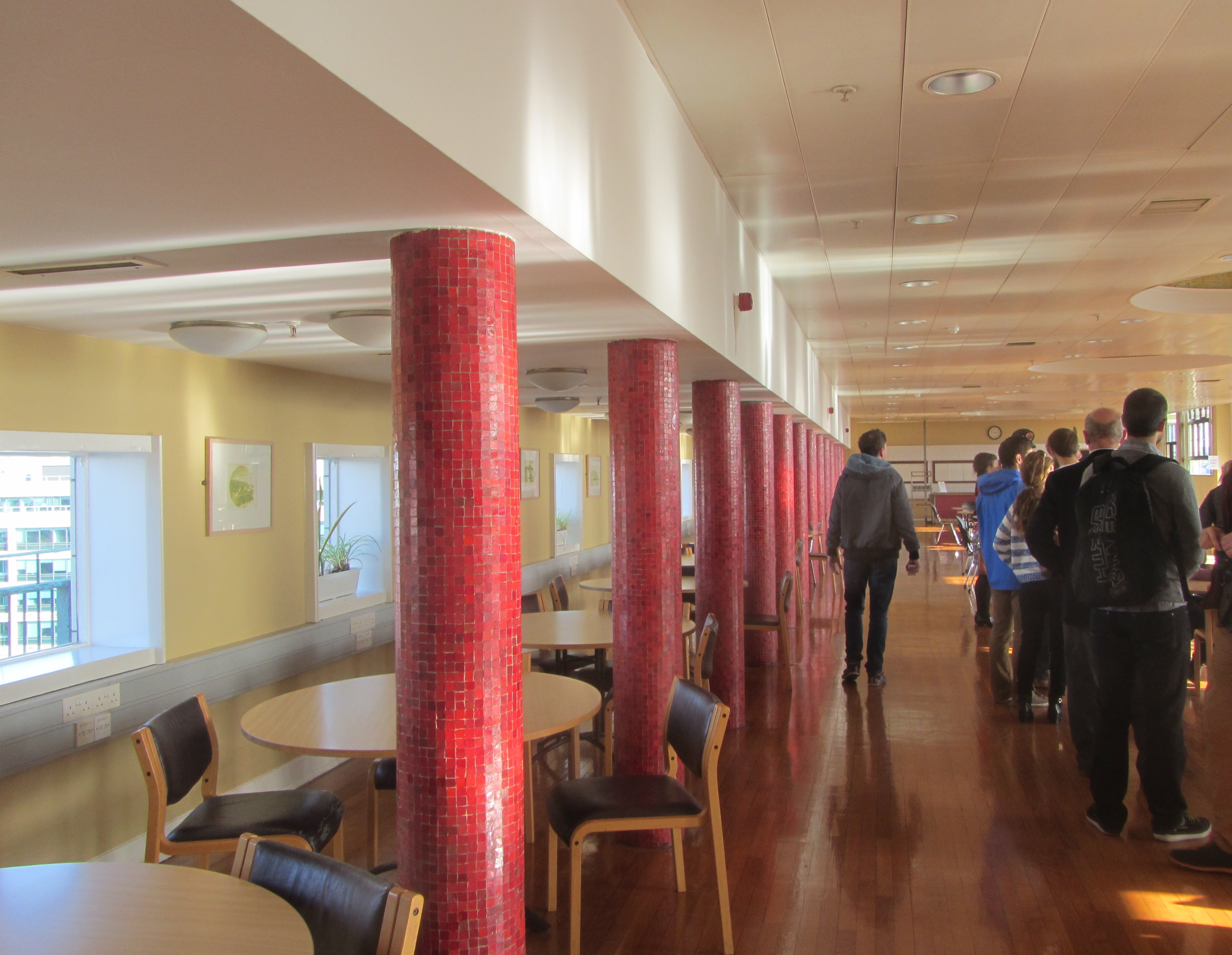
Cafeteria

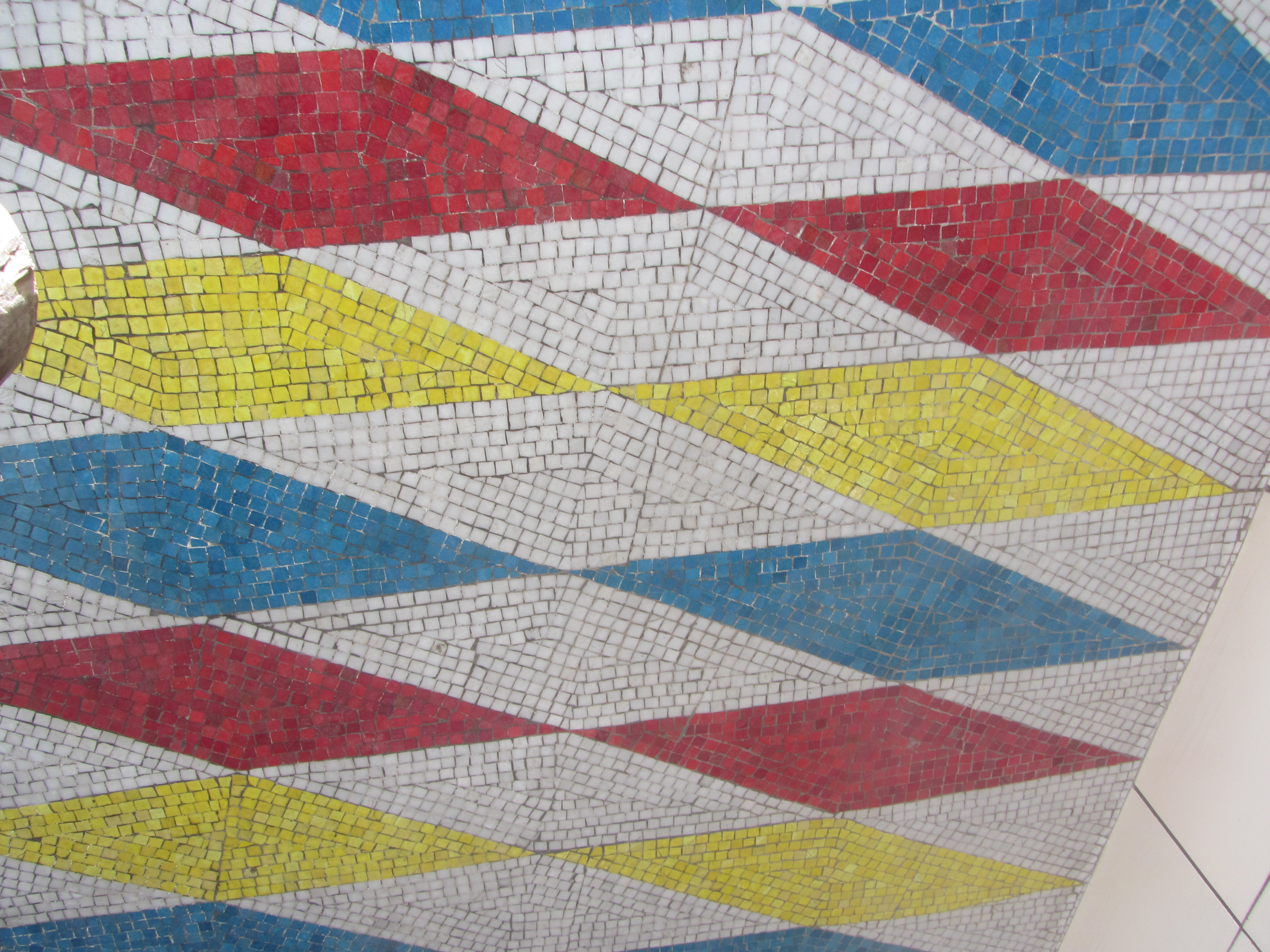
Roof mosaic

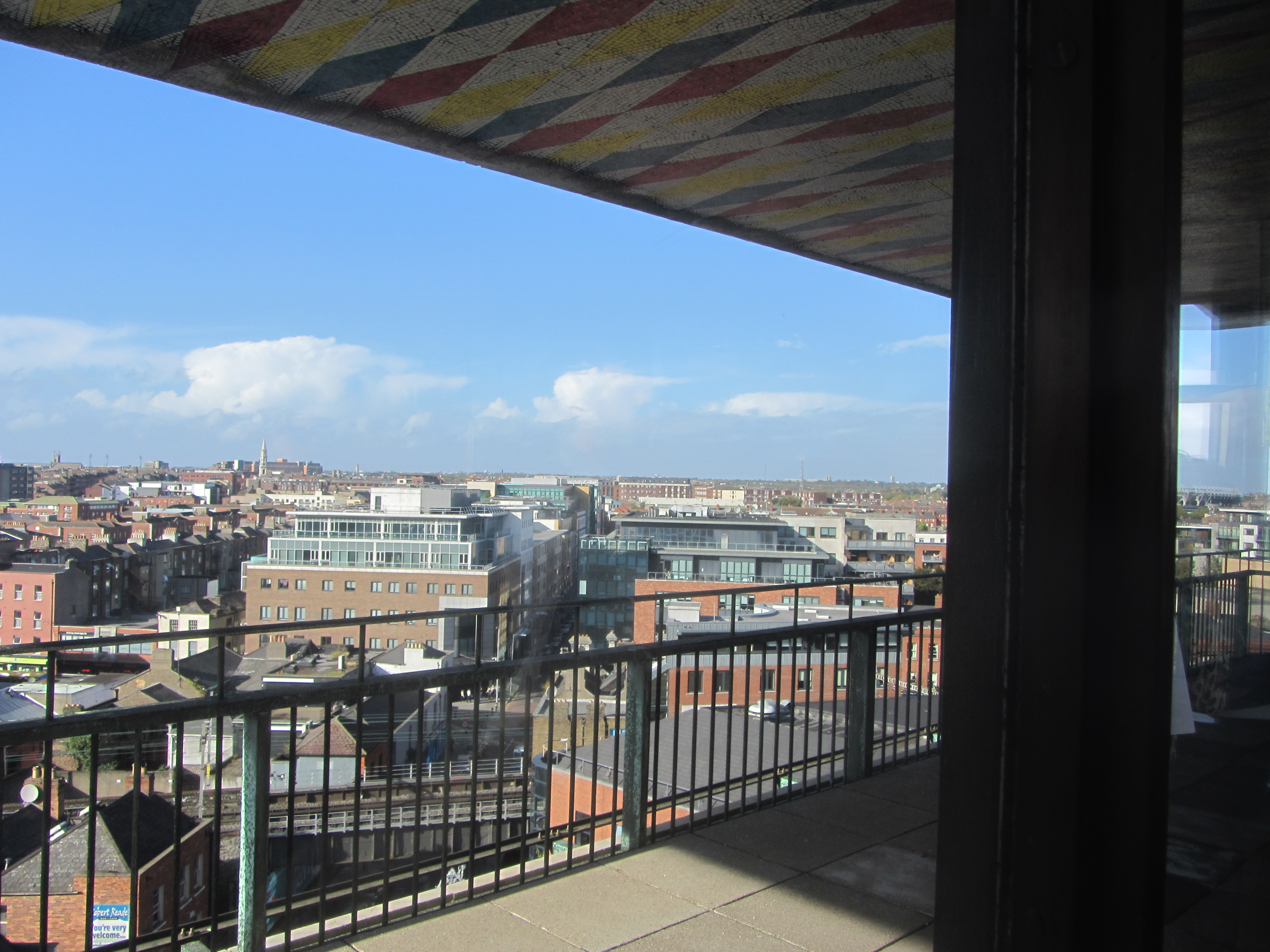
View north from the top floor

== Luas stop ==
Busáras
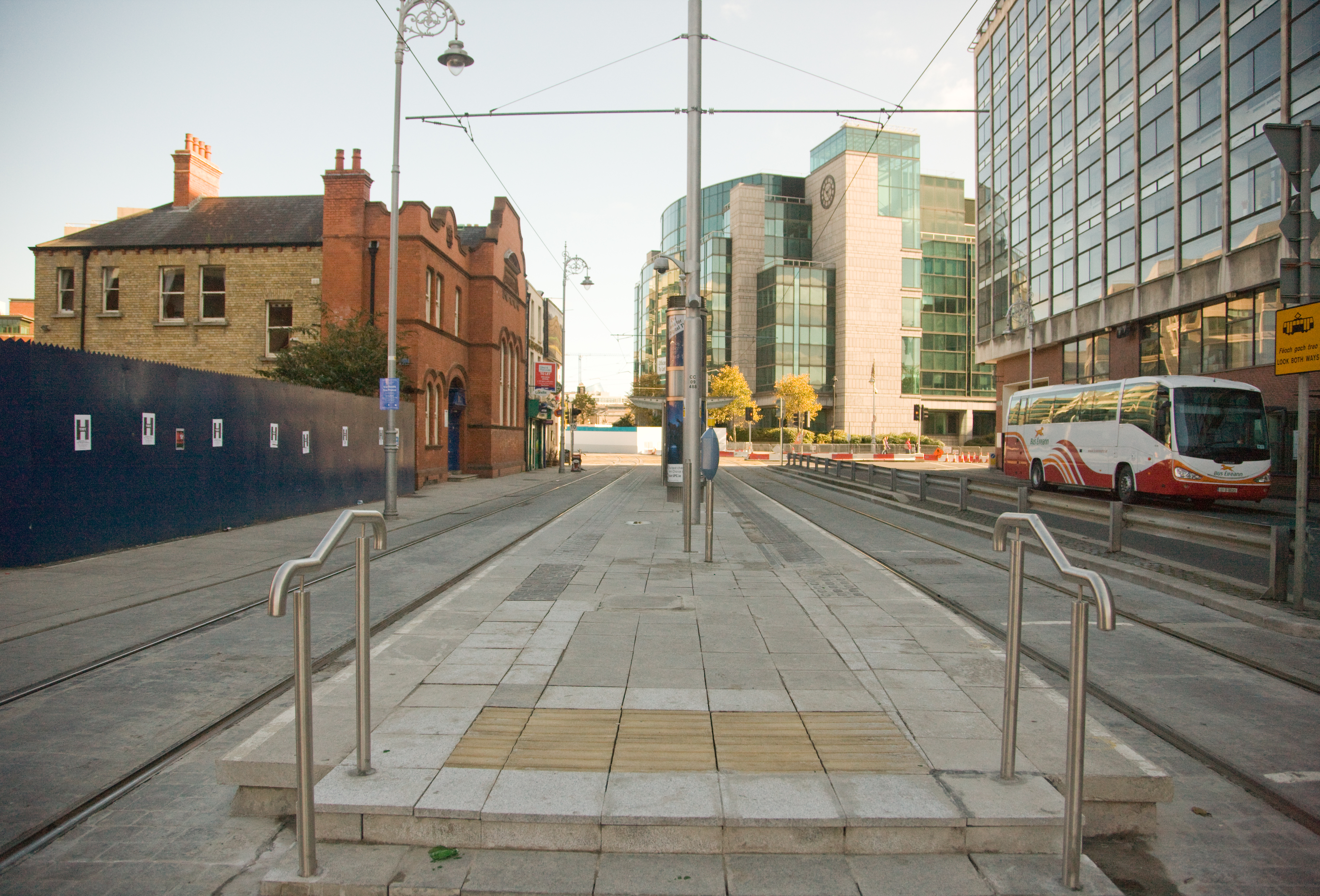
- A view down the platforms at Busáras Luas stop

General information
- Location: Dublin; Republic of Ireland
- Coordinates: 53°21′00″N 6°15′05″W
- Owner: Transport Infrastructure Ireland
- Operator: Transdev (as Luas)
- Line: Red
- Platforms: 2

Construction
- Structure type: At-grade

Other information
- Fare zone: Central/Red 1

History
- Opened: 26 September 2004; 21 years ago

Services
Preceding station	Luas	Following station
Abbey Street towards Saggart or Tallaght	Red Line	Connolly Terminus
Abbey Street towards Saggart or Tallaght	Red Line	George's Dock towards The Point
Location
- Location within Central Dublin

Busáras is served by Dublin's Luas light rail tram system. The Luas stop is located in Store Street, and is one of only three stops on the system with an island platform. When it opened in 2004, it was the penultimate stop on the Red Line for trams travelling north to Station. In 2009, the line was extended and Busáras became the last stop before a junction, with trams either turning left to Connolly or continuing eastwards towards The Point. Passengers at Connolly who wish to board the Luas are encouraged to make the short walk to Busáras, where trams are more frequent.
