= Fettercairn Luas stop =

Tram stop in Dublin, Ireland

Fettercairn Fothair Chardain
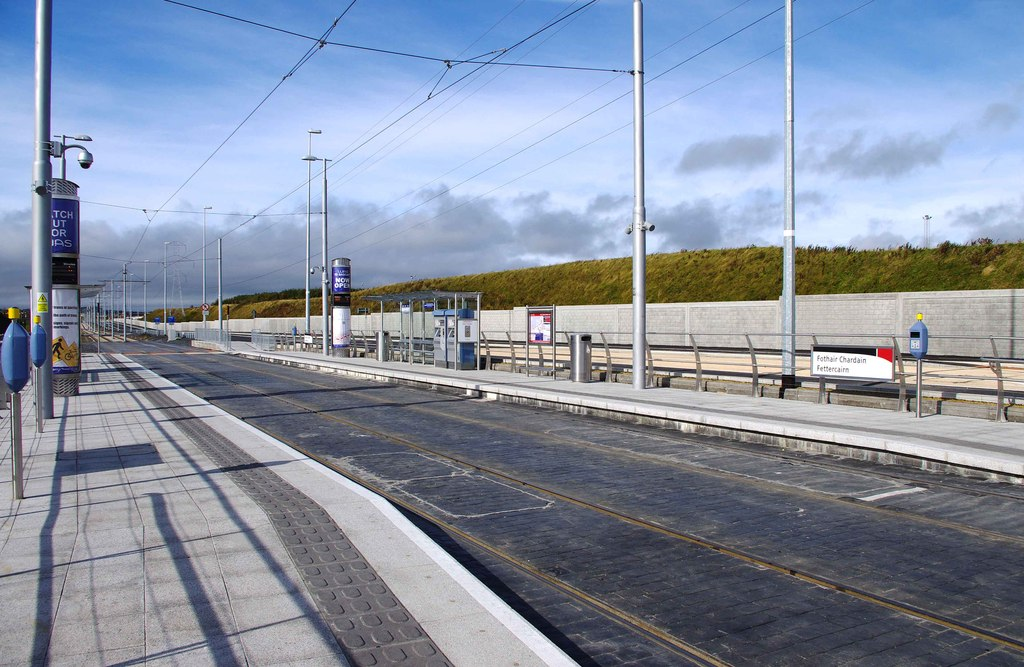
- Fettercairn Luas stop, Fettercairn

General information
- Location: Dublin; Ireland
- Coordinates: 53°17′37″N 6°23′44″W
- Owner: Transport Infrastructure Ireland
- Operator: Luas
- Line: Red
- Platforms: 2

Construction
- Structure type: At-grade

Other information
- Fare zone: Red 4

Key dates
- 2 July 2011: Station opened

Services
Preceding station	Luas	Following station
Cheeverstown towards Saggart	Red Line	Belgard towards The Point or Connolly
Location
- Location within Dublin

Fettercairn (Irish: Fothair Chardain) is a stop on the Luas light-rail tram system in Dublin, Ireland. It opened in 2011 as a stop on the extension of the Red Line to Saggart. The stop is located on a section of reserved track at the side of Katherine Tynan Road in south-west Dublin, between the Fettercairn suburb and Roadstone Quarry.
