= Fortunestown Luas stop =

Tram stop in Dublin, Ireland

Fortunestown Baile Uí Fhoirtcheirn

General information
- Location: Dublin; Ireland
- Coordinates: 53°17′03″N 6°25′29″W
- Owner: Transport Infrastructure Ireland
- Operator: Luas
- Line: Red
- Platforms: 2

Construction
- Structure type: At-grade

Other information
- Fare zone: Red 4

Key dates
- 2 July 2011: Station opened

Services
Preceding station	Luas	Following station
Saggart Terminus	Red Line	Citywest Campus towards The Point or Connolly
Location
- Location within Dublin

Fortunestown (Irish: Baile Uí Fhoirtcheirn) is a stop on the Luas light-rail tram system in Dublin, Ireland. It opened in 2011 as a stop on the extension of the Red Line to Saggart. The stop is located on a section of reserved track next to Citywest Drive in the Citywest development in south-west Dublin which includes a hotel, golf course, shopping centre, and housing. Fortunestown stop provides access to Citywest Shopping Centre.

The closest bus stop is stop 4960, which is served by Dublin Bus routes 65B, 77A and 77X, and by Go-Ahead Ireland routes S8 and W6.
