= National Leprechaun Museum =

Folklore attraction in Dublin

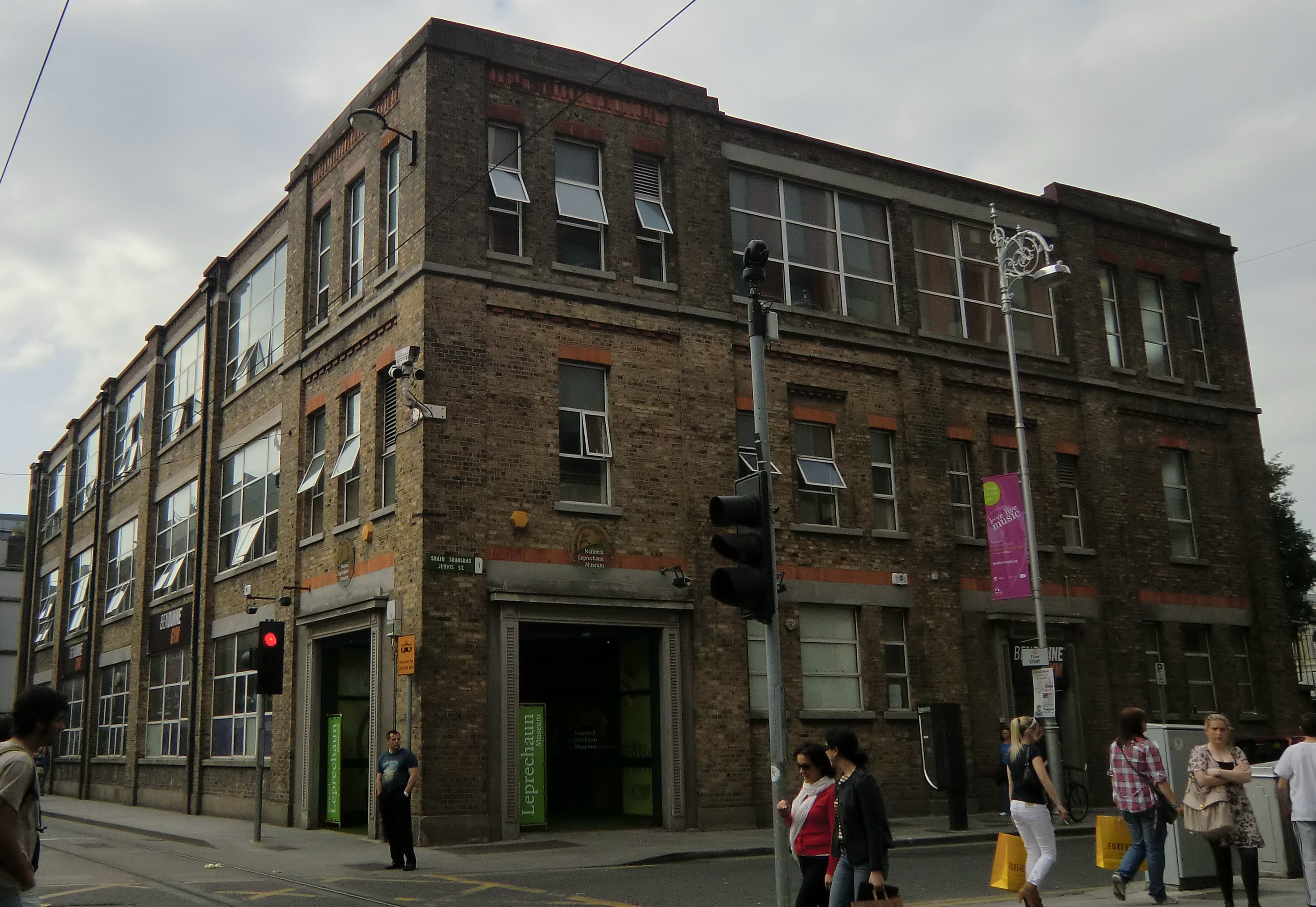

- Location within Central Dublin
- Established: 10 March 2010
- Location: Jervis Street, Dublin, Ireland
- Coordinates: 53.347623°N 6.266632°W
- Type: Leprechaun
- Director: Tom O'Rahilly
- Public transit access: Jervis Luas stop (Red Line)
- Website: leprechaunmuseum.ie

The National Leprechaun Museum is a privately owned museum dedicated to Irish folklore and mythology, through the oral tradition of storytelling. It is located on Jervis Street in Dublin, Ireland, since 10 March 2010. It claims to be the first leprechaun museum in the world.

Tom O'Rahilly designed the museum (with the collaboration of two Italian designers, Elena Micheli and Walter Scipioni) and is its director. O'Rahilly began working on his museum in 2003. He views it as a "story-telling" tourist attraction designed to give visitors "the leprechaun experience" and introduce visitors to Ireland's history of storytelling.

Visitors to the museum follow a guided tour involving several different rooms; each serving as sets for the stories and information. The basics of Leprechaun folklore are explained, including what it is that defines a leprechaun. A history of leprechaun references in popular culture is included, such as Walt Disney's visit to Ireland which led to his 1959 film Darby O'Gill and the Little People. There is a tunnel full of optical illusions, a wooden replica of the Giant's Causeway in County Antrim, Northern Ireland, and a room with oversized items such as furniture to create the effect that the visitor has become smaller in size.

References to other creatures are included in the tour such as the púca, fairies, and banshee, among others. The museum also has a souvenir shop.

The National Leprechaun Museum has received mixed reception. In 2010, The Irish Times referred to it as the "Louvre of leprechauns". In 2024, however, the website solitaired.com published a list of the 100 "most boring" tourist attractions on earth based on data from over 66 million Google reviews, with the National Leprechaun Museum ranking in 38th place. It was the only attraction in Ireland to feature on the list, causing media to describe it as "Ireland's most boring tourist attraction".
