= Red Line (Luas) =

Tram line in Dublin

Luas Red Line
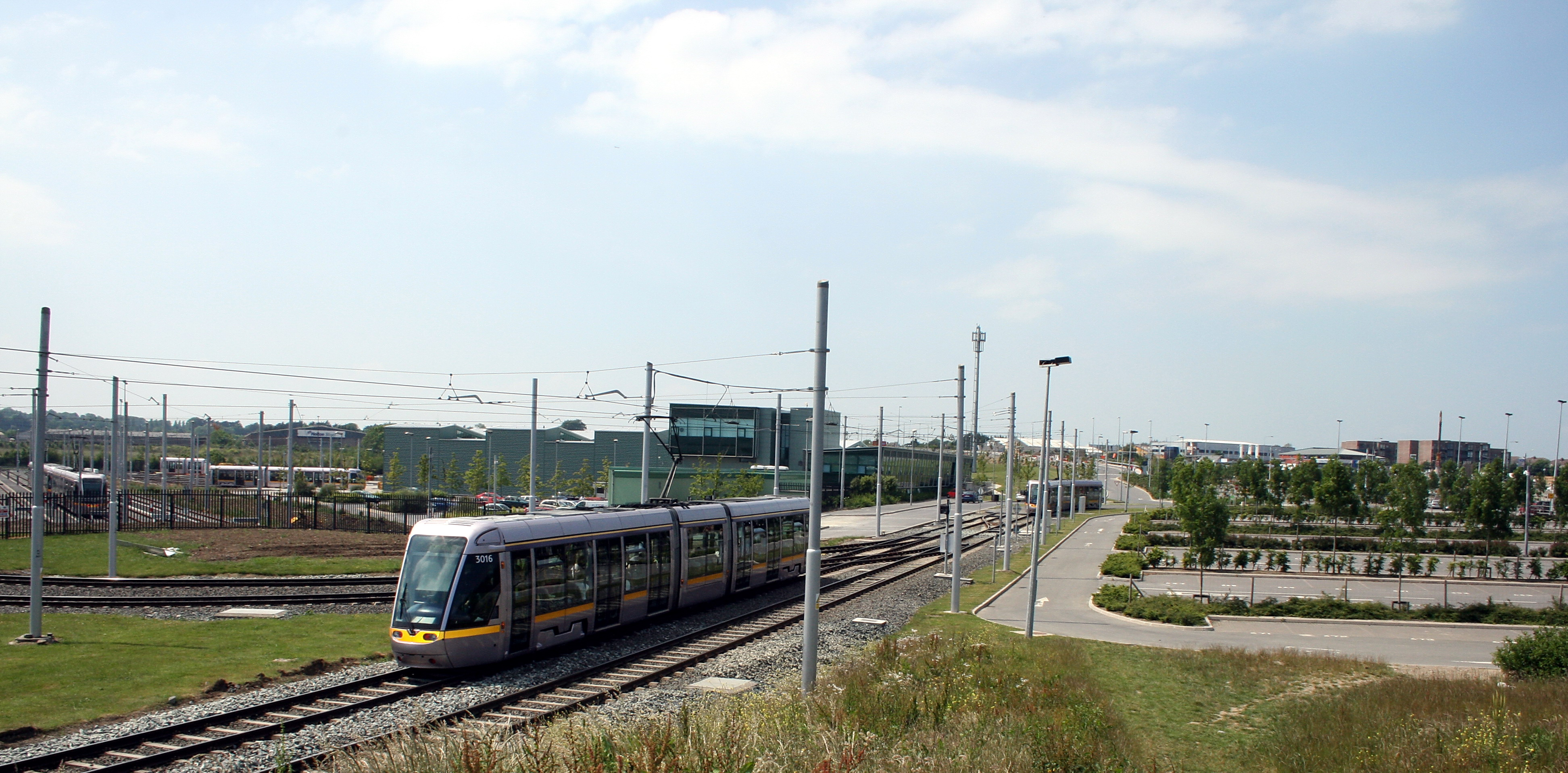
- Luas Red Line tram passes Red Cow depot

Overview
- Native name: Líne Dhearg
- Status: Operational
- Owner: Transport Infrastructure Ireland
- Locale: Ireland
- Termini: Point Village Dublin Connolly; Saggart Tallaght
- Stations: 32

Service
- Type: Light rail
- Operator: Transdev
- Depot: Red Cow
- Rolling stock: Alstom Citadis 401

History
- Opened: 26 September 2004

Technical
- Line length: 13 miles (21 km)
- Num of tracks: Double track
- Character: Primary
- Track gauge: 1,435 mm (4 ft 8 1/2 in) standard gauge
- Electrification: 750 V DC Overhead catenary
- Operating speed: 70 km/h (43 mph)

The Red Line (Irish: Líne Dhearg) is one of the two lines of Dublin's Luas light rail system. The Red Line runs in an east–west direction through the city centre, north of the River Liffey, before travelling southwest to Tallaght, with a fork to Citywest and Saggart. The Red Line opened on 26 September 2004.

== History ==
Construction work began in March 2001 on the Tallaght to Connolly line, as well as the Sandyford to St. Stephen's Green section of the second line, with Ansaldo of Italy and MVM of Australia getting the contract to build the system. The St. Stephen's Green to Dublin Airport section was dropped before construction began, as it was decided to serve the area by a metro instead. The contract to maintain operate the system was awarded to Transdev Ireland (formerly known as Connex).

The extension from Connolly to The Point opened in 2009, with the extension from Belgard to Saggart opening in 2011.

Interchange with the Green Line began in December 2017 with its extension crossing the Red Line either side of the Abbey Street stop.

For three months in 2025, the line was curtailed following a fire at George's Dock. The fire, on 18 August, damaged the bridge at George's Dock, and northbound services had to terminate at Connolly station. The line fully reopened on 28 November 2025.

== Rolling stock ==
The Luas Red Line is operated using Citadis trams.

== Depot ==
The tram depot for the Red Line is located at Red Cow where the main control room for the entire Luas system is also located.

== Route ==
Image	Name Name in Irish	Branch	Zone	Location	Transport interchange	Serves
	The Point; Iosta na Rinne	Docklands (Terminus)	Red 1	Mayor Street Upper; 53°20′54″N 6°13′45″W	Dublin Port Dublin Bus routes N4 dublinbikes	3Arena; Point Village
	Spencer Dock; Duga Spencer	Docklands	Red 1	Mayor Street Upper; 53°20′56″N 6°14′14″W	Docklands; Dublin Bus routes dublinbikes	Convention Centre Dublin; Central Bank of Ireland; Dublin Landings
	Mayor Square — NCI; Cearnóg an Mhéara — CNÉ	Docklands	Red 1	Mayor Street Lower; 53°20′57″N 6°14′36″W	Dublin Bus routes dublinbikes	National College of Ireland
	George's Dock; Duga Sheoirse	Docklands	Red 1 / Central	George's Dock; 53°20′58″N 6°14′51″W	Dublin Bus routes dublinbikes	Jeanie Johnston; CHQ Building; EPIC The Irish Emigration Museum; International Financial Services Centre
	Connolly; Conghaile	Connolly (Terminus)	Red 1 / Central	Amiens Street; 53°21′04″N 6°15′00″W	Dublin Connolly Dublin Bus routes dublinbikes	National College of Ireland
	Busáras	Main line	Red 1 / Central	Store Street; 53°21′00″N 6°15′06″W	Dublin Bus routes Bus Éireann routes dublinbikes	Busáras; Custom House; International Financial Services Centre
	Abbey Street; Sráid na Mainistreach	Main line	Central	Lower Abbey Street; 53°20′55″N 6°15′31″W	Luas Green Line Marlborough southbound (walk 100 m/110 yd); O'Connell - GPO northbound (walk 140 m/150 yd); Dublin Bus routes Dublinbikes	O'Connell Street, O'Connell Bridge, Abbey Street; Abbey Theatre
	Jervis	Main line	Central	Upper Abbey Street; 53°20′52″N 6°15′55″W	Dublin Bus routes 25, 25a, 25b, 25x, 26, 37, 39, 39a, 51d, 51x, 66, 66a, 66b, 66x, 67, 67x, 69, 69x, 70, 79, 79a, 83, 90, 145, 747 Dublinbikes	Henry Street, Parnell Street, Temple Bar, Italian Quarter; Jervis Shopping Centre; St. Mary's Abbey; National Leprechaun Museum
	The Four Courts; Na Ceithre Cúirteanna	Main line	Central	between Greek Street and Church Street; 53°20′49″N 6°16′25″W	Dublin Bus routes 25, 25a, 25b, 25x, 26, 37, 39, 39a, 51d, 51x, 66, 66a, 66b, 66x, 67, 67x, 70, 79, 79a, 83, 90, 145, 747 Dublinbikes	Four Courts; Wood Quay; DCC Civic Offices; St. Audoen's Church; St. Michan's Church; Chancery House
	Smithfield; Margadh na Feirme	Main line	Central	Phoenix Street North; 53°20′50″N 6°16′41″W	Dublin Bus routes 25, 25a, 25b, 25x, 26, 37, 39, 39a, 51d, 51x, 66, 66a, 66b, 66x, 67, 67x, 69, 69x, 70, 79, 79a, 83, 90, 145, 747 Dublinbikes	Old Jameson Distillery; Smithfield; Light House Cinema; Brown Bag Films
	Museum; Músaem	Main line	Central	Croppies' Acre; 53°20′52″N 6°17′13″W	Dublin Bus routes 25, 25a, 25a, 25x, 26, 51d, 66, 66a, 66b, 66x, 67, 67x, 69, 79, 79a, 90, 145 Dublinbikes	National Museum of Ireland – Decorative Arts and History; Arbour Hill Prison
	Heuston	Main line	Central / Red 2	Dublin Heuston railway station 53°20′48″N 6°17′31″W	Dublin Heuston for mainline services to the South, Southwest, West and Northwest. Dublin Bus routes 25, 25a, 25a, 25x, 26, 51d, 66, 66a, 66b, 66x, 67, 67x, 69, 79, 79a, 90, 145, 747; Bus Éireann: routes 4, X8, 12, X12, 115, 115A, 120, 126 Dublinbikes	St. Patrick's Hospital; Phoenix Park
	James's; Ospidéal San Séamas	Main line	Red 2	James's Street; 53°20′30″N 6°17′36″W	Dublin Bus routes 13, 40, 123 Dublinbikes	National College of Art and Design; St. James's Hospital; Guinness Storehouse
	Fatima	Main line	Red 2	James's Walk; 53°20′18″N 6°17′34″W		Dolphin's Barn, The Coombe; The Liberties; Coombe Women & Infants University Hospital
	Rialto	Main line	Red 2	James's Walk; 53°20′16″N 6°17′51″W	Dublin Bus routes 68, 68a, 122 Go-Ahead Ireland route 17	Rialto, New National Children's Hospital, Kilmainham
	Suir Road; Bóthar na Siúire	Main line	Red 2/3	Davitt Road; 53°20′12″N 6°18′26″W	Dublin Bus routes 68, 68A, 123	Inchicore, Kilmainham; Richmond Park; Good Counsel GAA; Inchicore College of Further Education; Irish Museum of Modern Art; Royal Hospital Kilmainham; Kilmainham Gaol
	Goldenbridge; An Droichead Órga	Main line	Red 3	Davitt Road; 53°20′09″N 6°18′48″W	Dublin Bus route 123	Richmond Park; Inchicore College of Further Education
	Drimnagh; Droimeanach	Main line	Red 3	Davitt Road; 53°20′07″N 6°19′06″W	Dublin Bus route 123	Our Lady's Children's Hospital, Crumlin; Richmond Barracks; Goldenbridge Cemetery
	Blackhorse; An Capall Dubh	Main line	Red 3	Mayor Street Upper; 53°20′03″N 6°19′39″W	Dublin Bus routes 13, 68, 69	Goldenbridge Industrial Estate; Lansdowne Valley Park; Westlink Industrial Estate
	Bluebell; An Cloigín Gorm	Main line	Red 3	Naas Road; 53°19′46″N 6°20′02″W	Dublin Bus routes 13, 68, 69	Drimnagh; Drimnagh Castle; Lansdowne Valley Park
	Kylemore; An Chill Mhór	Main line	Red 3	Naas Road; 53°19′36″N 6°20′38″W	Dublin Bus routes 13, 18, 51x, 68, 69, 69x, 151	Walkinstown; St James Gaels GAA; Kylemore College
	Red Cow; An Bhó Dhearg	Main line	Red 3	Red Cow interchange 53°18′59″N 6°22′13″W	Dublin Bus routes 13, 51x, 68, 69; Bus Éireann route X12; Dublin Coach to Portlaoise / Dublin Airport / Cork	Ballymount Park
	Kingswood; Coill an Rí	Main line	Red 3	R838; 53°18′13″N 6°21′56″W	Dublin Bus route 56a	Tallaght Medical Centre
	Belgard	Main line	Red 3/4	Old Belgard Road; 53°17′57″N 6°22′30″W	Dublin Bus routes 76, 76a	Belgard, Kilnamanagh; Kilnamanagh Shopping Centre
	Fettercairn; Fothair Chardain	Saggart line	Red 4	Katherine Tynan Road; 53°17′36″N 6°23′45″W	Dublin Bus route 56a	Fettercairn; St Marks GAA; Saint Anne's School
	Cheeverstown; Baile an tSíbhrigh	Saggart line	Red 4	Cheeverstown; 53°17′28″N 6°24′23″W	Dublin Bus route 27; Luas Park + Ride	Cheeverstown
	Citywest Campus; Campas Gnó Iarthar na Cathrach	Saggart line	Red 4	Citywest Avenue; 53°17′18″N 6°25′04″W	Dublin Bus routes 65b, 77a, Go-Ahead Ireland route S8; Luas Park + Ride	Citywest; Citywest Village
	Fortunestown - Citywest Shopping Centre; Baile Uí Fhoirtcheirn	Saggart line	Red 4	Citywest Drive; 53°17′03″N 6°25′29″W	Dublin Bus routes 65b, 77a Go-Ahead Ireland route S8; Luas Park + Ride	Fortunestown; Citywest; Citywest Shopping Centre
	Saggart; Teach Sagard	Saggart line (Terminus)	Red 4	Saggart; 53°17′05″N 6°26′16″W	Dublin Bus route 69	Saggart, Whitechurch, Baldonnel, Rathcoole; Citywest Educate Together N.S. Citywest Hotel; Casement Aerodrome
	Cookstown; Baile an Chócaigh	Tallaght line	Red 4	Cookstown Way; 53°17′36″N 6°23′03″W	Dublin Bus routes 56a	Cookstown; St. Mark's Community School
	Hospital; Ospidéal Thamhlachta	Tallaght line	Red 4	Cookstown Way; 53°17′21″N 6°22′44″W		Tallaght University Hospital
	Tallaght; Tamhlacht	Tallaght line (Terminus)	Red 4	Hibernian Industrial Estate; 53°17′15″N 6°22′28″W	Dublin Bus routes 27, 49, 54a, 56a, 65 Go-Ahead Ireland routes 76, 76a, S8; Luas Park + Ride; Dualway Local Bus Services	Tallaght; Institute of Technology, Tallaght; Tallaght Stadium; Civic Theatre; The Square Shopping Centre

== See also ==
- Green Line
