= Tallaght Luas stop =

Tram stop in Dublin, Ireland

Tallaght Tamhlacht
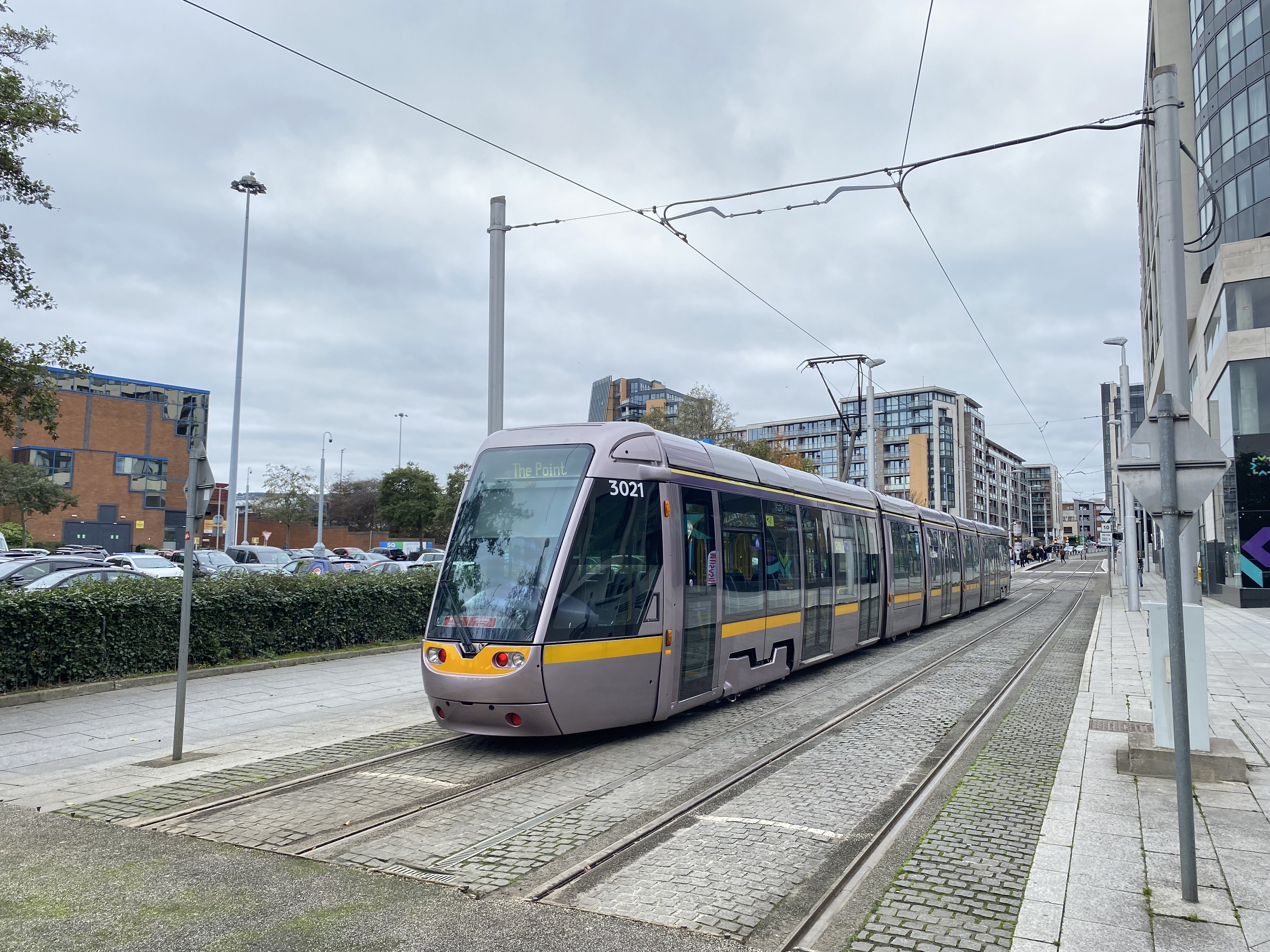
- Tallaght stop

General information
- Location: Hibernian Industrial Estate; Tallaght, County Dublin; Ireland
- Coordinates: 53°17′15″N 6°22′29″W
- Owner: Transport Infrastructure Ireland
- Operator: Transdev (as Luas)
- Line: Red
- Platforms: 2
- Bus routes: 14
- Bus operators: Dublin Bus; Go-Ahead Ireland; TFI Local Link
- Connections: 27; 49N; 56A; 65/A; 77A; 77N; 82; F1; S6; S8; SD3/4; W2; W4; W6

Construction
- Structure type: At-grade

Other information
- Fare zone: Red 4

History
- Opened: 26 September 2004; 21 years ago
Location
- Location within Dublin

Tallaght (/ˈtælə/; Irish: Tamhlacht) is a stop on the Luas light-rail tram system in Dublin, Ireland. It opened in 2004 as the terminus of the Red Line.

== Location and access ==
The stop is located on a section of reserved track at the side of the road the populous suburb of Tallaght, opposite The Square Shopping Centre. It also provides access to Tallaght Stadium, the offices of South Dublin County Council, and the local campus of the Technological University Dublin. The stop has two edge platforms, and trams reverse using a double crossover immediately beyond the stop. Thus, one platform is used for arrivals and one for departures. Upon leaving Tallaght, trams travel along their own right of way, rounding a corner where the tracks are straddled by buildings. They then head north on their way to Connolly or The Point.

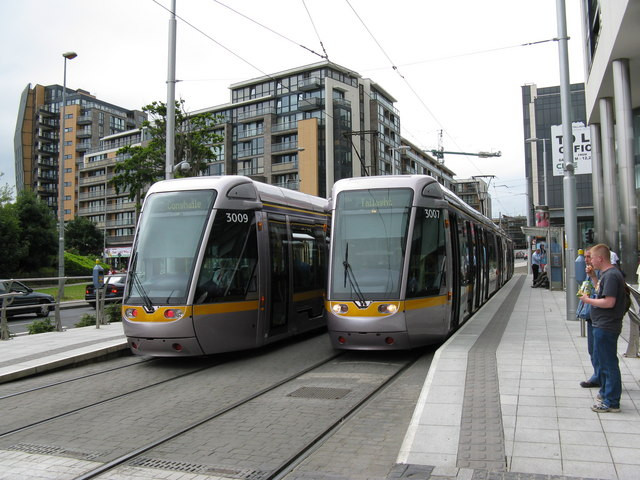
Two trams wait at the terminus

== Services ==
Trams stop at the stop coming from either end every 2-10 minutes.

Preceding station	Luas	Following station
Cookstown towards Tallaght	Red Line	Kingswood towards The Point or Connolly
Fettercairn towards Saggart	Red Line	Kingswood towards The Point or Connolly
