= Saggart Luas stop =

Tram stop in Dublin, Ireland

Saggart Teach Sagard
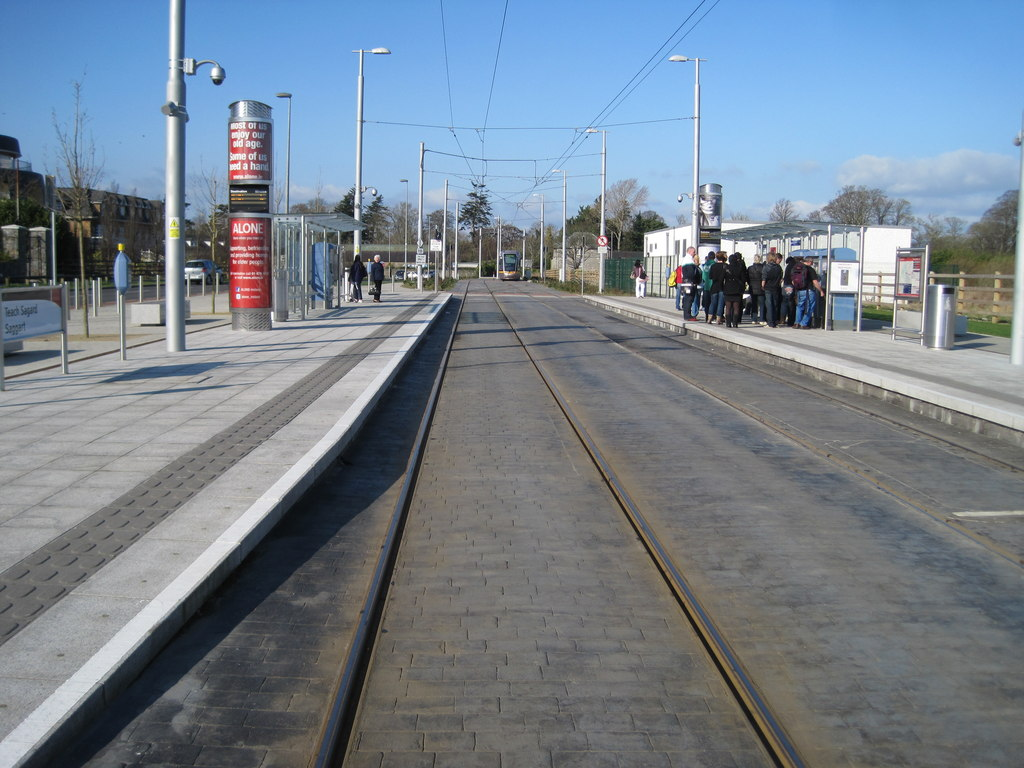
- Saggart is the terminus on the Luas red line

General information
- Location: Dublin; Ireland
- Coordinates: 53°17′05″N 6°26′16″W
- Owner: Transport Infrastructure Ireland
- Operator: Luas
- Line: Red
- Platforms: 2

Construction
- Structure type: At-grade

Other information
- Fare zone: Red 4

Key dates
- 2 July 2011: Station opened

Services
| Preceding station | Luas | Following station |
|---|---|---|
| Terminus | Red Line | Fortunestown towards The Point or Connolly |
Location
- Location within Dublin

Saggart (Irish: Teach Sagard) is a stop on the Luas light-rail tram system in Dublin, Ireland. It opened in 2011 as the terminus of an extension of the Red Line. The stop is located on a section of reserved track next to Citywest Drive near Saggart village in south-west Dublin. It is also close to Whitechurch and Baldonnel. To the north of the stop, a large area has been set aside for a development called Parklands, which is planned to include over 150 houses, two new schools, retail and a large sports area. As of 2020, development has begun onsite.

Saggart has a similar layout to Tallaght Luas stop: there are two edge platforms, beyond which the track continues for around 80m where there is a double crossover. One platform is used for arrivals and one for departures.

The nearest bus stop is stop 3456, which is served by routes 69 and W62 (operated by Dublin Bus and Go-Ahead Ireland, respectively).
