= The Point Luas stop =

Tram stop in Dublin, Ireland

The Point Iosta na Rinne
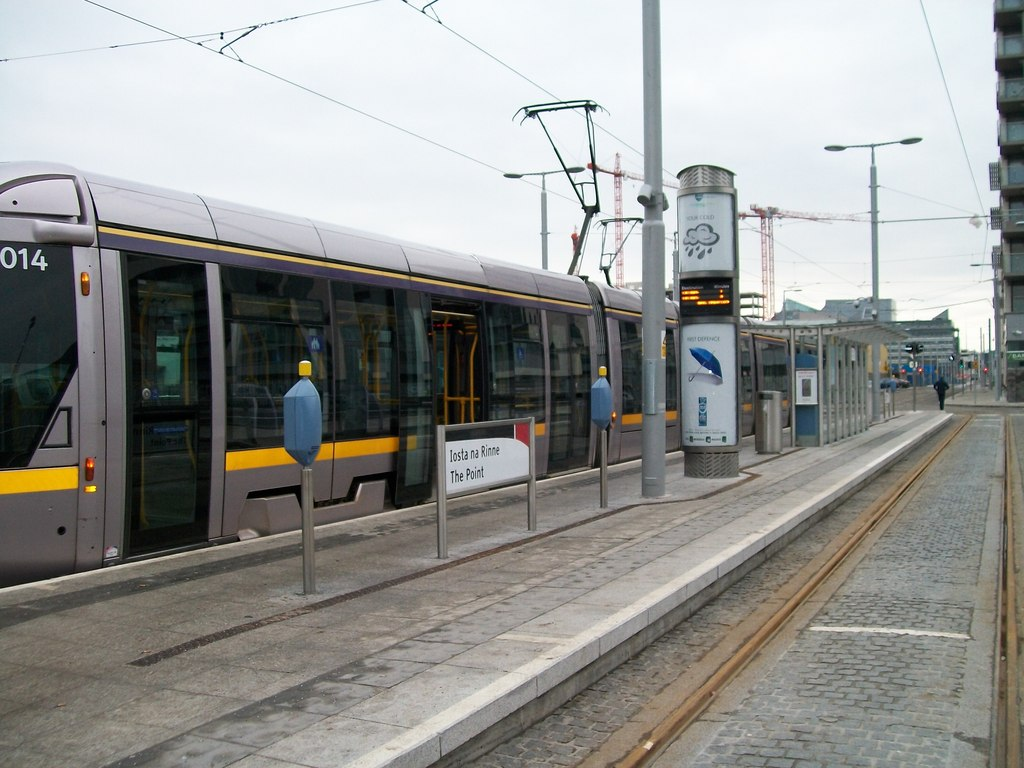
- Luas at The Point

General information
- Location: Mayor Street Upper; Dublin; Ireland
- Coordinates: 53°20′54″N 6°13′45″W
- Owner: Transport Infrastructure Ireland
- Operator: Transdev (as Luas)
- Line: Red
- Platforms: 3
- Bus routes: 27
- Bus operators: Aircoach; Bus Eireann; Collins Coaches; Dublin Bus; Dublin Express; JJ Kavanagh and Sons; Matthews; Swords Express
- Connections: 22; 23; 33D; 33X; 41X; 100X; 101X; 109A; 142; 151; 500; 500N; 500X; 501; 503; 505; 505X; 506; 507; 702; 703; 784; 912; 980A; G1; G2; N4

Construction
- Structure type: At-grade

Other information
- Fare zone: Red 1

Key dates
- 8 December 2009: Stop opened
Location
- Location within Dublin

The Point (Irish: Iosta na Rinne) is a stop on the Luas light-rail tram system in Dublin, Ireland. It opened in 2009 as the terminus of an extension of the Red Line. Named after the nearby Point Depot, it serves the surrounding Point Village area and is situated in the middle of the plaza at the end of Mayor Street Upper, near Point Square, Canvas Point Student accommodation, and the 3Arena.

== Services ==
The stop has three platforms. This allows up to three trams to dwell there during events at the 3Arena, in order to prepare for the influx of passengers leaving the venue at the end of the event. On average, trams depart every 10 minutes towards the city centre and Tallaght or Saggart. Immediately to the west of the stop, the two most northern tracks merge into one and the two remaining tracks cross over at a switch diamond. Trams continue westward along Mayor Street Upper.

Preceding station	Luas	Following station
Spencer Dock towards Tallaght or Saggart	Red Line	Terminus

=== Bus connections ===
The stop is also served by Dublin Bus routes 33D, 33X, 53, 53A, 142 and 151.
