= Dublin Bus =

Public transport operator in Greater Dublin, Ireland

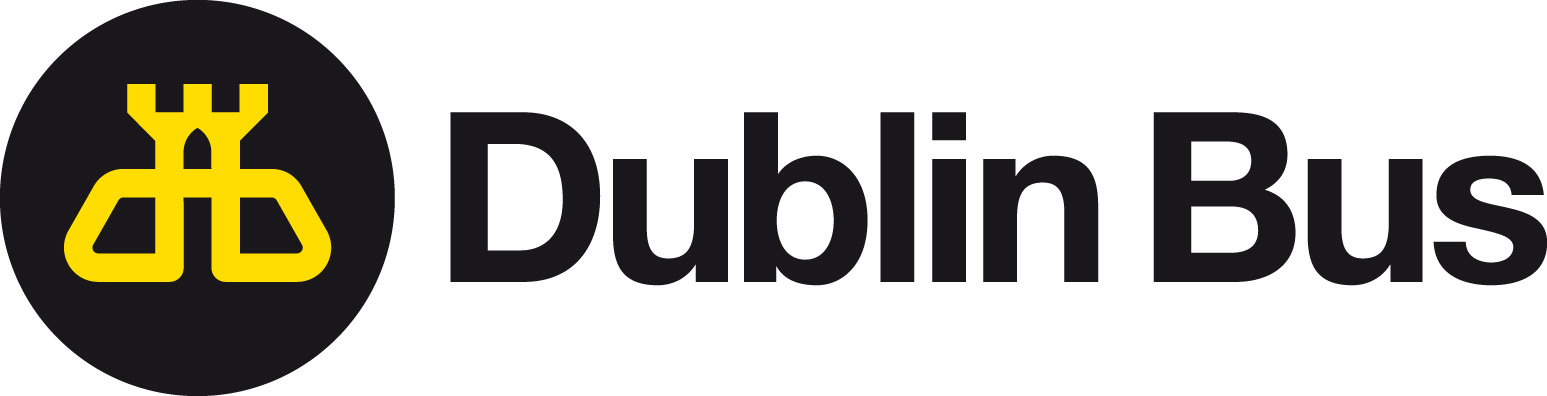

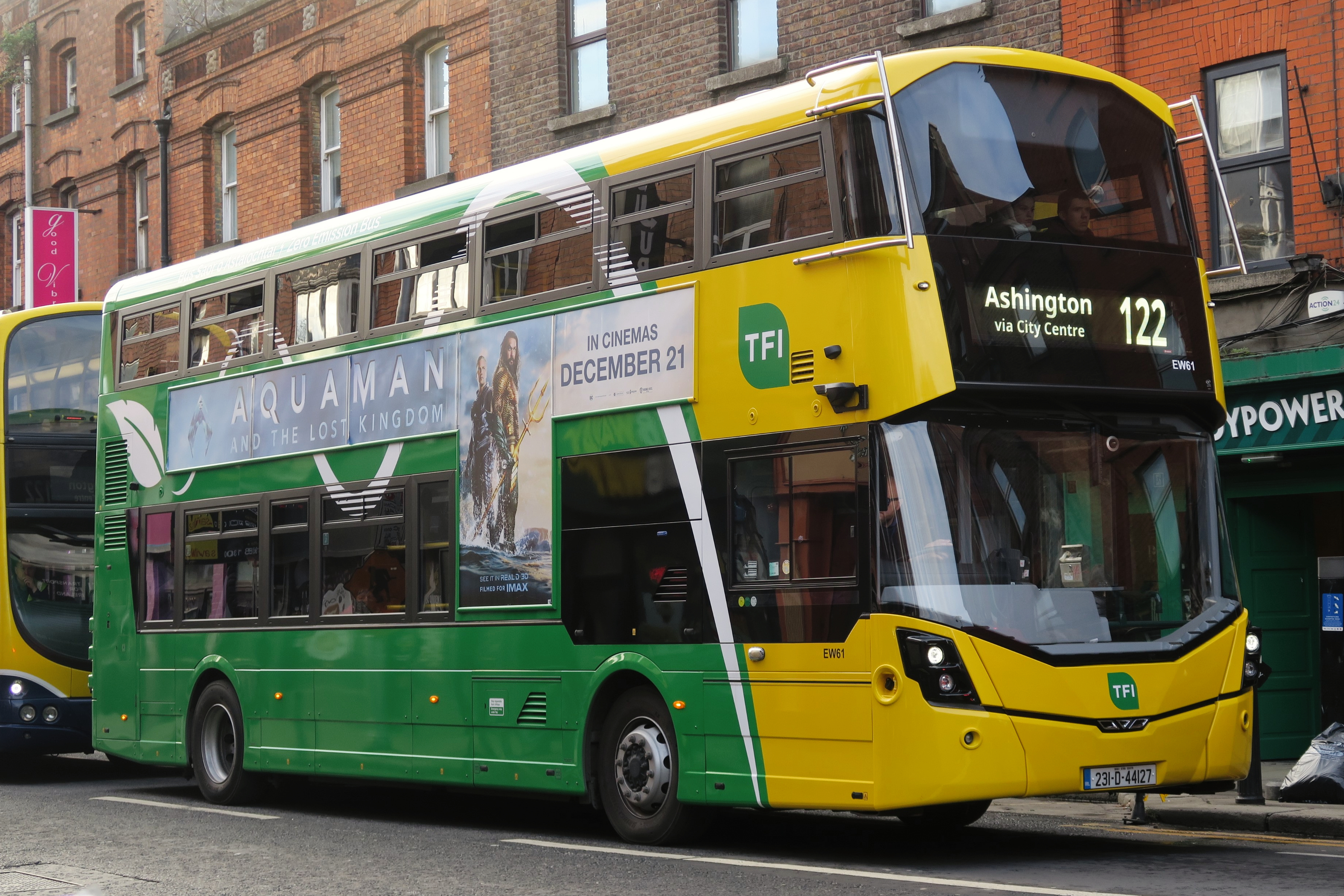
- Wright StreetDeck Electroliner battery electric bus with current Transport for Ireland In 2023
- Parent: Córas Iompair Éireann
- Founded: 2 February 1987; 39 years ago
- Headquarters: O'Connell Street Upper, Dublin
- Service area: Dublin
- Service type: Urban Bus services
- Routes: 120
- Depots: 9
- Fleet: 1,090 (2024)
- Fuel type: Diesel, hybrid, electric
- Chief executive: Billy Hann
- Website: dublinbus.ie

Dublin Bus (Irish: Bus Átha Cliath) is an Irish state-owned bus operator providing services in Dublin. By far the largest bus operator in the city, it carried 145 million passengers in 2023. It is a subsidiary of Córas Iompair Éireann.

== History ==
Original logo from 1987 to 2000

Dublin Bus logo 2000–2007

Dublin Bus was established on 2 February 1987, when Córas Iompair Éireann was split into 3 subsidiaries, Dublin Bus, Bus Éireann and Irish Rail. Dublin's main bus operator was formerly the Dublin United Transport Company. This company was incorporated into CIÉ in 1945.

In September 2011, Dublin Bus received a significant technological upgrade with its introduction of real time passenger information.

== Services ==
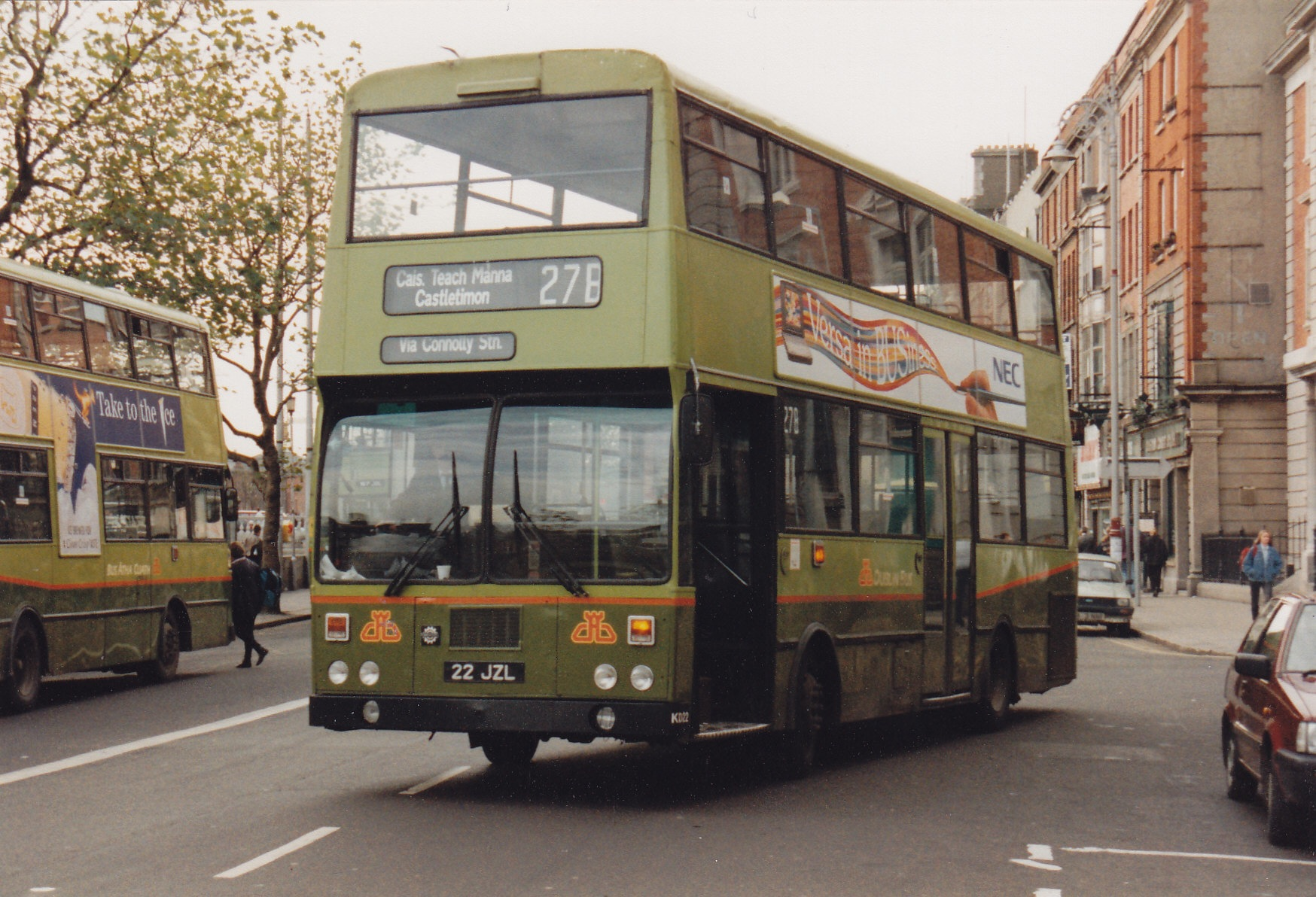
GAC Ireland KD-class double-decker bus in August 1994

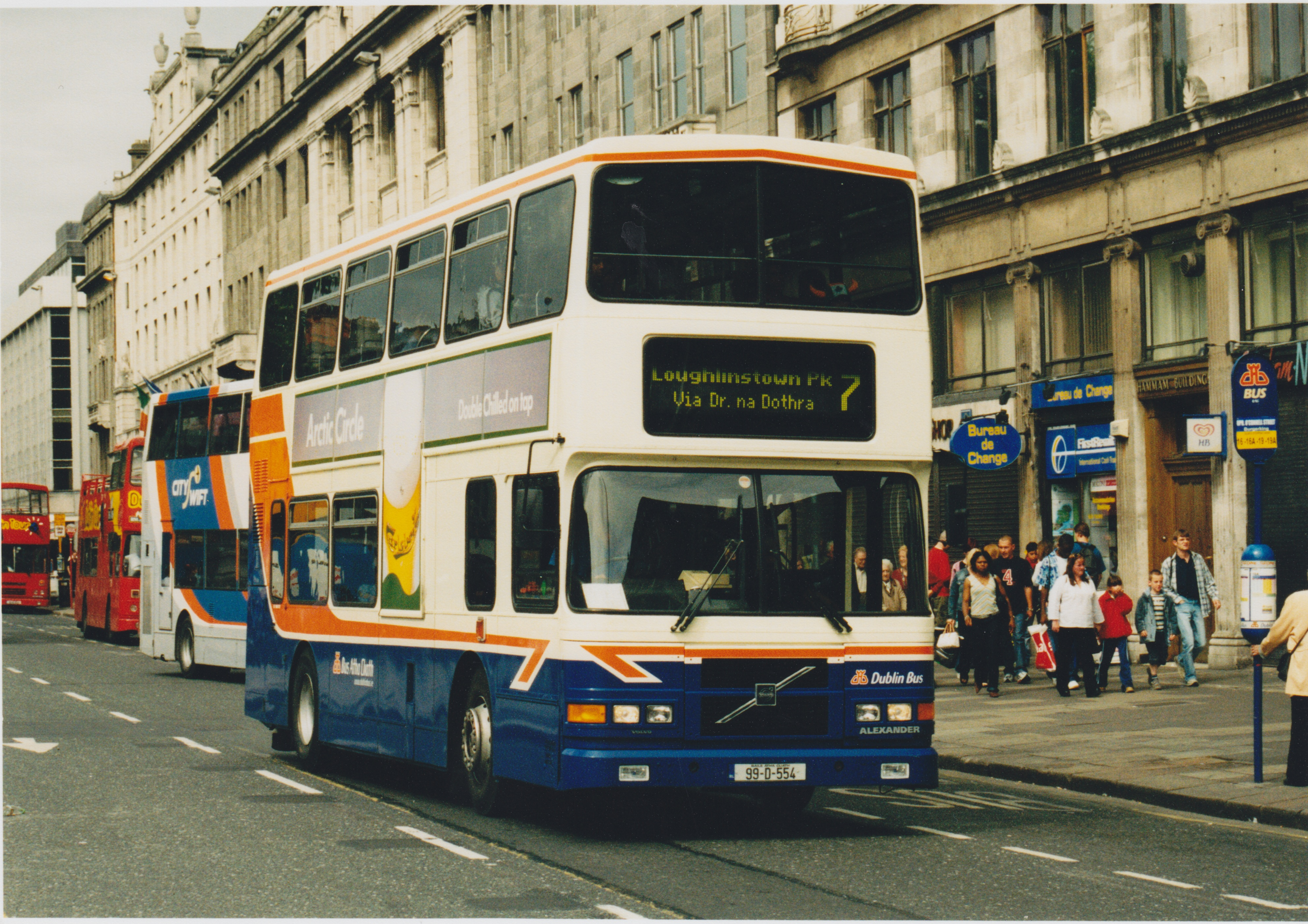
Alexander bodied Volvo Olympian in May 2003

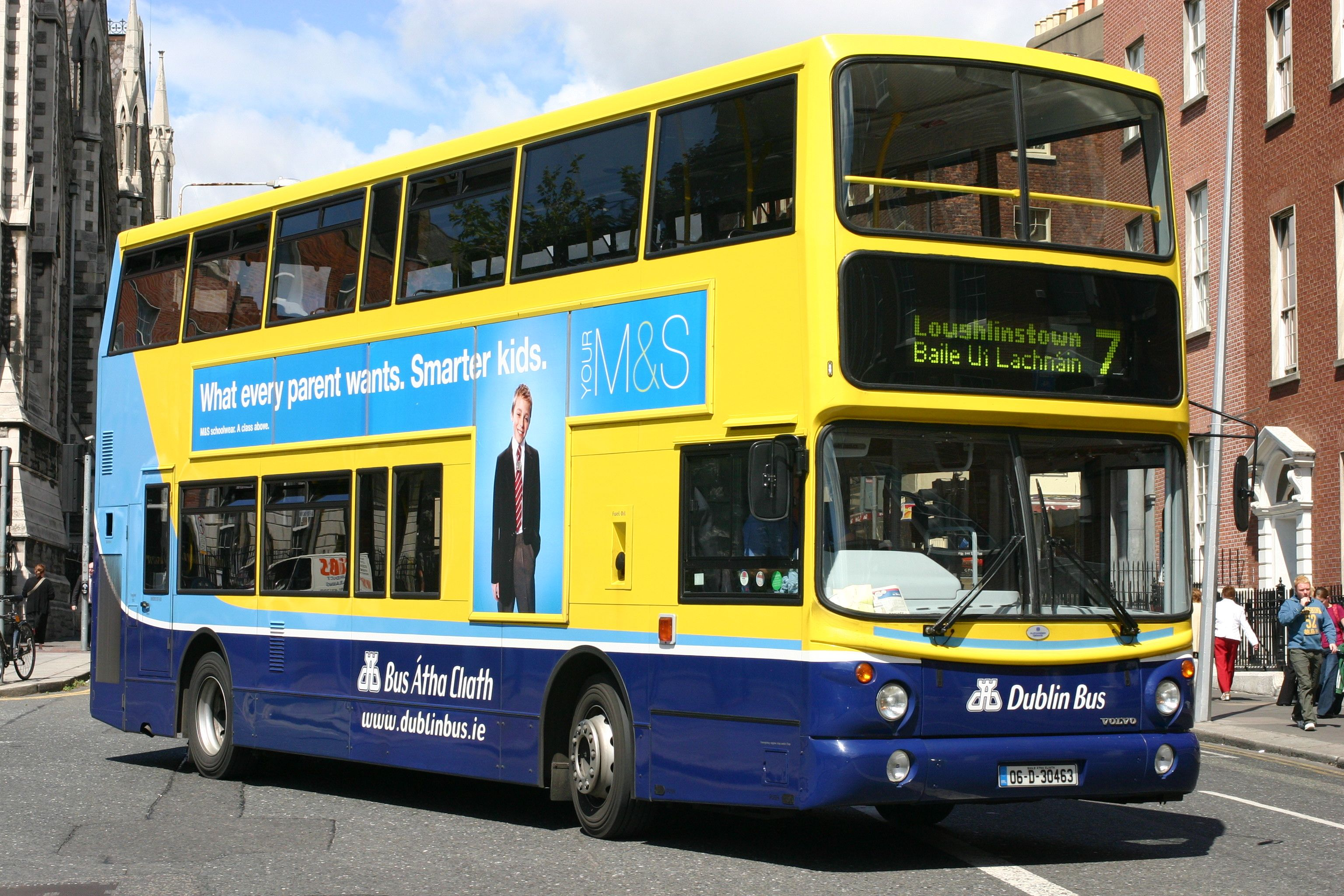
Alexander ALX400 bodied Volvo B7TL in August 2006

Dublin Bus operates an extensive network of 110 radial, cross-city and peripheral routes and 18 nighttime routes in the city of Dublin and the Greater Dublin Area. The company carries around 325,000 people each day. The main radial routes are focused upon Dublin's sixteen Quality Bus Corridors which provide buses with prioritised access, daytime on some routes, 24 hours on others, to the city centre. Express buses (branded "Xpresso") operate on similar routes but have a limited number of stops and a higher minimum fare. These services run Monday to Friday at peak times and do not operate on public holidays; no bus services operate at all on Christmas Day.

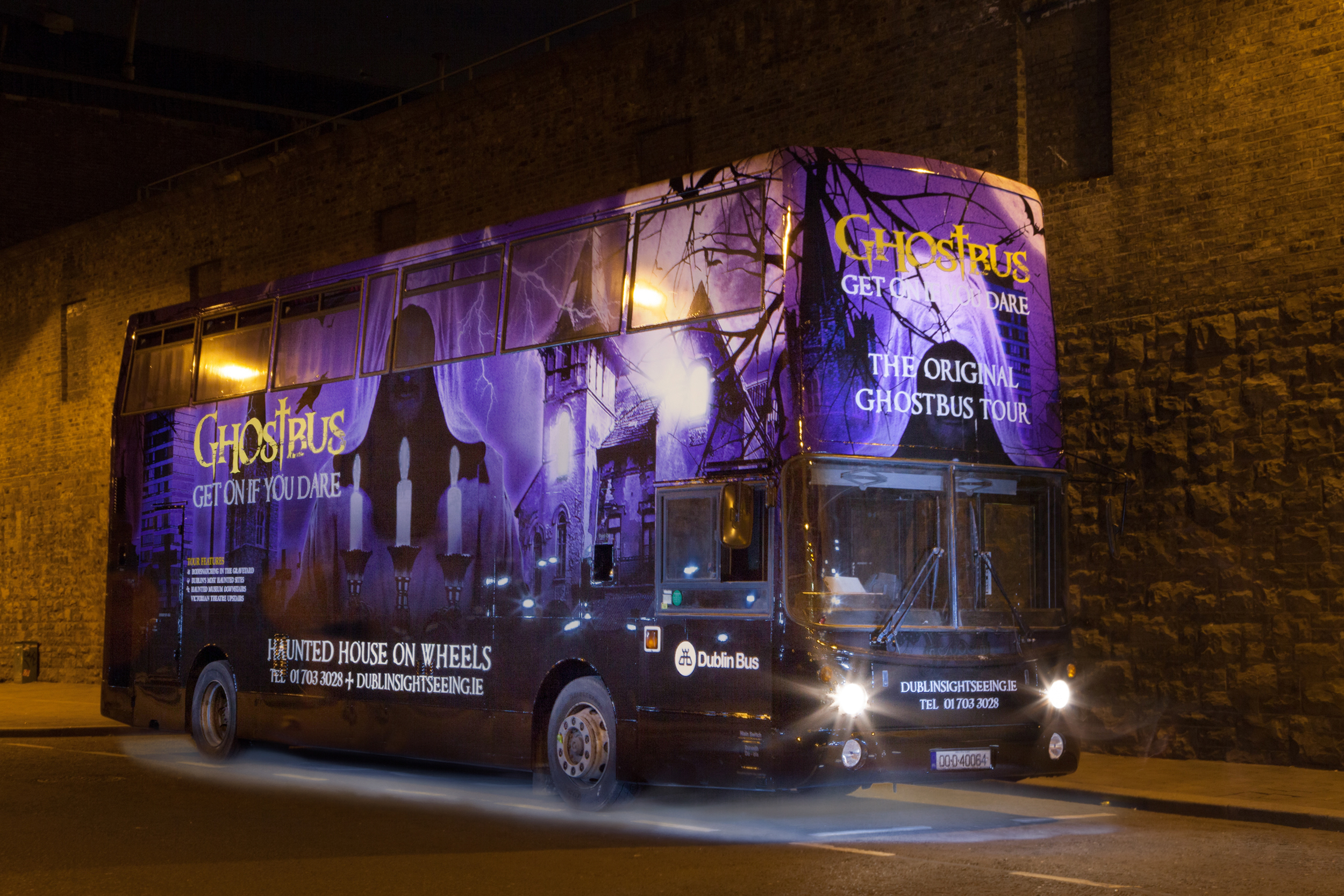
The ghostbus

Dublin Bus also runs a Ghost Bus Tour passing some of the supposedly haunted places in the city including St Kevin's Church and St Audoen's Church. The tour usually runs in the evening time and includes two stops where passengers leave the bus behind and visit locations where ghosts have allegedly been seen. (The term "ghost bus" is also used for the unrelated phenomenon of normal scheduled services that fail to arrive.)

In April 2010, Dublin Bus announced it would be simplifying many of its routes around the city in order to create better efficiency. This programme was called Network Direct. However, as part of these measures, the company also announced that 150 jobs would be lost.

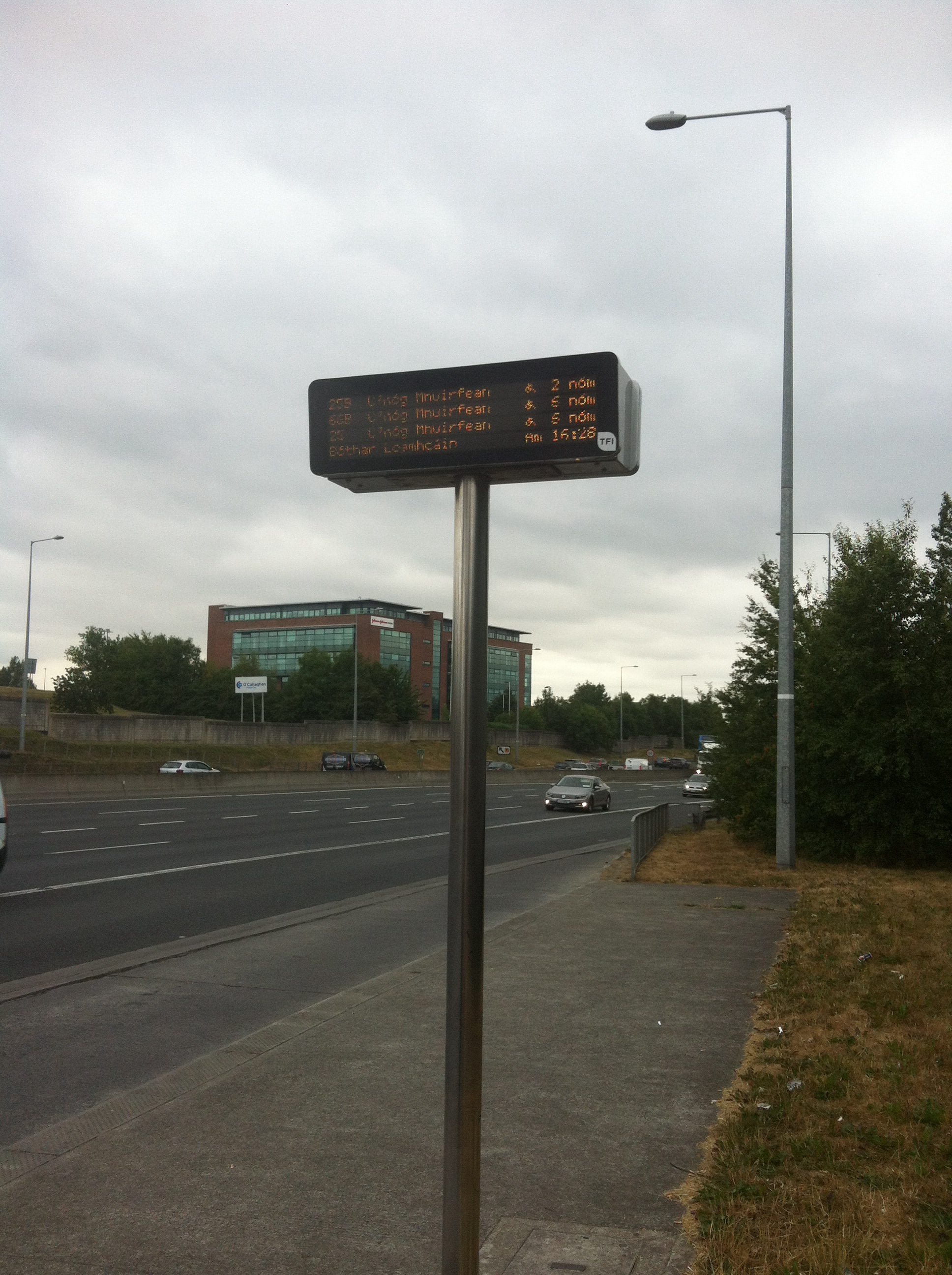
The RTPI system used by Dublin Bus, pictured at Liffey Valley.

During the 2010s, Dublin Bus rolled out an RTPI system (Real Time Passenger Information) at certain stops, which shows the amount of time before a bus arrives directly to the user.

In 2016, the company carried 125 million passengers, which was a reduction of 14% compared to 2005 numbers (first full year of the Luas, which has seen an increase of 33.6% passengers in the same period).

Between September 2018 and March 2019, 24 Dublin Bus routes and 125 buses were progressively taken over by Go-Ahead Ireland after the National Transport Authority put their operation out to tender, however an equivalent number of new buses were provided to Dublin Bus to retain existing fleet numbers, with increased services and new routes or route variations introduced on the same day as Go-Ahead took over each route batch.

In October 2023, route 99 began operating as a shuttle service between Parkgate Street and the Phoenix Park Visitor Centre. The 99 is the first Dublin Bus route to serve Chesterfield Avenue and important Phoenix Park sites such as Áras an Uachtaráin. This route was not included in the BusConnects network, and was not introduced as part of a BusConnects phase.

In September 2024, route 65a between Tallaght and Blessington was inaugurated as part of service improvements in the Blessington area. This route was also implemented separate to BusConnects.

=== Nitelink ===
On 6 December 1991 Dublin Bus launched its first 'Nitelink' service aimed at facilitating Christmas revellers returning home from the city centre. The trial service operated from 6 December 1991 to 4 January 1992 (except for certain holidays) on a Mon-Sun basis and cost a flat fare of £2 per person irrespective of how long or short their journey. Nitelink initially consisted of only four routes serving 12 suburban destinations in total with buses leaving on the hour every hour until 3am, from College Street, D'Olier Street and Westmoreland Street. Nitelink is an express service, meaning passengers may only board the buses at the city centre termini and other select locations along the way, although they may disembark at any normal bus stop along the route. Upon completing the journey the buses return to the city centre without passengers.

Over the years the Nitelink service increased to 18 routes overnight, and, until January 2009 ran between Monday and Saturday, with the greatest service frequency being on Friday and Saturday nights. Due to cutbacks necessitated by the 2008 economic downturn in Ireland, the midweek schedule was scrapped. By 2014 there were 18 Nitelink routes running again. Nitelink routes 15n and 41n were discontinued on the 1 December 2019 when 24-hour services on routes 15 and 41 came into effect. Some other areas previously served by the 15n and 41n Nitelinks (but not by the 15 or 41) became incorporated into other Nitelink services. A year later on 13 December 2020, Nitelink route 39n was similarly discontinued when daytime route 39a began operating on a 24-hour basis. Route 25n was discontinued on 16 October 2022 as part of Phase 4.

Due to the COVID-19 pandemic, Nitelink services were paused between March 2020 and January 2022 with a brief respite between Fri 22 Oct 2021 and 19 December 2021 during which time services resumed. The service was halted again on Sun 19 December 2021 when an 8pm curfew was put in place on the hospitality industry due to an increase in COVID-19 cases. Dublin City Councillor Colm O'Rourke criticised the move, noting "The Nitelink is not just for clubbers; it's for workers and anyone else who needs a low-cost service to get home safely – including people on low wages or perhaps students who work the weekend". Nitelink services eventually returned to full operating hours from Friday 28 January 2022.

Currently, as of October 2022 the Nitelink service operates on Friday and Saturday nights only (technically the early hours of Saturday and Sunday) and consists of 12 separate routes that depart between the hours of 00:00 and 04:00 from the Dublin city centre locations of D'Olier Street, Westmoreland Street and Aston Quay. Each of the route numbers is suffixed by the letter 'n' to denote their night status.

Special (higher) fares apply on Nitelink buses than regular daytime bus services. On 2 September 2022 TFI announced that Nitelink fares across all 13 routes were being reduced with immediate effect; Leap fares by 33% and cash fares by 43%. Sorin Costica, Head of Operations at Dublin Bus said the reduction in fares would "...help reduce night-time carbon emissions by encouraging people to take the bus as opposed to travelling by car."

=== 24-hour services ===
In 2014, Dublin Bus began looking to expand their Nitelink network and also introduce a new dedicated all-night service in the city. By late 2016, Dublin Bus 'Media and Communications Officer' Jennifer O'Brien stated that the company was looking at the possibility of introducing a 24-hour bus service in Dublin from 2017 in conjunction with the National Transport Authority on a phased basis. That same year, Dublin City Councillor Ciarán Cuffe (who also chaired the council's transport committee) said Dublin needed to look at extending the public-transport service at night noting that the last regular bus left the city at around 11:30pm each weeknight and the last Luas at around half past twelve, or midnight on Sundays.

In December 2019, the first of Dublin's 24-hour bus services were eventually rolled out. As of February 2026, the company operates fifteen such routes (which run 24-hours per day, 7 days per week), consisting of routes 15, 39a, 41, C1, C2, C3/5, C4/6, N4, G1, G2, E1, E2, F1, F2, and 80.

Speaking of the 24/7 buses, Dublin Bus have noted that "They are some of our busiest routes, showing the clear appetite for all day and all-night bus services in Dublin." It has been noted, however, that the service frequency on some of the 24-hour routes at night is insufficient, leading to buses to become filled to capacity. The failure of some scheduled buses showing up at night has also been flagged as an issue.

==== 15 and 41 ====
At midnight on 1 December 2019, routes 15 and 41 began operating on a 24-hours-a-day, seven-days-a-week basis with no difference in fare, marking the first time Dublin had a regular night bus service. These buses depart their terminals at intervals of 30 minutes between the hours of 11.30pm and 05:00am. Announcing the change, the NTA CEO Anne Graham explained "The patterns of work and socialising have changed. For instance, the success in attracting to the city, major employers who are headquartered many time-zones away, serving markets around the world, means that commercial and economic activity in Dublin continues around the clock".

In June 2022, chief executive of Dublin Bus Ray Coyne told 'Breakfast Business' on Newstalk radio that of the six 24-hour services the company was currently running, route number 15 was "probably the most successful one". He added "We're looking to see if we can increase the frequency on those (six 24-hour services)... the demand is extremely high". Commenting on the 24-hour services in Sep 2022, Gary Kelly, Chief Inspector with Dublin Bus explained how they were a "huge success" witnessing "a big demand". He explained "The 41 from Abbey Street to Swords will often be full at 4am in the morning with workers on their way to Dublin Airport and revellers heading home to Swords [..] That one was badly needed over the years. Two years ago, all those workers would have (had) to drive to the airport and pay for parking, or take a taxi. I can't even imagine".

==== 39a ====
Route 39a began 24-hour operation on 13 December 2020.

==== C Spine (C1, C2, C5, C6) ====
On 28 November 2021 the National Transport Authority implemented Phase 2 of the rollout of its latest Dublin network with the C Spine, that consists of new C1-C4 routes serving the west of the city. The C1 and C2 services operate 24-hours a day, while the C3 and C4 buses turn into the C5 and C6, that operate through Chapelizod village instead of via the Chapelizod bypass at night. The night-time routes operate every hour, starting between 11:36pm and 00:35am every night of the week, and ending at 4am when normal services commence. Upon the introduction of the C Spine, Minister for Transport Eamon Ryan said that it "provides the communities on its route not just increased frequency, but also a night service offering commuters 24-hour bus connections."

==== N4 ====
As part of BusConnects Phase 3, the N4 (Blanchardstown Shopping Centre – Point Village via Collins Avenue), came into operation on 29 May 2022. The route was originally supposed to begin in January 2022 but was delayed due to driver shortages. Driver shortages would also delay the rollout of the G-Spine routes later in the year. Anne Graham, CEO of the NTA, stated that "Today's launch is one further step in the delivery of an effective and efficient bus service for the Dublin city region. The network is beginning to take shape and we are confident that this Phase will be just as successful as the previous ones."

==== G Spine (G1, G2) ====
Phase 4 consisting of the G-Spine of routes G1 and G2 (both 24-hour), and daytime route 60, was launched on 16 October 2022. The phase was originally planned to launch on 28 August 2022 but needed to be pushed back until October 2022 due to driver shortages. Route G1 runs from the Red Cow Luas stop to Spencer Dock via Ballyfermot and the city centre, and G2 operates much the same route but instead connects Liffey Valley Shopping Centre with Spencer Dock, via Ballyfermot and the city centre. Overnight, the G1 and G2 run every hour between 12pm and 5am. One week after the routes launched, Senator Mary Seery Kearney noted she had already received numerous complaints concerning the new routes, with instances of buses not turning up and buses being full. Seery Kearney explained she had contacted the Oireachtas Transport Committee to urgently seek a meeting to review the situation.

==== E Spine ====
Phase 6a, consisting of the new 24-hour routes E1 and E2, as well as eleven other daytime routes, began on 26 January 2025.

==== F Spine ====
Phase 7, consisting of the new 24-hour routes F1, F2, and 80, began on 19 October 2025. The route of the 80, as well as another two daytime routes brought in as part of the phase, were altered in February 2026 following complaints.

==== Proposed developments ====
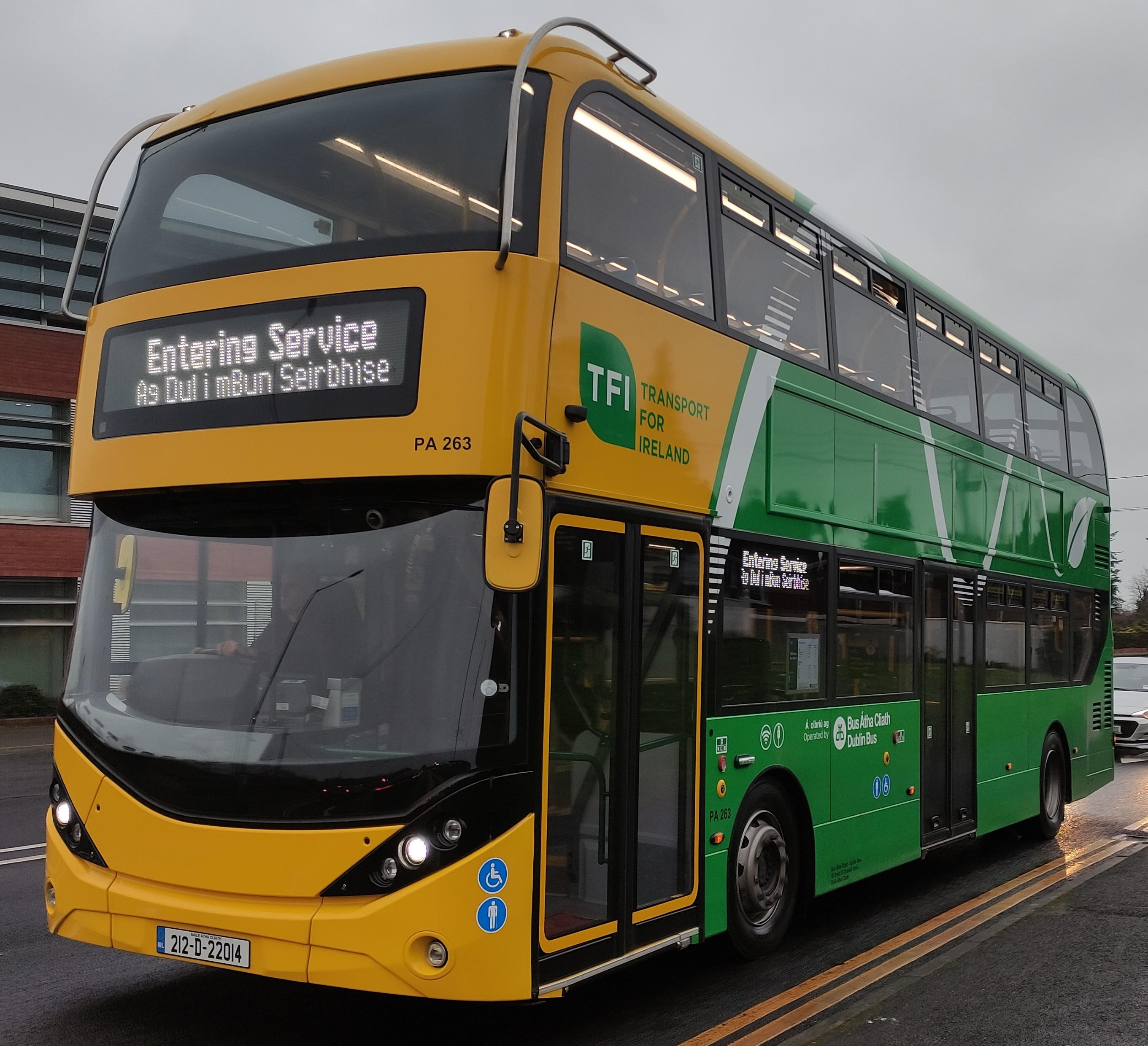
Alexander Dennis Enviro400ER hybrid in the new TFI colours

In May 2022, Dublin Bus announced it was considering the expansion of a 24-hour service to include a route that serves Bray. In his submission to the Joint Committee on Transport and Communications, Ray Coyne (Chief Executive of Dublin Bus) said "24/7 bus services are needed to deliver a truly all-day and all-night city [and] the broader economic needs of the city justify accelerating the introduction of 24/7 services on routes such as 46a, 155 and others".

In June 2022, Ray Coyne mentioned that Dublin Bus wanted to increase the frequency of buses operating on their six 24-hour routes. He particularly mentioned the success of the route 15, but added that "demand is extremely high" across all the night routes.

Speaking to TheJournal.ie in August 2022, a spokesperson for the Department of Transport noted that 24-hour services on the planned E-Spine, F-Spine and O-orbital routes set to start in 2023 are under consideration. The E and F routes are proposed to serve the Charlestown Shopping Centre and Northwood areas, the city centre, Bray and Dún Laoghaire. The O-orbital route are due to serve the North and South Circular Road areas. In addition, they noted that "the NTA has indicated that there is potential for each of the spine groups to have at least one route running 24 hours, but final decisions will be made closer to the time of each rollout".

Dublin Bus's official website includes an un-dated article named "Working Together To Build a Truly 24-Hour Dublin" which outlines their intention to introduce additional 24-hour routes to Dublin in advance of BusConnects' full implementation. Conscious of the fact that County Dublin's population is set to reach two million by 2030, the company acknowledged that Dublin is at the cusp of a transformational era as it develops into a truly 24-hour city. The company noted the challenges facing commuters in post-COVID Dublin, but also the opportunities: "Thousands of taxis have left the market. At the same time many new businesses are opening in our capital. Our hospitality sector is recovering strongly from the pandemic, and we are seeing the welcome return of large-scale events like concerts. So, we are confident that the customer demand is there for further 24-hour services".

In late September 2022, Transport for Ireland launched a campaign named "Around the city, around the clock" aimed at highlighting night-time bus services in Dublin in the run up to Christmas. Acting CEO of Dublin Bus, Andrea Keane, emphasised the economic importance of the service in 2022 noting that "The night-time economy in Dublin is growing post-pandemic and the TFI Network is expanding to reflect that. Night-time commuters can now hop on Dublin Bus services to get home affordably".

== BusConnects ==
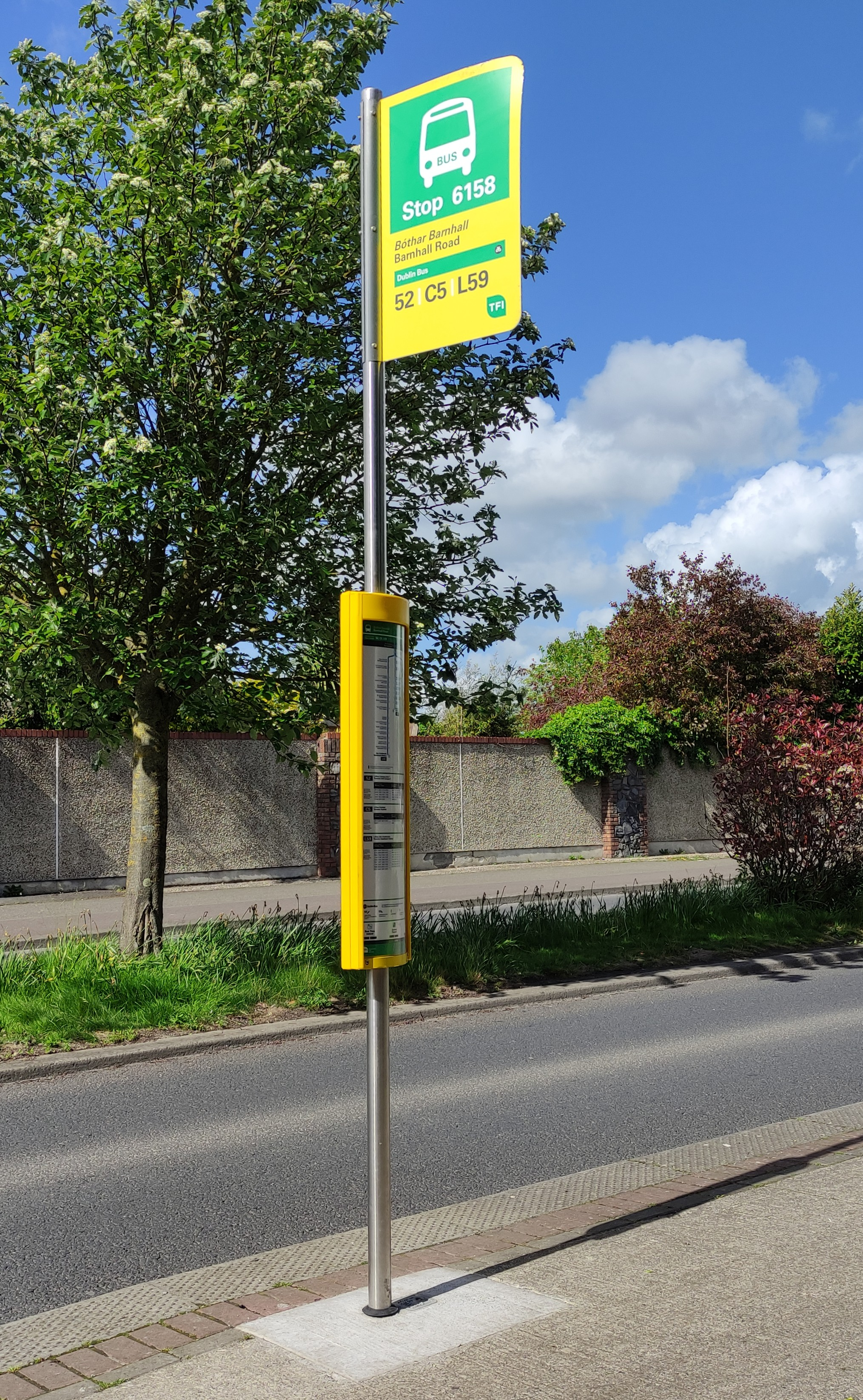
Typical Dublin Bus stop in Leixlip.

As part of the National Transport Authority's BusConnects network redesign project, in 2017 and 2018, a US-based consulting firm (Jarrett Walker + Associates) were employed to review and redesign the daytime bus network in and around Dublin. The purpose of the network redesign was to improve network functionality and increase bus ridership in the Dublin Metropolitan Area, an area which encompasses over 1.4 million people over several counties. It was noted that the traditional Dublin Bus network was good for many radial routes (i.e. taking people from the suburbs into the city core) but lacked orbital accessibility (i.e. getting from suburb to suburb). The initial network proposal was released for public consultation in summer 2018, and the revised proposal was released for public comment by October 2019. The NTA began implementing the new network in stages, starting in 2021. The company drew similarities between their proposed Dublin transport plan to that in place in Copenhagen, a city of comparable size and shape. As part of their contract, Jarrett Walker + Associates were not tasked with the expansion of 24-hour and night-time bus services in Dublin, as this was a separate decision taken by the NTA without their involvement.

On 27 June 2021, Phase 1 of the Bus Connects program was rolled out with routes 29a, 31/a/b and 32 being replaced by the "H Spine" routes H1, H2 and H3. Route 6 was also introduced to replace routes 31a and 31b in Howth. Increased frequency, particularly at weekends and earlier and later services, was also added with these changes.

Phase 2 of the BusConnects Network Redesign launched on 28 November 2021 in West Dublin and East Kildare. It involved the introduction of the C-Spine (C1, C2, C3, C4), route 52, eight peak-only routes (P29, X25, X26, X27, X28, X30, X31 and X32), six local routes (L51, L52, L53, L54, L58 and L59) and the two night-time routes of the C5 and C6. The Phase 2 routes are operated by Dublin Bus, with the exception of the L51 and L52 which are operated by Go-Ahead Ireland. A number of old Dublin Bus routes were discontinued with the introduction of the redesign, including the 25 and 66.

Phase 3, consisting of the N4 and N6 north Dublin orbitals, came into effect on 29 May 2022. The N4 travels from Point Village to Blanchardstown Shopping Centre serving Killester, Whitehall, DCU, Finglas and Connolly Hospital. The N6 travels from Kilbarrack to Finglas Village, serving Coolock, Beaumont and Ballymun. There is a 10-minute frequency on both the N4 and N6 at most times on weekdays and Saturdays, with the addition of a 24-hour service on the Route N4, running every 30 minutes every night of the week.

Phase 4, consisting of the G-Spine of routes G1 and G2 (both 24-hour), and route 60, launched on 16 October 2022, replacing routes 79/a and the western branch of route 40, which was curtailed to Earlsfort Terrace.

Phase 5b of the programme was launched on 26 November 2023, consisting of new orbital routes, local routes, and radials, with the cessation of route 61 and the introduction of routes 74, L25, and S2.

Phase 6a introduced Route N2 on 29 September, operated by Go-Ahead Ireland. The rest of the phase was delayed from early December 2024 and commenced on 26 January 2025 with the introduction of the E Spine consisting of two 24-hour routes, the E1 and E2, as well as the radial route 19, and local routes L12 and L14.

Along with these changes, routes: 46a/e, 84/a, 145, 155 and the express 84x route, ceased operations on the 25th of January 2025, and also, the northbound termini of routes 11, 4 and 13 were all changed in this phase alongside the new routes. Route 11 to Phoenix Park, route 4 to Heuston Station, and route 13 to Mountjoy Square

Phase 7 commenced on 19 October 2025 with the launch of the F Spine, routes F1, F2, and F3 (24-hour except for F3). Five radials were also introduced: routes 23, 24, 80 (24-hour), 82, operated by Dublin Bus, as well as 73, operated by Go-Ahead Ireland.

Along with this, routes 9, 26, 40/b, 49, 54a, 83/a, 123, and 140 ceased operations, while routes 122 and 150 had part of their routes altered.

=== Spines ===
| Route | Origin | Destination | Notes | Start Date |
|---|---|---|---|---|
| C1 | Sandymount | Adamstown Station | 24-hour service. | 28 November 2021 |
| C2 | Sandymount | Adamstown Station | 24-hour service. | 28 November 2021 |
| C3 | Ringsend | Maynooth | | 28 November 2021 |
| C4 | Ringsend | Maynooth Station | | 28 November 2021 |
| C5 | Ringsend | Maynooth | Night service only. | 28 November 2021 |
| C6 | Ringsend | Maynooth Station | Night service only. | 28 November 2021 |
| E1 (Note: Ireland's, as well as county Dublin's and Wicklow's most frequent bus route (100 southbound departures and 94 northbound departures a day).) | Northwood | Ballywaltrim | 24-hour service. | 26 January 2025 |
| E2 | Harristown | Dún Laoghaire | 24-hour service. | 26 January 2025 |
| F1 | IKEA | The Square | 24-hour service. | 19 October 2025 |
| F2 | Charlestown SC | Rossmore | 24-hour service. | 19 October 2025 |
| F3 | Charlestown SC | Limekiln Avenue | | 19 October 2025 |
| G1 | Spencer Dock Luas stop | Red Cow Luas stop | 24-hour service. | 16 October 2022 |
| G2 | Spencer Dock Luas stop | Liffey Valley SC | 24-hour service. | 16 October 2022 |
| H1 | Abbey Street | Baldoyle | | 27 June 2021 |
| H2 | Abbey Street | Malahide | | 27 June 2021 |
| H3 | Abbey Street | Howth | | 27 June 2021 |

=== Radial Routes ===
| Route | Origin | Destination | Notes | Start Date |
|---|---|---|---|---|
| 6 | Abbey Street | Howth Station | | 27 June 2021 |
| 19 | Dublin Airport | Merrion Square | | 26 January 2025 |
| 23 | Charlestown SC | Merrion Square | | 19 October 2025 |
| 24 | Dublin Airport | Merrion Square | | 19 October 2025 |
| 52 | Ringsend | Leixlip | | 28 November 2021 |
| 60 | Sir John Rogerson's Quay | Red Cow Luas stop | | 16 October 2022 |
| 74 | Dundrum Luas | Eden Quay | | 26 November 2023 |
| 80 | Liffey Valley SC | Palmerston Park | 24 hour service. | 19 October 2025 |
| 82 | Irishtown | Kiltipper | | 19 October 2025 |

=== Orbitals ===
| Route | Origin | Destination | Notes | Start Date |
|---|---|---|---|---|
| N4 | Point Village | Blanchardstown Centre | 24 hour service. | 29 May 2022 |
| S2 | Heuston Station | Poolbeg | | 26 November 2023 |

=== Local Routes ===
| Route | Origin | Destination | Notes | Start Date |
|---|---|---|---|---|
| L12 | Ballywaltrim | Bray Station | | 26 January 2025 |
| L14 | Ballywaltrim | Palermo | | 26 January 2025 |
| L25 | Dundrum Luas | Dún Laoghaire Mallin Station | | 26 November 2023 |
| L53 | Liffey Valley | Adamstown Station | | 28 November 2021 |
| L54 | Red Cow Luas stop | Leixlip | | 28 November 2021 |
| L58 | Leixlip | Hazelhatch and Celbridge Station | | 28 November 2021 |
| L59 | Leixlip | Hazelhatch and Celbridge Station | | 28 November 2021 |
| L89 | Broombridge Luas | Toberburr | | 19 October 2025 |

=== Peak Time and Express Routes ===
| Route | Origin | Destination | Notes | Start Date |
|---|---|---|---|---|
| P29 | Adamstown Station | Ringsend Road | Peak service (towards City) only. | 28 November 2021 |
| X1 | Kilcoole | City Centre | Peak service only. | 26 January 2025 |
| X2 | Newcastle | City Centre | Peak service only. | 26 January 2025 |
| X25 | University College Dublin | Maynooth | Peak service only. | 28 November 2021 |
| X26 | Maynooth | Leeson Street | Peak service (towards City) only. To UCD from 03 Mar 2025. | 28 November 2021 |
| X27 | University College Dublin | Celbridge | Peak service only. | 28 November 2021 |
| X28 | University College Dublin | Celbridge | Peak service only. | 28 November 2021 |
| X30 | University College Dublin | Adamstown Station | Peak service only. | 28 November 2021 |
| X31 | Earlsfort Terrace | Leixlip | Peak service only. To/from UCD from 03 Mar 2025. | 28 November 2021 |
| X32 | Earlsfort Terrace | Leixlip | Peak service only. To/from UCD from 03 Mar 2025. | 28 November 2021 |

=== Withdrawn routes ===
| Route | Origin | Destination | Notes | Start Date | End Date |
|---|---|---|---|---|---|
| H9 | Raheny | Abbey Street | Peak service (towards City) only. | 27 June 2021 | 27 May 2022 |

== Impact of COVID-19 ==
The COVID-19 pandemic led to the suspension of Airlink, Nitelink and some Xpresso services in March 2020; Airlink services were later permanently suspended five months later. With the easing of restrictions in January 2022, Dublin Bus announced all Nitelink services would return to normal from Friday, 28 January 2022. The use of facemasks onboard became optional from Monday 28 February 2022.

== Route map ==
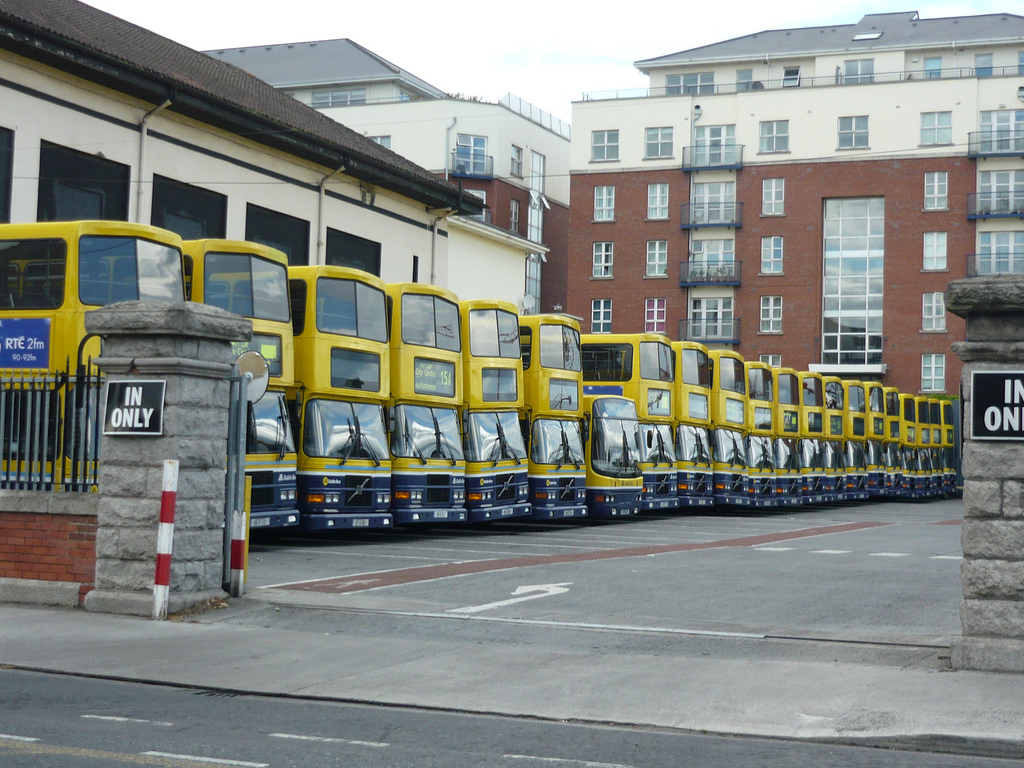
Line up at Ringsend depot in May 2010

Uniquely for a capital city's primary transit network, no full system-wide street and route map was available online for many years. Dublin Bus cites high licensing fees from fellow state-owned company, Ordnance Survey Ireland (OSI). OSI historically published a printed street map, reissued every two to five years, which included bus routes. However, the edition published June 2011 omitted these for the first time.

Dublin Bus's Core Route Map does, however, provide some visual information about key routes in the city.

Dublin Bus previously employed an international design company, 'Applied', and a Dublin consultancy to assist in making its route maps more legible. The aim was to develop clearer route information, with the aim of improving access and encouraging the visitor economy.

With the advent of BusConnects, an official citywide route map was published for the first time on the BusConnects.ie website.

== Fares and payment ==
In 2021, Dublin Bus fares migrated to a simplified system, with a short journey fare for journeys of up to three "fare stages" (roughly 2–3 km) and a normal fare for longer trips. Paying the normal fare using a TFI Leap Card allows free transfers to other Dublin Bus, Luas, and certain Iarnród Éireann services for a 90-minute period. Transfers are not available on paper tickets. Higher fares apply to limited-stop peak time Xpresso services (route numbers prefixed/suffixed with X) and to late-night Nitelink services (route numbers suffixed with N).

In general, Dublin Bus encourages prepaid or reloadable ticket use, and for cash payment, it operates an 'exact fare' policy. Passengers must place the exact fare in coins (notes are not accepted) in a "fare box" at the driver's cabin, and the ticket is issued. In case of overpayment, no change is given, and a system of issuing 'refund due' receipts, which operated for many years, ended in September 2018.

The wide variety of pre-paid tickets historically issued for Dublin Bus services has been withdrawn over time. Fare capping applies to frequent use of the same Leap card within a day or calendar week (Monday to Sunday), and a "rambler" pack of five or 30 non-consecutive one-day unlimited travel can be purchased and loaded to a Leap card for a slight discount. Monthly and annual season tickets are also offered.

Prepaid tickets must be validated in a machine by the door of the bus at the start of each journey, although the validation process for leap cards differs depending on the distance being travelled and the ticket being used.

Old age pensioners and children aged five and under (as of 1 December 2017) are allowed to travel free of charge; this is part of the national "Free Travel Pass" system operated by the Department of Social Protection.

Passengers who choose not to pay a fare or who travel beyond the limit paid for may be issued a fine, called a "standard fare", of €100.

Spanish company Indra Sistemas S.A. is in the process of developing a payment system onboard buses that will allow customers to use credit or debit cards to pay, as well as mobile devices. It is expected to come online in 2028.

== Fleet ==
As of October 2026, the fleet consisted of around 1,165 buses.

| Quantity | Manufacturer | Type | Fleet Code | Passengers | Length | Entered service | Doors | Decks |
|---|---|---|---|---|---|---|---|---|
| 12 | Volvo | B9TLT (Euro 4) with Enviro500 bodywork | VT | 119–124 | 12 m | 2005–2007 | 1 | 2 |
| 28 | Volvo | B7TL (Mk. II) with ALX400 bodywork | AX | 91 | 9.9 m | 2006 | 1 | 2 |
| 78 | Volvo | B9TL (Euro 4) with Enviro400 bodywork | EV | 94 | 10.2 m | 2007–2009 | 1 | 2 |
| 24 | Volvo | B9TL (Euro 4) with Eclipse Gemini bodywork | VG | 88 | 10.4 m | 2008–2009 | 1 | 2 |
| 142 | Volvo | B9TL (Euro 5) with Eclipse Gemini bodywork | GT | 78–81 | 10.4 m | 2012–2013 | 2 | 2 |
| 483 | Volvo | B5TL (Euro 6) with Gemini 3 bodywork | SG | 95 | 10.5 m | 2014–2021 | 2 | 2 |
| 2 | Wrightbus | StreetLite DF integral | WS | 37 | 10.2 m | 2017 | 1 | 1 |
| 3 | Wrightbus | StreetDeck integral hybrid diesel-electric | WH | | | 2019 | 2 | 2 |
| 3 | Volvo | Volvo B5LH hybrid diesel-electric with Wright Gemini 3 bodywork | VH | | | 2019 | 2 | 2 |
| 3 | Alexander Dennis | Enviro400H MMC integral hybrid diesel-electric | AH | | | 2020 | 2 | 2 |
| 217 | Alexander Dennis | Alexander Dennis Enviro400ER hybrid diesel-electric integral stop start | PA | 60 (Seated) | 10.3m or 11m | 2021 | 2 | 2 |
| 164 | Wrightbus | Wright StreetDeck Electroliner | EW | 73–104 | 10.57m or 11.5m | 2023- | 2 | 2 |
| 5 | Alexander Dennis | Enviro200EV | EA | 73 | 12m | 2024- | 2 | 1 |

Bus types of significance, such as the GAC Ireland, have been preserved by the National Transport Museum of Ireland, which houses R1 (the first Dublin United Tramways Leyland double-decker service bus in Dublin). Many ex-CIÉ and Dublin Bus types have been acquired by private preservationists, some of whom are associated with the Transport Enthusiasts Club (TEC). The vehicles are garaged, restored and run by the owners without state funds and take part in films, television programs and in vintage rallies.

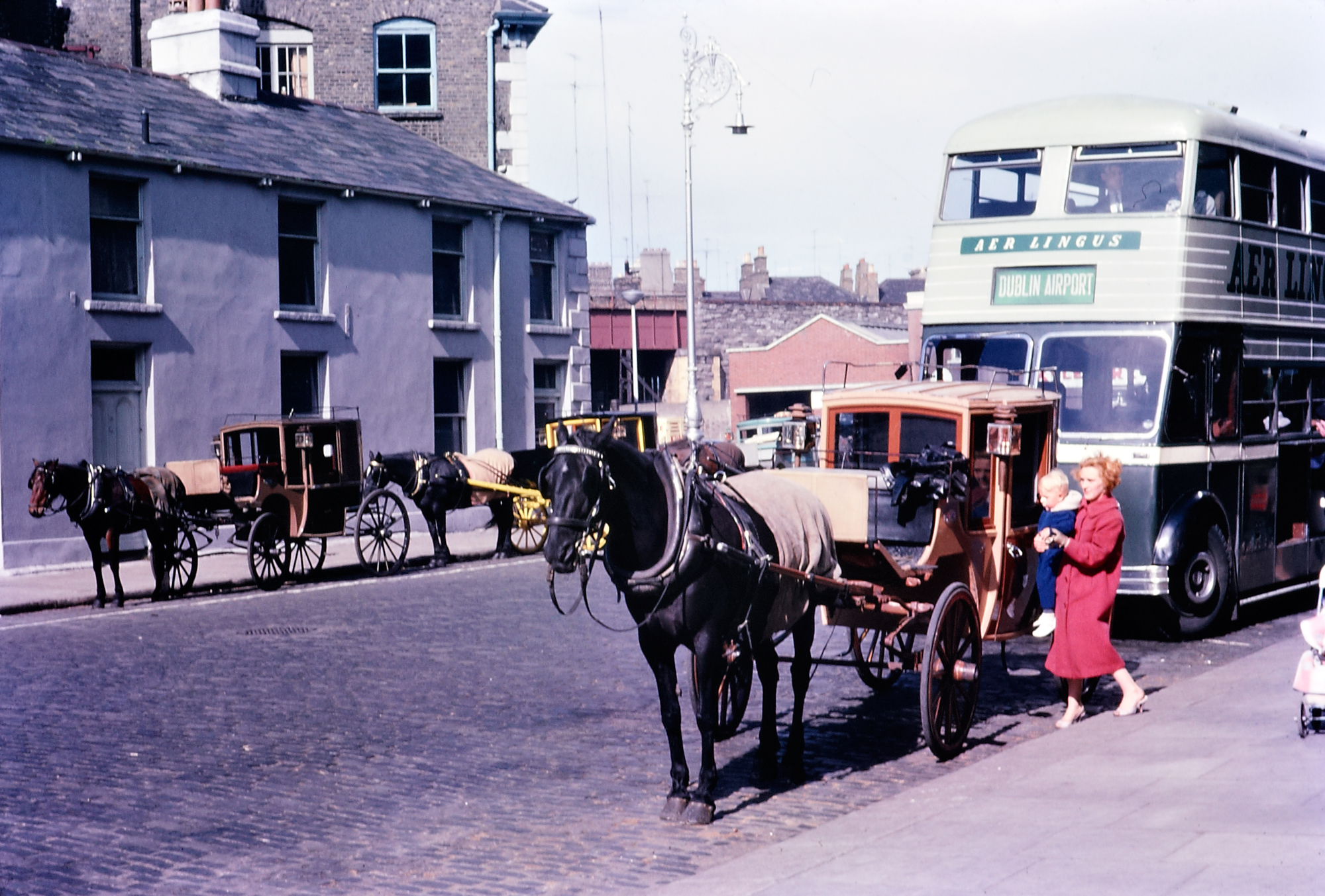
In September 1961 with the airport bus and horse-powered hackney carriage competition.

== Incidents ==
=== Christchurch ===
In 1989, a youth grabbed the steering wheel of a Tallaght-bound double-decker as it turned the corner opposite Christchurch, and the bus crashed onto its side. Multiple passengers were injured but none were seriously injured.

=== Wellington Quay ===
On 21 February 2004, at Wellington Quay, Dublin, a bus mounted on pavement and crashed into a queue of 30 people, killing five and injuring 14. The driver was tried for dangerous driving causing death. His trial began in February 2007 at Dublin Circuit Court, but he was acquitted.

=== North Strand Road ===
Bus Destroyed accident on 5 February 2009 at North Strand Road with Alexander ALX400

On 5 February 2009, a bus on route from Abbey Street to Artane collided with a tree on North Strand Road, and the entire roof section was torn off. The driver was treated in hospital for shock but there were no other injuries as no passengers were seated in the upper deck.

=== Dublin City Centre ===
On 16 September 2009, a collision between a Red Line Luas tram and a number 16 Dublin Bus (AV266) from Ballinteer to Dublin Airport in Dublin City Centre at the intersection of Abbey Street and O'Connell Street injured 21 people. Three people, including the Luas driver, were cut out of the wreckage. The Luas was derailed in the accident. Two female passengers remained trapped on the bus for up to 45 minutes after the crash.

=== Smithfield ===
On 16 March 2019, an out-of-service double-decker bus (VG2) collided with a tram at the junction at Queen Street near the Smithfield Luas stop. Several people were hospitalised with non-life-threatening injuries.

=== Ballsbridge ===
On 2 October 2020, a double-decker (GT8) operating on route 7A was involved in a serious collision with a stolen car at the junction of Northumberland Road and Haddington Road in Ballsbridge, resulting in the bus hitting a tree. Eight people were hospitalised, with two bus passengers requiring intensive care.

=== 2023 Dublin riot ===
On 23 November 2023, four Dublin Bus buses were hijacked and set on fire amid anti-immigrant unrest in Dublin city centre following a stabbing outside a primary school earlier in the day.

== See also ==
- Go-Ahead Ireland
- Bus Éireann
- Luas
- Transport in Dublin
- Transport for Ireland
- Dublin Area Rapid Transit, local rail services in Dublin
