= TFI Leap Card =

Irish public transport payment card

- Location: Nationwide
- Launched: 12 December 2011
- Technology: MIFARE DESFire EV1
- Manager: National Transport Authority
- Currency: Euro (€150 maximum load)
- Stored-value: Pay as you go and period tickets
- Auto recharge: Yes
- Unlimited use: Selected period tickets
- Validity: Dublin Bus/Go-Ahead Ireland; DART; Luas; Iarnród Éireann; Bus Éireann; TFI Local Link; Swords Express; Ashbourne Connect; Collins Coaches; Matthews.ie; City Direct; Wexford Bus
- Retailed: Online; TFI Leap agents and post offices; Selected railway ticket machines
- Variants: Adult / Adult Personalised; Child 5–8 / 5–15 / 16–18; Young Adult 19–25; Student; Visitor
- Website: https://leapcard.ie

Example of a TFI Leap Card

The TFI Leap Card is a contactless smart card for automated fare collection overseen by the National Transport Authority (NTA) under the Transport for Ireland (TFI) brand. It was introduced in the Greater Dublin area in 2011 for Luas, DART, Iarnród Éireann commuter rail and Dublin Bus, but acceptance has significantly expanded, and it is now accepted on TFI bus services, Luas, DART and commuter rail in the Dublin fare zones, Cork commuter rail, and a number of commercial bus services.

Initially, Leap Cards offered only a pre-paid electronic wallet system for single-trip fares, but monthly, annual and other period tickets have subsequently been made available on the platform. Adult Leap fares can be up to 30% cheaper than corresponding cash fares, while Young Adult and Student Leap Cards provide discounts of up to 50%. In the Dublin area, integrated ticketing is provided principally through the TFI 90 Minute Fare and fare capping, while a four-zone system applies to longer commuter journeys. The minimum Travel Credit top-up is €5, and cards can be topped up through the TFI Leap Top-Up app, at authorised sales agents, at Luas and Iarnród Éireann ticket machines, and through other supported channels.

== History ==
The Railway Procurement Agency, now part of Transport Infrastructure Ireland, was responsible for the development of light railway and metro infrastructure and developing an integrated smart card system. First plans were made at the end of the last century and initially it was planned to introduce an integrated card when the Luas system would start to operate in 2004 or 2005. The development of the new system had many delays and setbacks, including the withdrawal of all three bidders in a 2005 tender; and the costs for the new system were far higher than originally budgeted. This led to the development of the Leap Card platform from scratch, with the first cards becoming available to the general public in December 2011.

Prior to this, both Luas and Iarnród Éireann in the Greater Dublin Area had rolled out their own, non-interoperable smartcard systems. Dublin Bus also introduced prepaid smartcard tickets before Leap; smartcard tickets were introduced in July 2008, and by the end of that year 55% of its prepaid tickets had migrated from magnetic-stripe tickets to smartcards. These operator-specific products did not, however, provide a single interoperable pay-as-you-go system across the principal public transport operators.

Initially, Leap primarily offered discounted single fares. Period tickets were subsequently incorporated, with monthly and annual TaxSaver products progressively moved to the Leap platform during 2013 and 2014. Monthly and annual TaxSaver tickets continue to be available on Adult Personalised Leap Cards for TFI services and a number of commercial operators.

Greater Dublin Area fare capping was introduced for single operators in 2012, with a multi-operator cap introduced in 2013. A further step towards an all-mode fare was introduced in 2015 with the Leap90 discount, which gave a €1 discount on a second journey made within 90 minutes of a previous journey.

The fully integrated TFI 90 Minute Fare was introduced in Dublin on 28 November 2021, allowing passengers to transfer between eligible Dublin Bus, Go-Ahead Ireland, Luas, DART and commuter rail services within the fare period. The adult fare was originally €2.30 and was subsequently reduced to €2 as part of the public transport fare reductions introduced in 2022. As of September 2026, the Dublin TFI 90 Minute Fare is €2 for adults, €1 for Young Adult and Student Leap Card holders and €0.65 for children.

In 2025, a four-zone Leap fare structure was implemented across Dublin and its surrounding commuter area, extending to approximately 50 kilometres (31 mi) from the city centre. Rail zonal fares were introduced first, followed by revised Dublin commuter bus fares on 16 June 2025.

On 3 September 2025, the NTA introduced a Child 5–8 Leap Card, giving children aged five to eight free travel on TFI bus, train and tram services until their ninth birthday. Children under five already travel free without requiring a Leap Card.

The Leap-compatible smartcard infrastructure is also used for the Free Travel Scheme through the Free Travel Public Services Card. From 1 March 2026, paper Free Travel Passes ceased to be valid and passengers using the scheme are required to have a valid, in-date Free Travel Public Services Card.

== Use ==
Generic Adult and Child 5–15 Leap Cards can be purchased online or from authorised TFI Leap sales agents, while personalised cards are ordered online. The Adult Leap Card requires a €5 refundable deposit and a minimum €5 initial top-up, giving an initial cost of €10. Child 5–15 and Child 16–18 cards require a €3 deposit and minimum €5 top-up, giving an initial cost of €8. Young Adult and Student cards require a €5 deposit and minimum €5 top-up, for an initial cost of €10. The Child 5–8 card is instead used to provide free travel on the TFI network.

Cards can be obtained from the Leap Card website, authorised sales agents and suitably equipped Iarnród Éireann ticket machines. Generic Adult and Child cards are available from approximately 2,500 TFI Leap agents nationwide, while personalised cards are available online.

Travel Credit can be topped up at authorised sales agents, Luas and Iarnród Éireann ticket machines, through the website, through Auto Top-Up and using the TFI Leap Top-Up app on a compatible NFC-enabled iPhone or Android smartphone. The minimum Travel Credit top-up is €5 and the stated maximum amount that a Leap Card can store is €150. Registered and personalised cards can also use Auto Top-Up, which automatically adds a pre-selected amount when the Travel Credit balance falls below a specified threshold.

A card normally needs a positive Travel Credit balance when tapping on. Where there is some positive balance but insufficient Travel Credit to cover a journey, the additional amount may be taken from the refundable card deposit; the card must then be topped up before Travel Credit can be used again. Separate minimum-balance requirements apply to rail travel: as of September 2026, an Adult Leap Card requires at least €1 to begin a rail journey within Dublin Zone 1 and €2.50 for journeys to or from Zones 2–4.

It is also possible to reload a registered card using the Leap Card website. An online purchase must subsequently be collected onto the card at a nominated collection point or using the Leap Top-Up app before it can be used. When a Leap Card is registered, the cardholder can view the card balance and recent transaction history online and can obtain protection for the card's balance if it is lost or stolen.

=== Fares ===
There is no single nationwide Leap fare, as prices vary by operator, mode and distance. The following are representative Travel Credit fares in operation As of September 2026.

Selected current Leap fares
Fare	Adult	Young Adult / Student	Child
Dublin short fare	€1.50	€0.75	€0.65
Dublin TFI 90 Minute Fare	€2.00	€1.00	€0.65
Dublin Zone 1 daily cap	€6.00	€3.00	€1.95
Dublin Zone 1 weekly cap	€24.00	€12.00	€7.80
Cork TFI 90 Minute Fare	€1.70	€0.85	€0.55

For longer Dublin commuter journeys using Travel Credit, adult rail fares to the city centre are €3.90 from Zone 2, €6.00 from Zone 3 and €7.50 from Zone 4. Equivalent adult commuter-bus fares are €3.70, €5.30 and €6.30 respectively. Thus, within the Dublin zonal system, common adult Leap single fares range from €1.50 for a short Zone 1 journey to €7.50 for a Zone 4 rail journey to the city centre, although fares elsewhere in Ireland and on commercial operators vary.

Multimodal zonal tickets are also available. As of September 2026, adult daily multimodal tickets cost €10 for Zones 1–2, €14 for Zones 1–3 and €16.80 for Zones 1–4; the corresponding weekly tickets cost €32, €56 and €67.20, while monthly tickets cost €140, €196 and €235.20 respectively.

On 3 September 2026, the NTA announced that fares on Public Service Obligation services would be revised from January 2027. Adult fares are due to increase by an average of 15%, while the 50% Young Adult and Student discount and free travel for children under nine are to be retained. These announced increases are therefore not reflected in the September 2026 fares above.

== Transport operators ==
Acceptance has extended well beyond the original operators. The Leap Card is currently accepted on core TFI services and a range of commercial bus services, although the products and fare types available can differ between operators.

- Aircoach
- Ashbourne Connect
- Bus Éireann
- City Direct
- Collins Coaches
- Dublin Bus
- Dublin Coach
- Dualway Coaches
- Go-Ahead Ireland
- Iarnród Éireann – DART and commuter rail in Dublin Zones 1–4 and Cork commuter services
- J.J. Kavanagh & Sons
- Matthews Coaches
- Nolan Coaches – FerryLink Route 853
- Swords Express
- TFI Local Link
- Wexford Bus

== Capabilities ==
The capabilities of the card have been extended to cover a range of passenger groups and ticket products. The following are currently in operation:

- Monthly and annual passes. Monthly and annual TaxSaver tickets can be loaded onto Adult Personalised Leap Cards for TFI operators and a number of participating commercial services.

- Child fares. Children under five travel free without a card. Children aged five to eight can obtain a Child 5–8 Leap Card providing free travel on TFI services until their ninth birthday. Children aged five to fifteen can use a standard Child 5–15 Leap Card for discounted fares, while passengers aged sixteen to eighteen can obtain a personalised Child 16–18 Leap Card, which expires on the holder's nineteenth birthday.

- Young Adult fares. The Young Adult Leap Card is available to people aged 19 to 25 inclusive and expires on the holder's 26th birthday. It provides fares of up to 50% below corresponding adult fares on participating services.

- Student fares. Student Leap Cards are available to eligible full-time students aged 16–18 or aged 26 and over. The qualifying course must normally involve at least 15 hours of study per week and last at least six months or 25 weeks. In August 2018, University College Dublin Students' Union suspended the sale of student Leap cards due to data privacy concerns.

== Technical characteristics ==
The Leap Card uses a chip that can be read from and written to without direct contact, making it a proximity card using RFID technology. The system uses MIFARE DESFire EV1 technology. A 2018 case study published by NXP Semiconductors states that the NTA selected MIFARE DESFire EV1 instead of the legacy MIFARE Classic platform because it provided stronger security and greater flexibility, and also enabled secure NFC-based mobile top-ups.

The original integrated ticketing system was reported as having cost approximately €55 million by the time Leap Card was launched in December 2011. The NTA subsequently contracted DXC Technology to provide elements of the integrated ticketing back-office operation, including IT management, retail-network and web-portal services.

In 2024, the NTA awarded Indra a contract for a Next Generation Ticketing (NGT) system intended to replace the existing Leap Card infrastructure with a cloud-hosted, account-based ticketing system capable of accepting bank cards, mobile phones and other smart devices. The NTA stated in January 2026 that the Leap system had processed more than €2.8 billion in payments since its launch. New ticket validators are expected to begin appearing from 2027, with contactless bank-card and mobile-device payments planned to become available from 2028. Leap Cards, Free Travel cards and discounted-fare products are intended to remain supported during the transition.
