= Luas =

Tram system in Dublin, Ireland

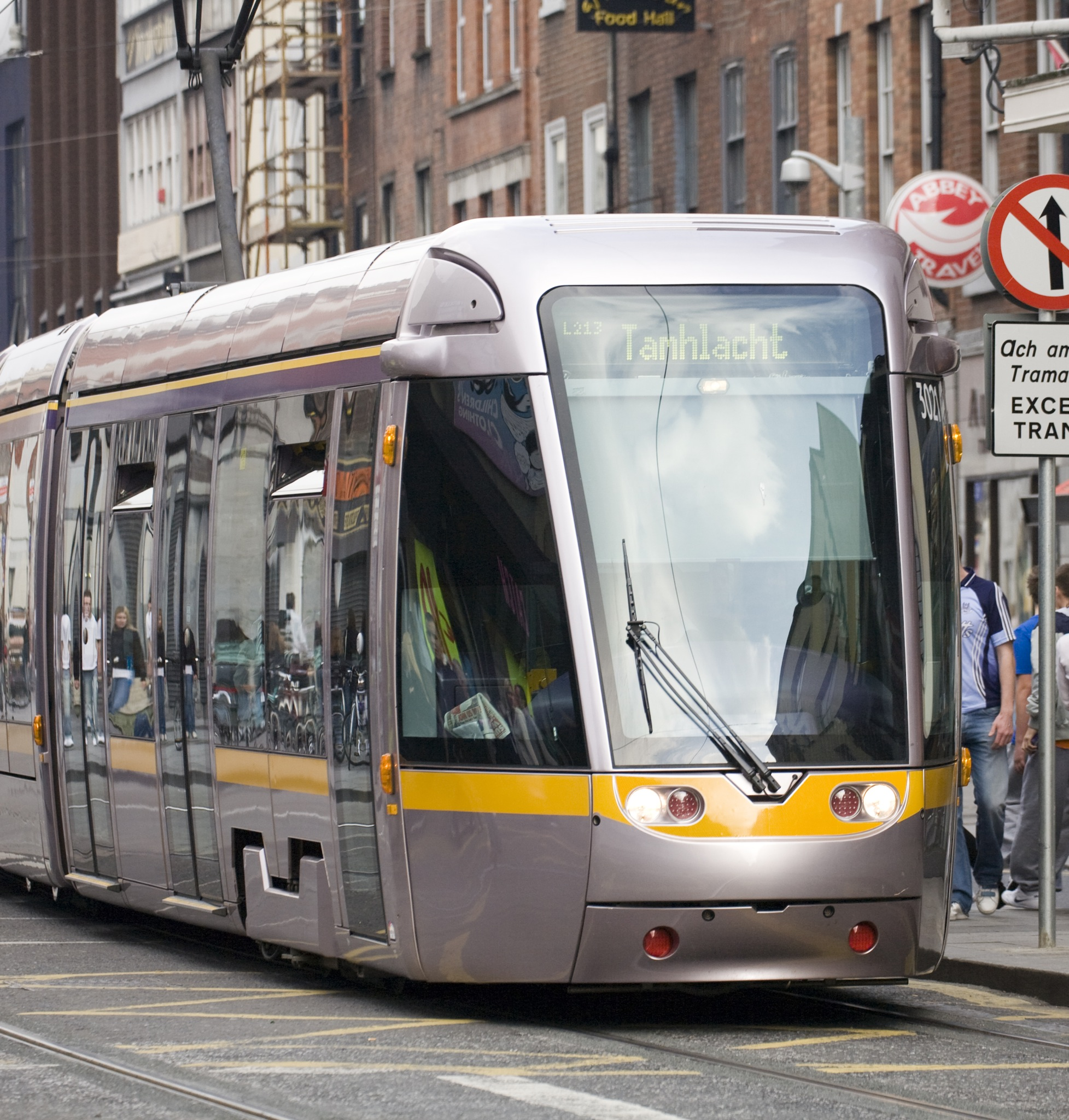
- Red line Luas tram in Dublin city centre

Overview
- Locale: Dublin, Ireland
- Transit type: Tram (or Light rail)
- Number of lines: 2 (Red and Green)
- Number of stations: 67
- Daily ridership: c. 165,000 passengers
- Annual ridership: 55.2 million passengers (2025)
- Website: www.luas.ie www.luasfinglas.ie (extension)

Operation
- Began operation: 30 June 2004; 22 years ago
- Operators: KeolisAmey (from 1 September 2026), Transdev (until 31 August 2026)
- Number of vehicles: 40 Citadis 401 (4000 Class); 41 Citadis 502 (5000 Class)

Technical
- System length: 42.1 kilometres (26.2 mi)
- Track gauge: 1,435 mm (4 ft 8 1/2 in) standard gauge
- Minimum radius of curvature: 25 metres (82 ft)
- Electrification: 750 V DC overhead line
Luas route map
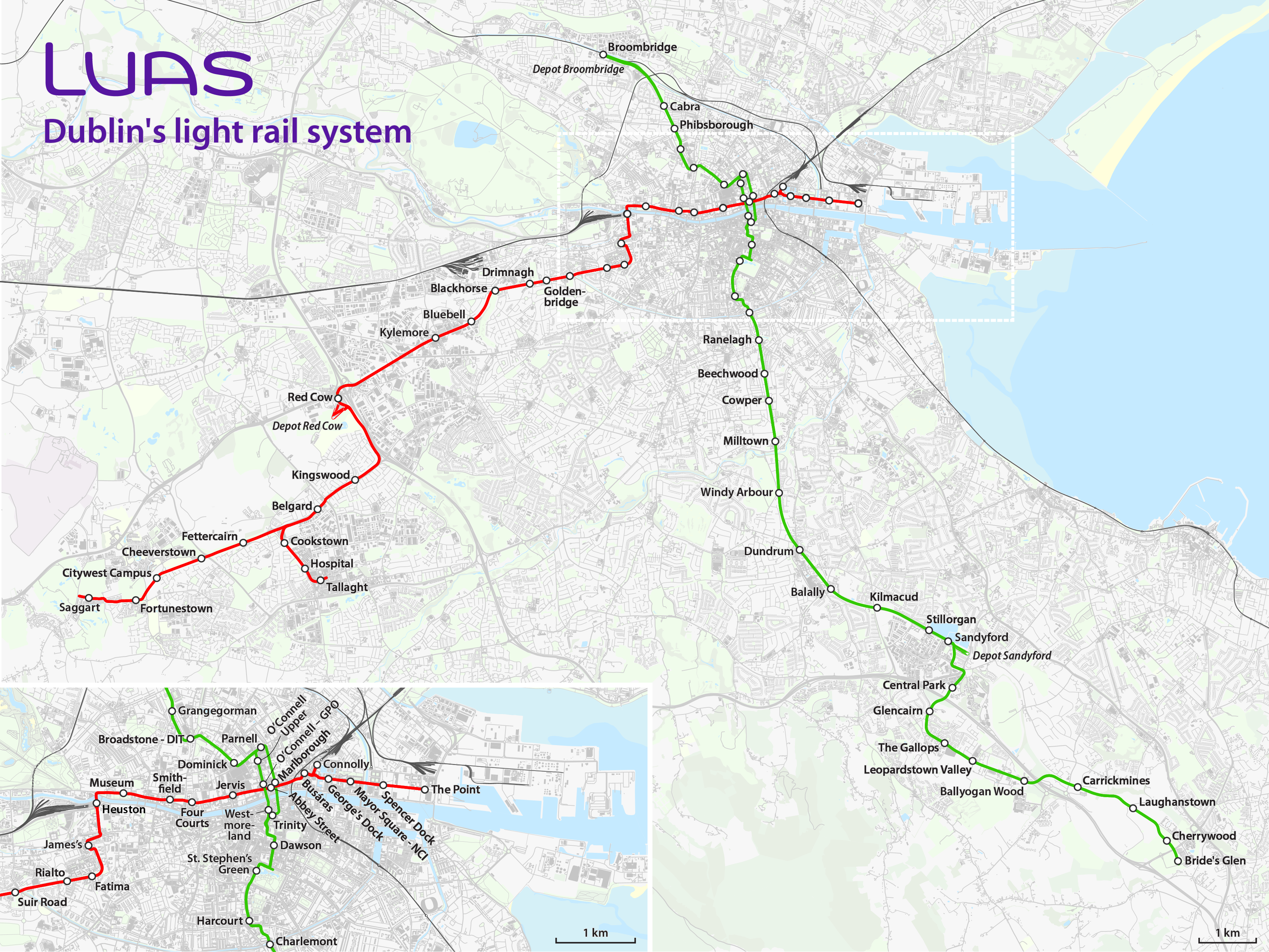

Luas (/ˈluːəs/, Irish: [ˈl̪ˠuəsˠ]; meaning 'speed') is a tram system in Dublin, Ireland. There are two main lines: the Green Line, which began operating on 30 June 2004, and the Red Line which opened on 26 September 2004. Since then, the red line has been extended and split into different branches further out of the city and the green line has been extended north and south as a single line. Since the northern extension of the green line in 2017, the two lines intersect in the city centre. The system now has 67 stops and 42.5 kilometres (26 mi 719 yd) of revenue track, which in 2024 carried 54 million passengers, an increase of 12% compared to 2023. The two lines carried 55 million passengers in 2025.

Luas is operated by the KeolisAmey consortium, having been operated from commencement to August 2026 by Transdev, under tender from Transport Infrastructure Ireland (TII) (prior to the RPA merger with the National Roads Authority to form TII, the tender was originally under the defunct Railway Procurement Agency. The Luas was a major part of the National Transport Authority's strategy (2000–2016). Four extensions to the initial Luas lines have been completed. Construction of a six-kilometre (3 1/2-mile) extension of the Green line through the north city centre to Broombridge, which linked both Green and Red lines, began in June 2013 and opened to passengers in December 2017. This is the extension route previously known officially as BXD.

== History ==
The idea for a new tram or light rail system for the city of Dublin was first suggested, in the 1990s, by a Dublin Transportation Initiative (DTI) report, which referenced the original Dublin tramways, once running over 60 kilometres (37 mi) and reaching most parts of the city. Following this report Córas Iompair Éireann (CIÉ), the state-owned public transport operator in Ireland, was asked to study the different options. They recommended two phases for the construction of a tram system:

- Phase 1: Tallaght to Dundrum/Balally via the City Centre
- Phase 2: Ballymun to the City Centre and Dundrum/Balally to Sandyford.

The Transport Act, 1996 created a legal framework for CIÉ to build a tram system and in May 1997 the company applied for a light railway order to construct the first phase, as well as the Dundrum/Balally to Sandyford part of phase 2.

An inquiry started in July 1997, but was put on hold to investigate the possibility of underground sections in the city centre. In May 1998 the government decided to build two lines, amending the plans. The first was to run from Tallaght to Connolly Station, while the second would run from Sandyford Industrial Estate to Dublin Airport, through the city centre and Ballymun. Part of the second was to be underground through the city centre. In promotional content from the mid-1990s, journey time from Tallaght to the city centre was predicted to be 30 minutes.

The responsibility for developing Luas was transferred from CIÉ to the Railway Procurement Agency (RPA), a separate government agency created in December 2001. Construction work began in March 2001 on the Tallaght to Connolly line, as well as the Sandyford to St. Stephen's Green section of the second line, with Ansaldo of Italy and MVM of Australia getting the contract to build the system. The St. Stephen's Green to Dublin Airport section was dropped before construction began, as it was decided to serve the area by a metro instead. The contract to maintain and operate the system was awarded to Connex.

The development of Luas Red Line was facilitated by European Union funding of €82.5 million under the European Regional Development Fund, and part of the cost of some line extensions (e.g. over 50% of Line B1 to Cherrywood) was raised though levies on development in areas close to the projected route.

=== Launch ===
The original launch date for Luas was to be 2003, but delays in construction saw this date pushed back by a year. An advertising campaign took place to inform the public of the development of the system, while construction was taking place. Construction finished in February 2004 and a period of testing and driver training began. 30 June 2004 was decided on as the official launch date of the Green Line. The first tram went into service for the general public at 3 p.m. Several days of free travel and a family fun weekend took place to launch the system. The Red Line opened on 26 September 2004, with six days of free travel for the general public.

=== 2004 to present ===
By November 2006, over 50 million journeys had been made on the system. Around 90,000 Luas trips are made each day. In 2007, 28.4 million journeys were made; there were 27.4 million journeys in 2008 and 25.4 million journeys in 2009. To date, the busiest day on Luas was Friday, 21 December 2007 when 145,000 passenger journeys were recorded.

Luas operates without a state subsidy. The service recorded a surplus of €985,000 (€680,000 in 2004) – an achievement well ahead of an anticipated deficit of €2.5 million.

On Tuesday, 8 December 2009 the Red Line C1 Connolly to Docklands extension opened. There are four stops: George's Dock, Mayor Square-NCI, Spencer Dock (serving the new Docklands railway station, approximately 350 metres (1,148 ft 4 in) away) and terminating in Point Village, opposite the 3Arena, this extension however bypasses Connolly. Construction started at the beginning of June 2007. Test runs began on the line in September 2009 before the opening.

On 16 October 2010, the B1 extension from Sandyford to Cherrywood opened.

In February 2026, it was revealed that Transdev would lose the concession to operate the Luas later that year, with the new operator being the international consortium KeolisAmey.

==== Luas Cross City ====
In June 2010, plans to join the two Luas tracks were finalised. On 20 May 2011 Dublin City Council made submissions to An Bord Pleanála's Oral Hearing into Line BXD stating that the planning authority had a serious area of concern with the overhead conductor system in the historical city centre, and asking for a wire-free zone.

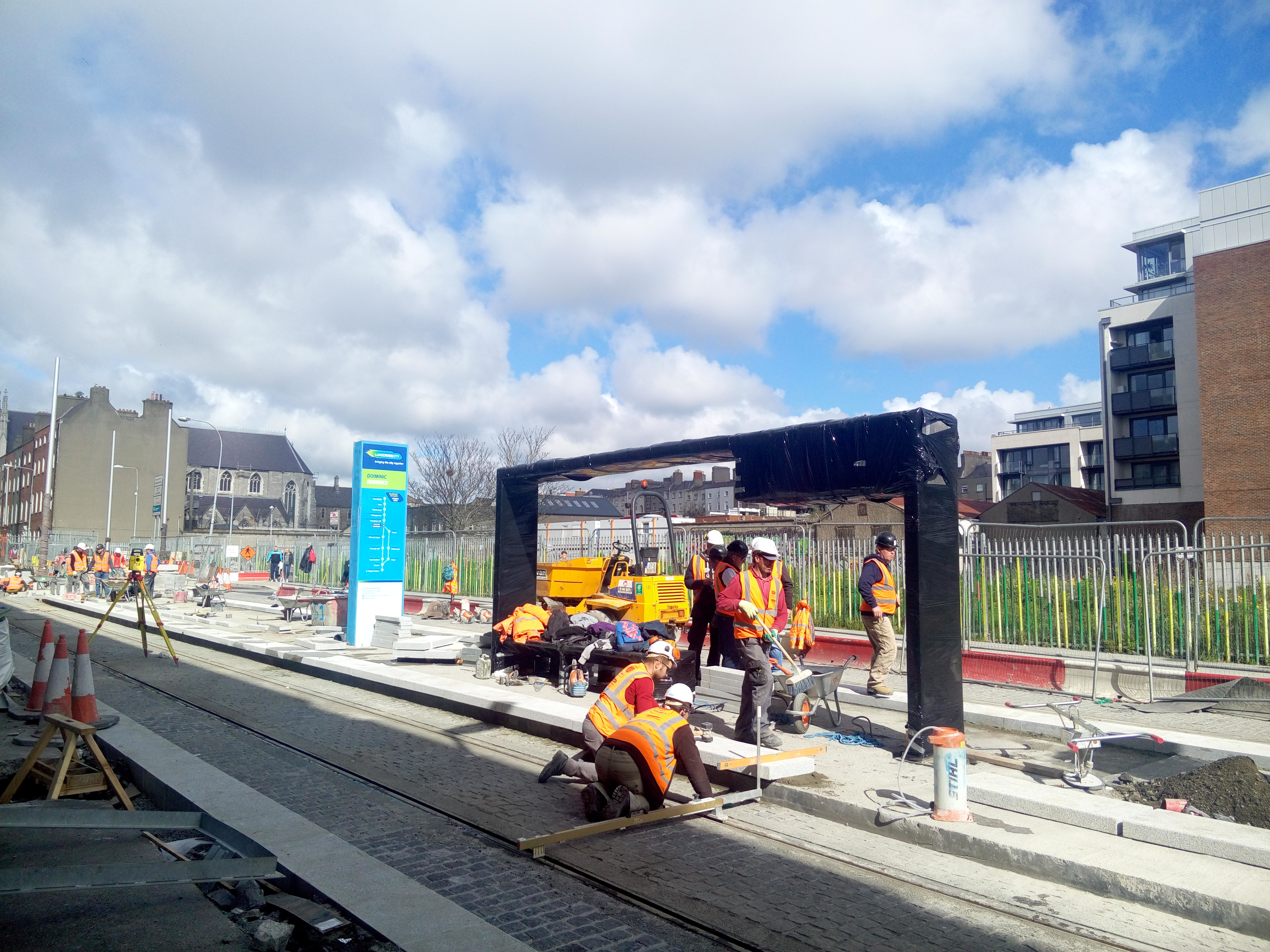
Dominick stop construction site on Luas Cross City line, taken in Dominick Street Lower

Luas Cross City is an extension of the Green Line which links with the Red Line, and continues northwards to Broombridge railway station in North Dublin (where there is an interchange at an Iarnród Éireann station). The extension began at the existing St Stephen's Green Green Line stop. Construction started in June 2013, with services beginning four and a half years later, in December 2017.

- Line BX (includes Line D to Broombridge) – City Centre link for Red and Green Lines. The RPA started public consultation on the route in December 2005. In March 2007 the preferred route was announced. The route runs from St Stephen's Green to College Green where the line changes from a double track to single track. From here it runs north through Westmoreland Street, over O'Connell Bridge and along the west side of O'Connell Street to Cathal Brugha Street. It then turns east into Cathal Brugha Street and turns south to run along Marlborough Street, across the River Liffey on the Rosie Hackett Bridge, continues along Hawkins Street and College Street and joins up with the double-track section of the line at College Green. 2012 was the original completion date given in the Transport 21 plans, but construction only started in 2013. Completion, and commencement of passenger services, occurred in December 2017. The RPA applied for a Railway Order application to An Bord Pleanála for a combined Line D / Line BX Luas Line that runs from St Stephen's Green to Broombridge via the city centre and Broadstone / Grangegorman.
- Line D – City Centre to Liffey Junction. This serves Grangegorman, the site of the new TU Dublin campus. This line is linked with the Maynooth mainline rail line.

On 10 November 2011, the government announced in its 2012–16 Infrastructure and Capital Investment plan that the project to link the Red and Green lines, known as BXD, was to proceed. No other new lines or extensions were being funded. Construction work for the new Rosie Hackett bridge across the River Liffey (connecting Marlborough St and Hawkins St) began in April 2012, on which the southbound Luas BXD track was laid. A Railway Order was granted by An Bord Pleanála for Luas BXD line on 3 August 2012. The project was subsequently branded as Luas Cross City. Cross City opened to passengers on 9 December 2017.

== Infrastructure ==
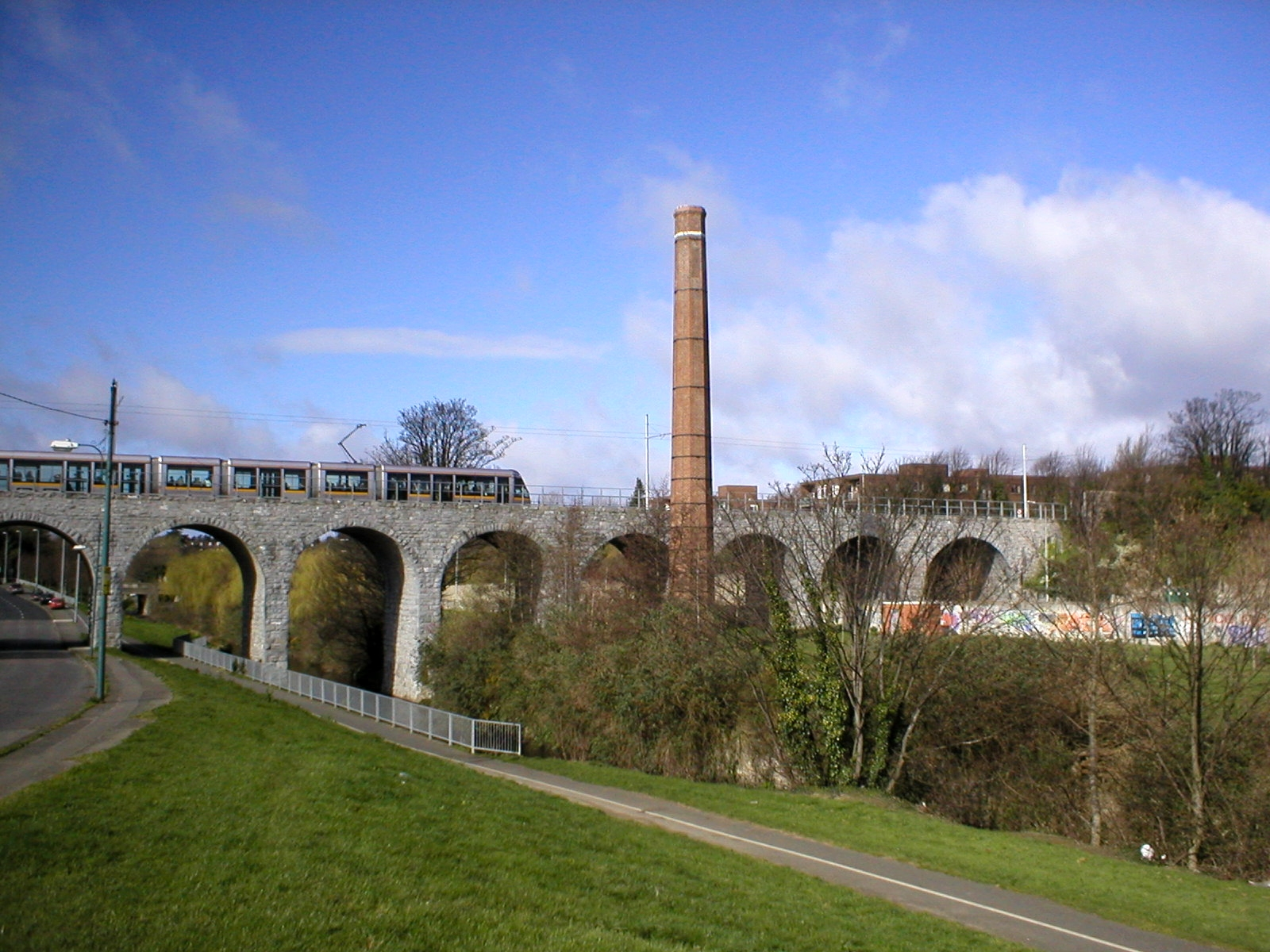
The Nine Arches Bridge on the Green Line at Milltown

=== Stops and lines ===
The network currently comprises two colour-coded lines, one having branches:

1. Red Line – The Point or Connolly to Saggart or Tallaght (each route is approximately 20.7 kilometres (12.9 mi) long, but the total track length is longer since the Belgard-Tallaght and Belgard-Saggart sections are separate parts of the Red Line)
2. Green Line – Broombridge via Sandyford to Bride's Glen, 24.5 kilometres (15.2 mi)

The Red Line runs east–west through Dublin's Northside, then crosses the River Liffey and travels southwest to the heavily populated suburb of Tallaght, with a second branch running through the Citywest campus to terminate at Saggart. It was planned, designed and constructed in two separate stages:

- Line A from Tallaght to Abbey Street
- Line C from Abbey Street to Connolly Station

This was followed by two extensions:

- Line C1 from Connolly to The Point, which opened in December 2009
- Line A1 from Belgard to Saggart, which opened in July 2011

On the south side of Dublin city, the Green Line mostly follows the route of the old Harcourt Street railway line, which was reserved for possible reuse when it closed in 1958, although some diversions have been made. It was known internally as Line B during planning and construction, and has also had several extensions:

- Line B from Sandyford to St Stephen's Green
- Line B1 from Sandyford to Bride's Glen, which opened in July 2010
- Line BX from St Stephen's Green to connect with the Red Line, which opened in December 2017
- Line D extends Line BX to Broombridge, and opened simultaneously with Line BX in December 2017
- Line B2 is a proposed extension from Bride's Glen to Bray

The cost of building the original Red and Green Lines was €728m.

It was envisaged in the original plans that the Green Line would meet the Red Line at O'Connell Street. However, two separate unconnected lines were built, leaving a 1.1 km (0.68 mi) (10–15 minute walk) – through O'Connell Street, Westmoreland Street, College Green and Grafton Street – between the two lines. Plans to link the lines were announced with the proposed building of the BX Line under Transport 21: this was opened to passengers on 9 December 2017. There are 32 stops on the Red Line and 35 (plus two extra unopened stops surrounding Carrickmines) on the Green Line.

A third line to Lucan, known as Line F or Luas Lucan, was planned from an early stage; there had been a tram to Lucan in the era of the Dublin tramways. Development of a preferred route for this line began in 2024.

=== Track and rolling stock ===
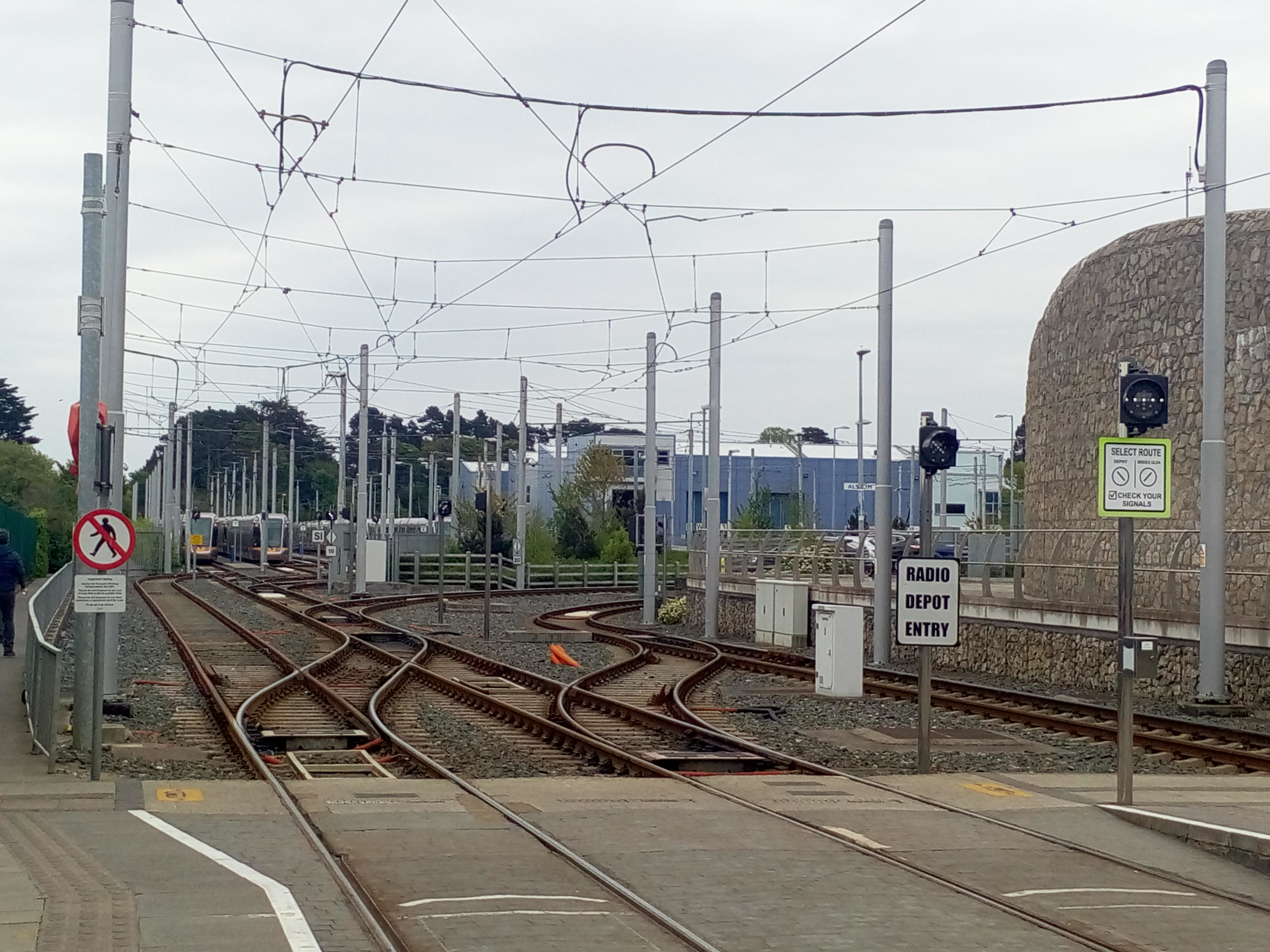
The Luas Park and a junction at Sandyford

The system operates on a 750 V DC overhead power supply. The international standard track gauge of 1,435 mm (4 ft 8 1/2 in) is used, rather than the Irish 1,600 mm (5 ft 3 in).

The silver Alstom Citadis trams, manufactured in La Rochelle, France, reach a top speed of 70 km/h (43 mph) on off-street sections, but travel at a slower speed on-street where conflicts with other vehicles and pedestrians can occur. The 26 initial Red Line '3000' Class trams were 30-metre (98 ft 5 in) long Citadis 301 configurations with a capacity of 256. The 14 initial Green Line '4000 Class' trams, each 40-metre (131 ft 3 in) long Citadis 401 configurations, have a capacity of 358 including two wheelchairs. Starting in 2007, all the Red line trams were upgraded to 40 metres (131 ft 3 in) by inserting two more articulated sections, with the last one converted by June 2008. Both configurations of tramcars are fully compatible with both the Red and the Green Lines.

26 new 43-metre Citadis 402 trams, numbered as the '5000 Class', were ordered for delivery in early 2009. These are 100% low-floor configuration and solely operate on the Green Line, with the 4000 Class trams cascaded to the Red Line after the entire 5000 Class had been introduced.

7, 55-metre (180 ft 5 in) Citadis 502 variants were procured for use on the St. Stephen's Green – Broombridge line. They were brought into service between January and June 2018. These are numbered as members of the 5000 Class. Between 2019 and 2021, all existing 5000 Class units of the Citadis 402 standard have been lengthened to match the Citadis 502 standard with minor differences. 8 further new 502 units were ordered for delivery during 2020, with the first of those entering service in July 2020.

In other aspects, the two lines are identical except that the inter-axis width between the tracks on the Green Line is slightly wider than on the Red Line. The construction planning for the Green Line ensures a distance of track centres at 3,400 millimetres (11 ft 1 7/8 in) including a 400 millimetres (15 3/4 in) extra for the kinematic envelope of metro trains. This does not relate to the track gauge of 1,435 mm (4 ft 8 1/2 in), which is identical on both lines. This will allow wider metro trains be run on the same tracks if a proposed upgrade to full metro service is implemented. This is possible because the route uses an old railway line and as such has few interactions with vehicular or pedestrian traffic. The Railway Procurement Agency has stated (November 2006) that "We still envisage conversion of almost all Luas lines to light metro standard in the long-term". Platform length also varies between lines, with the original 40-metre (131 ft 3 in) platforms lengthened to 55 metres (180 ft 5 in) on the Green Line.

The main engineering structures on the Green Line at present are Milltown Viaduct, also known as The Nine Arches, a large stone viaduct dating from 1854, and the William Dargan Bridge, a large cable-stayed bridge at Taney Cross, near Dundrum town centre.

== Travel on Luas ==
=== Ticketing ===
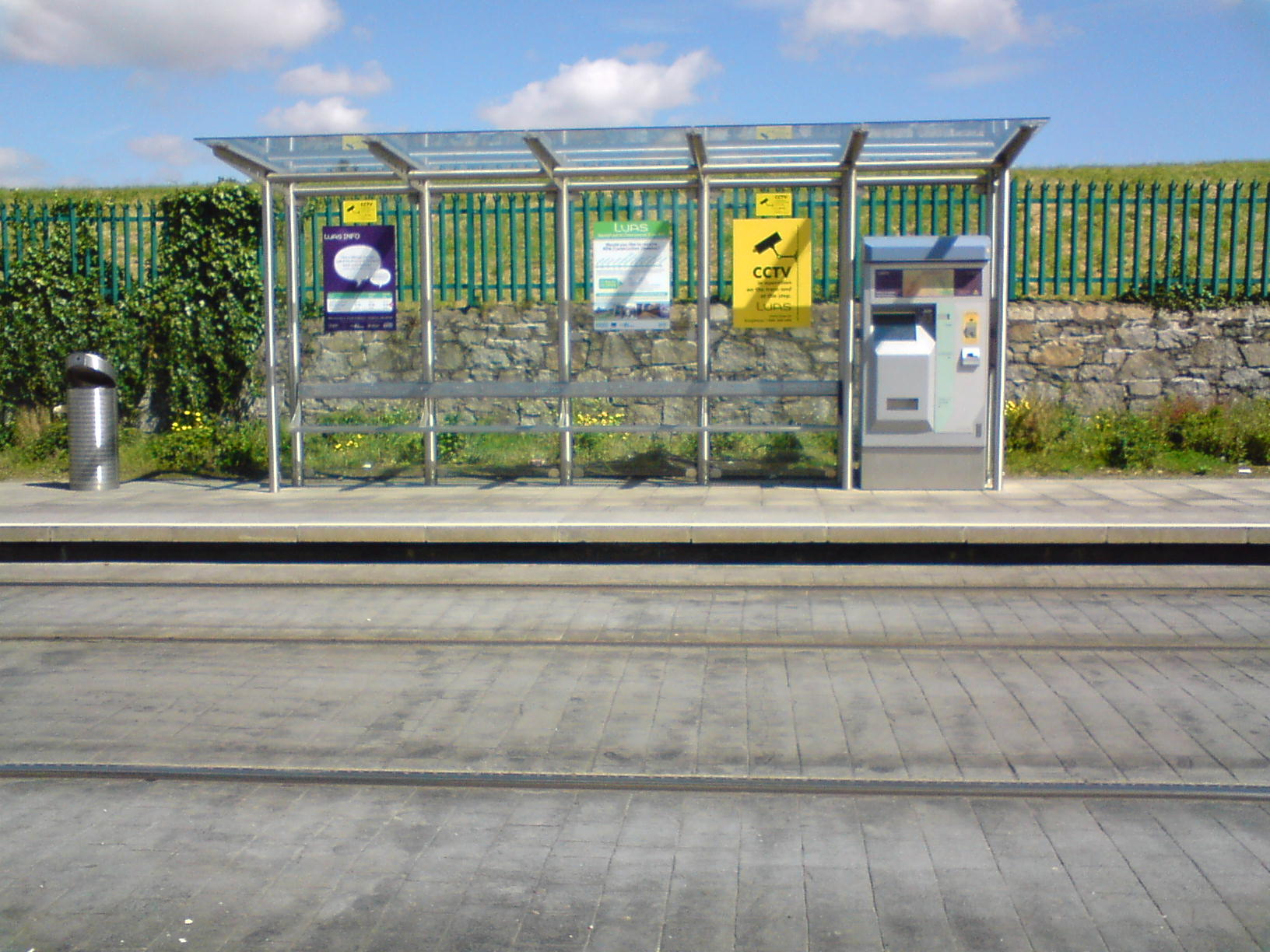
Stillorgan Luas stop with the ticket machine and CCTV warning

Luas tickets are purple in colour and credit card sized. They bear a magnetic stripe on the back although this is not used on Luas. Uniquely among Dublin's public transport, tickets are not checked upon boarding trams; instead, a proof-of-payment system is used.

Ticket machines operate at every Luas stop and these are the only source of single-journey and return tickets. They also sell 1-day, 7-day and 30-day tickets, valid in either some or all the fare zones, for adults, children and students. Combi tickets valid on Dublin Bus and Luas are no longer on general sale, but can be purchased as commuter tickets via the "Taxsaver" scheme, as can various other combinations of bus, Luas, and Iarnród Éireann commuter train service. Certain ticket combinations are not possible (for example a one-day student ticket), and tickets can only be valid from the stop at which they are purchased and must commence their validity within 90 minutes, valid until a specific time shown on the card. Certain tickets require the user to hold an ID card and write the number on the ticket, to prevent the ticket from being transferred to another person. Ticket machines accept card payments (by American Express, MasterCard, or Visa) and have a weekly limit of €150 (upper limit changed from €50 per transaction to €150 per week in January 2012 after upgrading all POS terminals to have a PIN keypad). Formerly €5 was the minimum amount which could be paid via card, but this limit has since been removed. Student tickets can be loaded to a Student Leap card, issued upon verification of student status. No other form of student identification is accepted on Luas.

Tickets cannot be purchased on board the trams. Passengers encountered by a ticket inspector and not in possession of a valid ticket or validated Leap card are issued a fine (referred to as a standard fare) of €100, reduced to €45 for prompt payment. Non-payment within 28 days may result in prosecution.

The lines are divided into 10 zones, five for the green line and four for the red, plus a shared central zone. Most passengers use a Leap card, for which travel within a single zone is charged as a "short journey", with any longer trips charged at a flat fare for 90-minutes travel, including transfers onto bus and train services in the Dublin zone. Paper single and return tickets charge varying fares depending on the number of zones crossed. When the network opened, it was necessary to walk some distance or take another form of transport to connect between the two lines, but nowadays there is a short walking connection between O'Connell - GPO or Marlborough Street on the green line and Abbey Street on the red line.

=== Smartcard ===
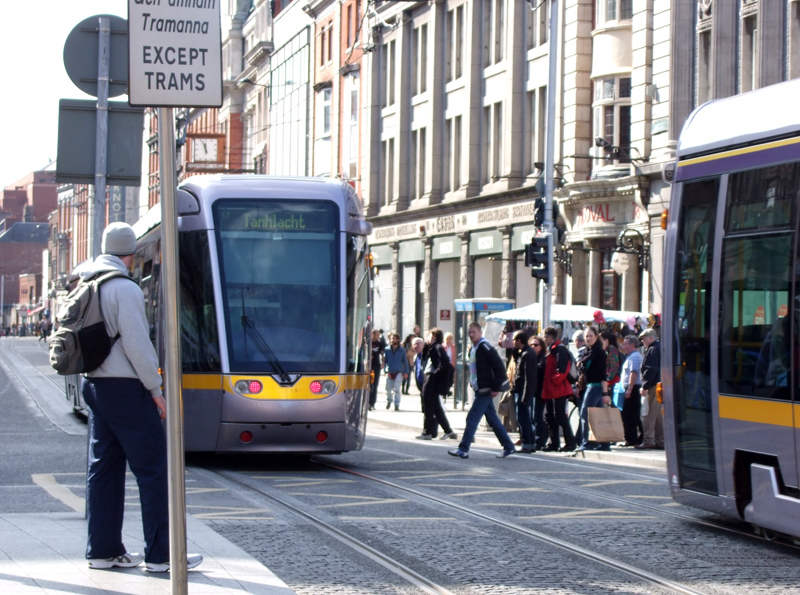
Luas on the Northside

In March 2005, a smartcard for Luas was launched. The smartcard was phased out following launch of the integrated Leap Card which is further detailed below. The final day of Luas Smartcard operations was on 30 September 2014. The Luas smartcard allowed travellers to pay for travel on the Luas network. Credit was pre-loaded onto the smartcard at ticket machines by cash, debit card or credit card, with a minimum top-up of €5 and a maximum credit on the card of €100, and the customer had to validate the card using readers on the platform before boarding the tram and then again after exiting the tram. This is still referred to as 'tag-on' and 'tag-off' on the current Leap Card system.

A smartcard could be purchased at a Luas ticket agent or online. The card cost €10, which included a €3 non-refundable charge for the card, €3 of credit and €4 for a fully refundable 'reserve fund' which allowed travel even if there was insufficient credit on the card for the journey. The card had to be topped up before another journey could be taken.

Smartcard fares were slightly cheaper than standard single and return fares from ticket machines. For example, a journey within a single zone cost €1.25 with the card, compared to €1.50 (€1.60 during peak time) single with a paper ticket, or €2.80 return. Daily, 7-day and 30-day tickets generally worked out cheaper, unless used only rarely. Luas smartcards were unable to store multiple-journey tickets and these tickets were issued on paper only until May 2014, since all tickets have been loaded onto the new Leap Cards.

Until January 2012 there were three different smart-card systems in Dublin: the Luas smart-card, the Dublin Bus prepaid Smartcard system for day-cards or longer and the smart-card for commuter trains and the DART which is -as the Luas card- a per journey tag on/off card but not compatible with Luas cards.

The "Leap Card" smartcard has functionality that it caps the daily and weekly spend to ensure Leap Card holders do not pay more than they would have had they bought day, weekly, or monthly tickets. This functionality had been enabled on Luas and DART services. As of 2017, the National Transport Authority reported the number of Leap Card users was 2.5 million.

=== Free travel ===
Irish residents receiving the following Social Welfare payments are provided with a Public Services Card with yellow "FT" in the top right-hand corner, which functions as a smart card in the same way as a Leap Card, but allows free travel:

- Pension (senior citizens over 66)
- Disability Allowance (persons with a disabling medical condition lasting longer than a year approved by a general practitioner, a departmental medical officer or a departmental welfare officer)
- Carers Allowance

Certain claimants may also receive free travel for a spouse or for any adult companion.

Visitors to Ireland are not in-scope of the free travel scheme.

The free travel system was created by Ministerial Order (not an Act of the Oireachtas as with many such schemes) by then Minister for Health, Charles J Haughey in the late 1960s and is considered a 'third rail' politically.

=== Hours of operation and frequency ===
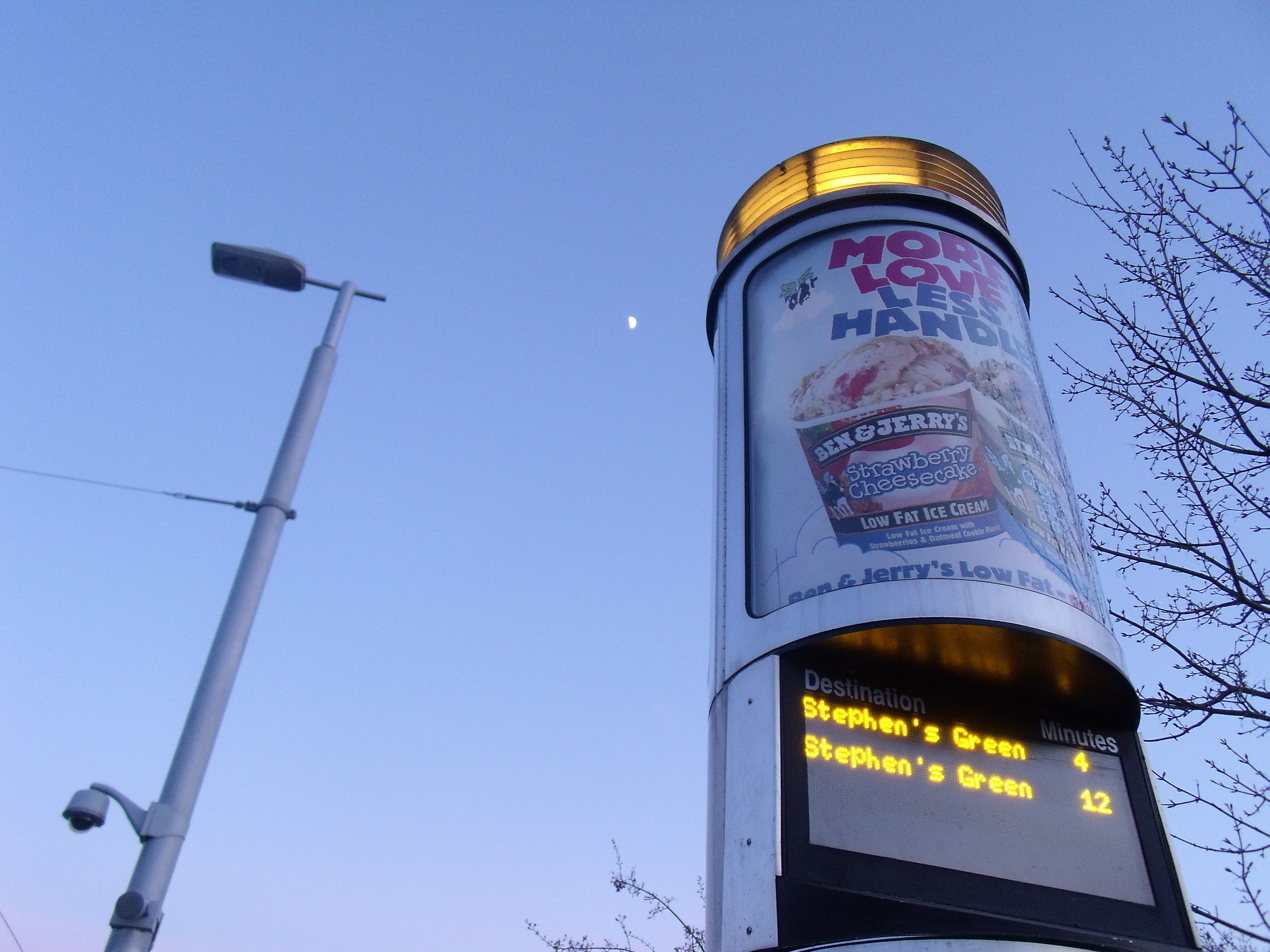
Electronic sign at a Luas stop indicating the minutes until the next tram.

Trams operate from 05:30 to 00:30 Monday to Friday. On Saturday services run from 06:30 to 00:30, while on Sundays it is only from 07:00 to 23:30. Public holidays are the same as Sundays, except trams run until 00:30. Services run at regular intervals, from every 4–5 minutes during peak times to every 15 minutes late at night.

During the Christmas season (from early December to the last weekend before Christmas), a night service runs on Luas during Friday and Saturday nights (as well as on New Year's Eve), with the last trams departing the city centre at 03:30. However, fares are priced at a premium of €5 single (€4 on Leap Cards).

==== Night Luas ====
In 2016 while Dublin Bus was considering plans for the rolling out of its 24-hour bus service, a spokesperson for Transdev revealed that the company had looked at extending the Christmastime 'Night Luas' to operate every weekend of the year, but that "realistically, the demand for services is just not there [and that] the service just wouldn’t be financially viable."

In June 2022, Transport Minister Eamon Ryan asked the National Transport Authority to again re-examine the prospect of running Luas services on a 24-hour basis. The NTA responded by saying that a significant extension of the tram system was "not something that should be progressed at this point" noting that essential maintenance on the tram system - such as on its overhead cable systems, overhead line equipment and rail works - can only be carried out when all trams are out of service. The Authority pointed to its increased night bus services which have been coming online in recent years arguing that the delivery of 24-hour services across the bus network "is more feasible". Fine Gael TD Neale Richmond pointed out that as well as more 24-hour Dublin Bus services, late-night Luas services are "badly needed [..] given the persisting issues with access to taxis in Dublin city centre". "This is becoming a public safety issue with many people being forced to walk home, often alone, late at night as public transport is not operating and taxis are hard to come by," he added.

=== Accessibility ===
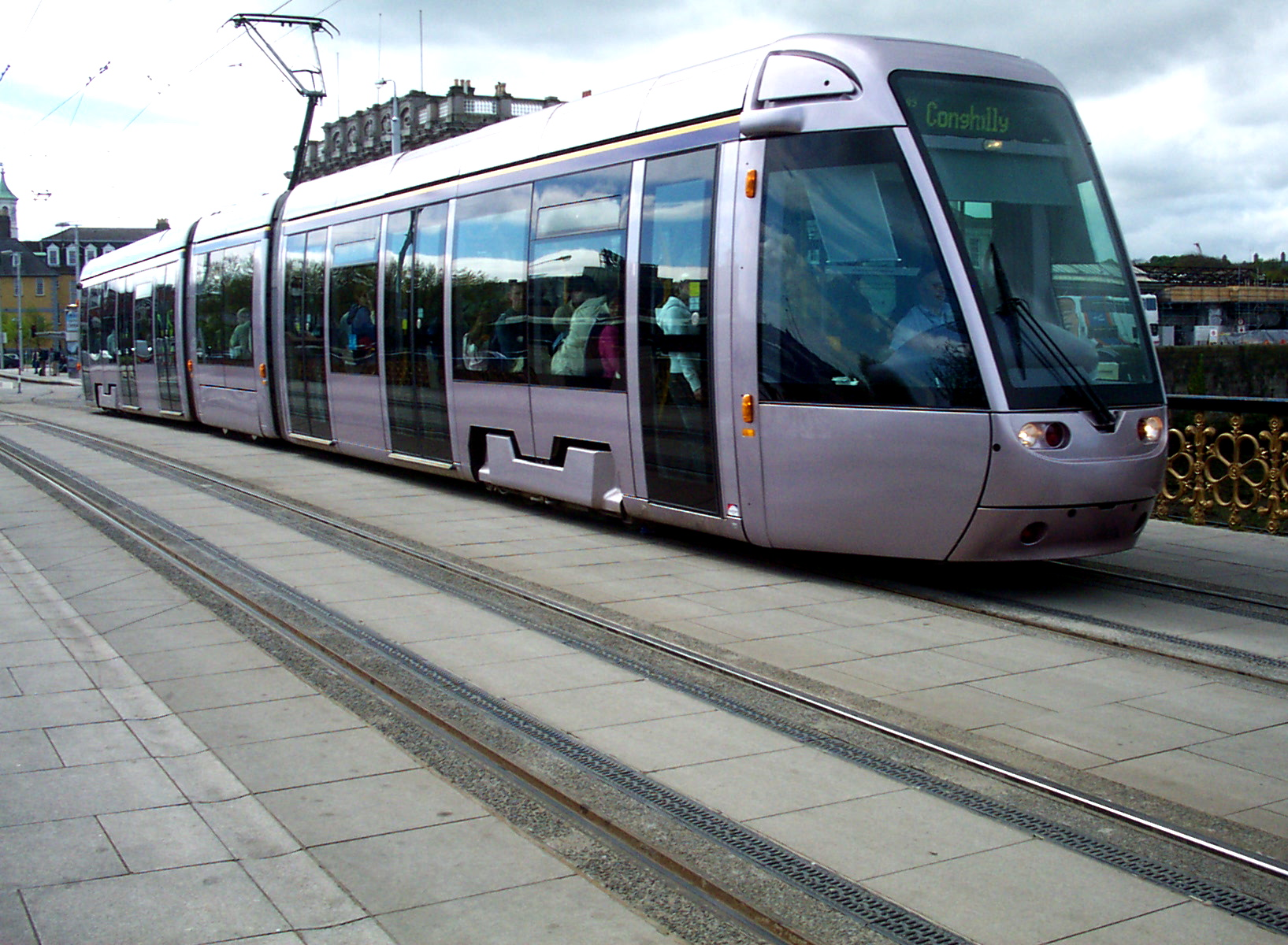
Luas tram crossing the Liffey (a yellow stripe around the trams has since been added to improve visibility)

The low floors and wide spaces of the Citadis trams mean that wheelchair users can easily board. All stops have also been designed with ramps, to allow easy access. Several have lifts, such as Kilmacud and Dundrum on the Green Line, while Connolly Station has escalators that connect the Luas stop to the main station building. The website for Luas also has an accessibility newsletter.

=== Safety ===
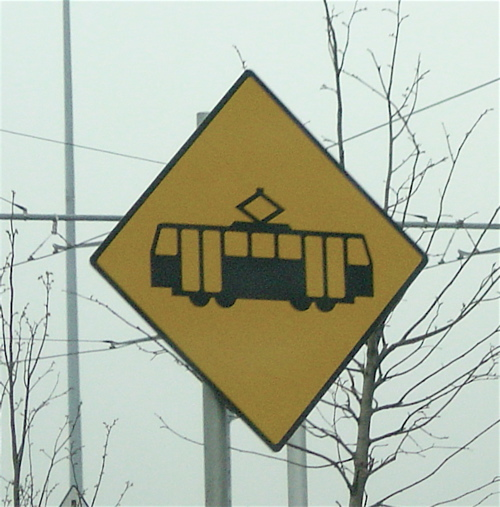
Sign warning of Luas track ahead

Before Luas was launched, a Safety Awareness Day was held in Dublin city centre. Thousands of reflective armbands were distributed to pedestrians and cyclists, in order to ensure their visibility for tram drivers. This policy seems to have worked as Luas has been described as being "one of the safest transport systems in the world". Both trams and stops are monitored using CCTV 24 hours a day from the central control room, located in the Red Cow Depot.

Before Luas was launched, it was feared that the tram system would lead to a high number of fatal accidents. As of 2022, however, there have been approximately 10 fatalities. There have been many occurrences of cars striking trams, mainly caused by motorists breaking red lights. On 16 September 2009, a Luas collided with a Dublin Bus at the O'Connell Street-Abbey Street Junction. In the collision, 22 people were injured, three of them seriously, including the tram driver. Early investigations suggested that the bus had the green light to move, and that the Luas must have had technical problems. The Luas driver was later charged with dangerous driving, causing harm and operating a tram in a manner which posed risk to others. He was subsequently acquitted of dangerous conduct by the Dublin Circuit Criminal Court.

=== Security ===
Security on Luas trams, platforms and facilities is provided directly by the system operator. Luas Security Officers patrol the system to counter anti-social or other incidents, and intervene in incidents prior to the arrival of the Gardaí. Luas Security Officers wear tactical uniforms and stab-resistant body vests.

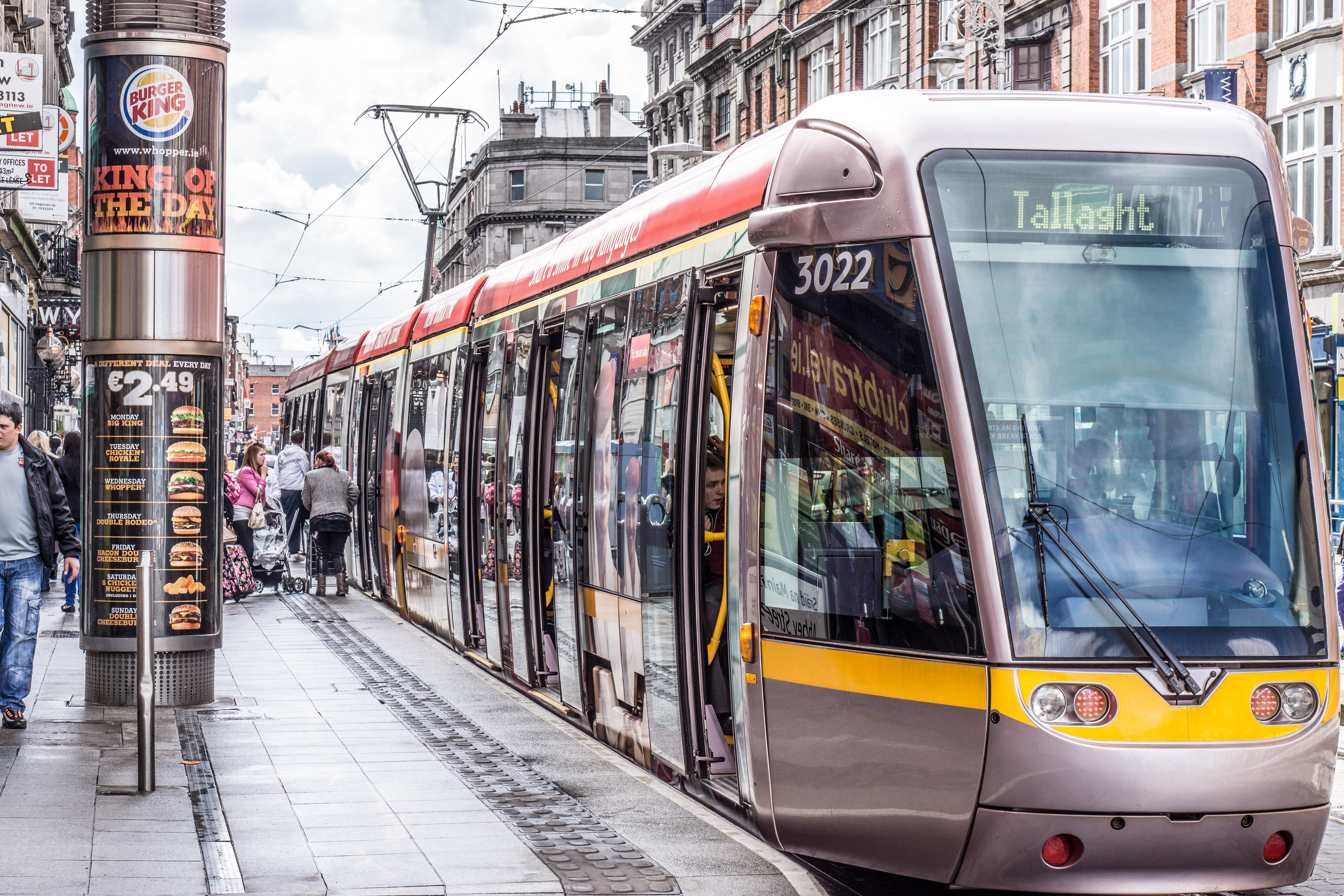
Luas tram stop at Abbey Street

== Incidents and criticism ==
There have been several incidents involving Luas, often leading to its temporary closure. As of September 2022, this included ten fatal incidents, with approximately 540 million passengers carried.

On 17 March 2012, a fire in buildings on Benburb Street resulted in Red Line services being suspended in the city centre until 24 March 2012. Other fires in buildings adjacent to the Red Line have led to shorter closures from time to time.

On 7 November 2013 a flash fire occurred on a tram as it approached Busáras stop. There were no injuries and the damage to the Tram was minor. There had been a similar fire in 2008.

Park and ride charges have also attracted criticism. As of 2022 the cost of parking for a full day is between €2 and €5. It was described by former government Teachta Dála and head of the Dáil transport Committee Eoin Ryan as "unacceptable for Luas to charge passengers for parking at their Park and Ride facilities on top of ticket fares". On 8 February 2018 there were traffic delays in south Dublin because the longer 55 metre tram was too long for O'Connell bridge, when it was obstructed by a taxi blocking a junction.

In August 2021, the tweet, "A long-term goal of mine has been to lead a disinformation campaign which claims that the Luas is free until enough people believe it that they have no choice but to give in and make the Luas is free," by journalist Carl Kinsella, resulted in a cascade of tweets, memes and posters improperly claiming the Luas was free of charge. The consequences of the effects of the Irish Twitter had to be dealt with by Luas' workers, Transdev issuing a statement to confirm that this is not the case and ticketless travellers face a €100 fine.

During the 2023 Dublin Riot, a Green Line tram was set alight on O'Connell St, causing "extensive damage to overhead power line" in the process, including on Westmoreland Street. The following day, Red Line services were unable to operate east of Smithfield, and Green Line services north of St. Stephen's Green. The tram was towed back to Broombridge depot in the early afternoon. In October 2025, a man was convicted of rioting and setting the Luas on fire. He was jailed for three years.

=== Accidents and deaths ===
In February 2008, a pedestrian was struck by a tram at Cookstown Way in Tallaght, sustaining serious head injuries and dying in hospital the following day. In May 2009, a worker died at Citywest during the construction of the Luas A1 extension to Saggart.

In September 2009 a Red Line Luas tram and a double-decker number 16 Dublin Bus collided at the crossing of Abbey Street and O'Connell Street in central Dublin. The front section of the tram was derailed in the incident and the driver's cabin was crushed flat against the left hand side of the bus. At least 21 people were injured and three were seriously hurt, including the driver of the tram who had to be cut out from the wreckage.

In October 2011, a man was struck and killed by a Red Line tram on Steeven's Lane near Heuston Station. In June 2012, a woman was struck by a Luas tram in Inchicore, after falling onto the tracks at Blackhorse platform as a tram pulled in. She was caught between the platform and tram, and suffered severe head and body trauma. Emergency services managed to free her from under the tram, and the area was cordoned off for a forensic examination. She was rushed to hospital, and died of her injuries on 6 July 2012. As of 2019, she is the only Luas passenger (counted as a passenger, as she had intended to travel on the tram) to have died in a collision incident.

On 7 April 2014, a car collided with a Luas tram at the junction of Jervis Street and Abbey Street, and was caused to fatally strike a pedestrian who was pronounced dead at the scene. On 8 July 2017, a woman died after being struck by a city centre-bound Luas tram at St. James Walk, just past the Fatima stop, in Rialto. On 14 February 2019 a woman was struck and killed on a Tallaght bound tram between the Cookstown and Tallaght Hospital stops. She was pronounced dead at the scene. On 11 March 2019, a male pedestrian was struck and killed near the Kingswood stop. In December 2019, a male cyclist died in a collision with a tram at Peter's Place.

In September 2022, a pedestrian died after he was struck by a tram between the Cabra and Broombridge stops, and in June 2026, a pedestrian died after he was struck by a tram on Marlborough Street.

=== Ransomware cyberattack ===
In January 2019 the website was compromised with a message threatening to "publish all data and send emails to your users" unless 1 Bitcoin was paid in five days.

Transdev took the site offline on Thursday 3 January 2019. At the time of the attack one bitcoin was worth €3,385. That afternoon they said that the records affected were those of people who had signed up to a Luas newsletter and that those people would be contacted in the next 24 hours to inform them of the breach. No financial records had been compromised. The Data Protection Commissioner and Garda National Economic Crime Bureau were both notified of the attack.

== Future ==
In January 2023 the transport strategy for the Greater Dublin Area 2022-2042 was published. It details four extensions to the existing LUAS system to be delivered in its term:

- Extension of the Green Line north to Finglas to be delivered in the medium term (2031–2036)
- New Line to Lucan (2031–2036)
- Extension of the Green Line south to Bray (2031–2036).
- Extension of the Red Line to Poolbeg to be delivered before 2042.

It also proposes up to 8 new lines and extensions, some previously proposed, to be delivered post-2042 with the NTA to "undertake detailed appraisal, planning and design work" in that 20 year time frame. Those lines are:

1. City Centre to Clongriffin
2. City Centre to Beaumont and Balgriffin
3. Green Line Extension to Tyrrelstown
4. City Centre to Blanchardstown
5. Red Line Reconfiguration to provide the following lines:
  1. Clondalkin-City Centre;
  2. Tallaght-Kimmage-City Centre.
6. Tallaght to City Centre via Knocklyon;
7. Green Line Reconfiguration to provide the following lines:
  1. City Centre to Bray via UCD and Sandyford
  2. Sandyford to City Centre
  3. Sandyford to Cherrywood via Foxrock (suggested but unconfirmed)

The plan also examines the potential for an orbital LUAS, declaring that its alignment(s) should be specified and protected in the later half of the plan. Other upgrades to the system such as new stops, expanded depots, and improved security are also mentioned.

=== Other proposed lines and extensions ===
- Line F1/2 – City Centre to Lucan. On 27 September 2007, Noel Dempsey (Minister for Transport) launched the public consultation process for the planned Luas line to Lucan. Two main route options where identified, with a number of sub-options also identified. It was expected that would link with the proposed Metro West. The preferred route was announced in November 2008 and the RPA where planning the precise alignment and station and depot locations. The planning for the two lines was split in two. Line F1 was to be the line from Lucan to where it will connect with the existing red line at Blackhorse and Line F2 will be where the line was to leave the existing red line at James and continue on to College Green. Plans for the line are expected to be published by early 2027.
- Luas Finglas – A 4 km (2.5 mi) extension from Broombridge through Finglas to Charlestown Shopping Centre was announced in 2020, with a possible operating date of 2028. A public consultation was launched in July 2020. In November 2021, RTÉ News reported that the line would not be complete until after 2031. In October 2024, The Irish Times reported that Minister for Transport Eamon Ryan would seek cabinet approval for the completion of the line before 2031. In June 2026, the Irish Times reported that Minister Darragh O'Brien suggested that construction could begin in 2028.
- Line B2 – Cherrywood to Bray environs extension (Green Line). This is a proposed extension of 6.8 km (4.2 mi). On 6 June 2007, the route of this Luas extension was announced. It is proposed to run from Brides Glen to Fassaroe and Bray (adjacent to the DART station), and will run very close to the M11 motorway, eventually crossing it near the Wilford interchange. This extension was postponed in 2009 due to the Post-2008 Irish economic downturn, and while it has been proposed again in the decade since, as of October 2020, Minister Ryan confirmed the extension will not commence in the short term, but could be proposed in the future after the extension to Finglas.

=== Rejected projects ===
- Line E – In May 2008, the feasibility study for a possible Luas line E, to run from Dundrum to the City Centre via Rathfarnham, Terenure and Harold's Cross, was completed. The line was found to be feasible and it was submitted to the Minister for Transport but was rejected on being found uneconomic to operate.

=== Other projects ===
Following the introduction of Luas in Dublin, there is support to bring trams to other Irish cities. During the 2007 election campaign, Fianna Fáil and the Green Party both announced plans for tram systems in Cork, Limerick, Galway, Waterford and Bray. The 2007 Programme for Government between these two parties and the Progressive Democrats included feasibility studies on these projects within the first two years of the government. Cork and Limerick were expected to complete their studies by "mid 2009". As a result of the financial crisis beginning in 2008, a moratorium was placed on future capital projects; as such, no feasibility studies have been completed as of 2017.

In 2018 a revived campaign for a Galway LUAS or "GLUAS" was launched, receiving support from Independent TD and future President Catherine Connolly. The campaign claims a 21 km very light rail line with trains every five minutes could be installed for as little as €200 million, and make a major contribution to reducing Galway's traffic. The denial of planning permission for the Galway's second ring-road in 2022 is likely to add pressure to solve the area's traffic problems.

In May 2019, plans were revealed for a Luas-style system in Cork. The system would consist of a 17 kilometres (11 mi) long line with 25 stops from Ballincollig to Mahon Point. The project was re-announced in April 2025.

== See also ==
- Transport in Ireland
- List of Irish companies
- Public transport operators in Dublin
- Dublin United Transport Company (pre-1950 operator of Dublin's original tram system)
- Trams in Europe
