= Charlestown Shopping Centre =

Shopping centre in Dublin, Ireland

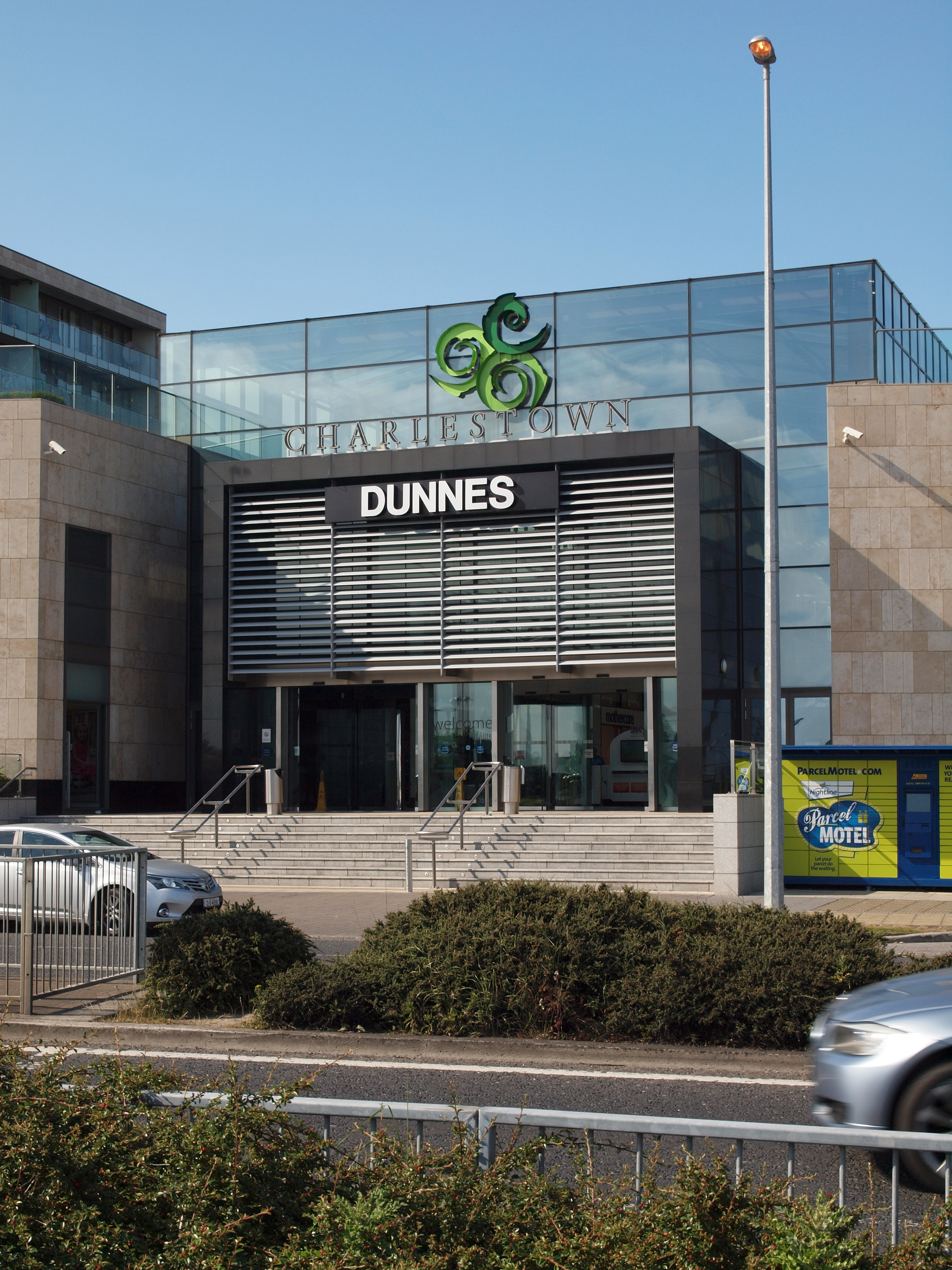
- Location: Dublin, Ireland
- Coordinates: 53.4039°N 6.3031°W
- Address: St. Margaret's Road, Dublin 11
- Opened: October 2007
- Floors: 2: Retail, 5: Apartments
- Website: charlestowncentre.ie

Charlestown Shopping Centre is a shopping centre located on St. Margaret's Road, Dublin, Ireland, north of Finglas village. It opened in October 2007.

== Shops ==
Dunnes Stores is the anchor tenant; other tenants include Sports Direct, Boots and Eddie Rocket's, Card Factory, and David Cullen Jewellers.

== Later phases ==
Phase two of the shopping centre opened in October 2015. It consisted of a nine screen Odeon cinema, and a Leisureplex which includes bowling and Quasar facilities. Phase three consisted of 3 car showrooms and opened in 2019.

== Transport ==
The shopping centre is served by Dublin Bus routes 23, 24, F1, F2, F3 and L89 as well as Go-Ahead Ireland route N6.

A Luas extension has been proposed to serve the shopping centre, extended from the current Green Line terminus at Broombridge. However, the project has failed to secure funding.
