= Drimnagh =

Suburb of Dublin, Ireland

Drimnagh Droimeanach (Irish)
- Suburb
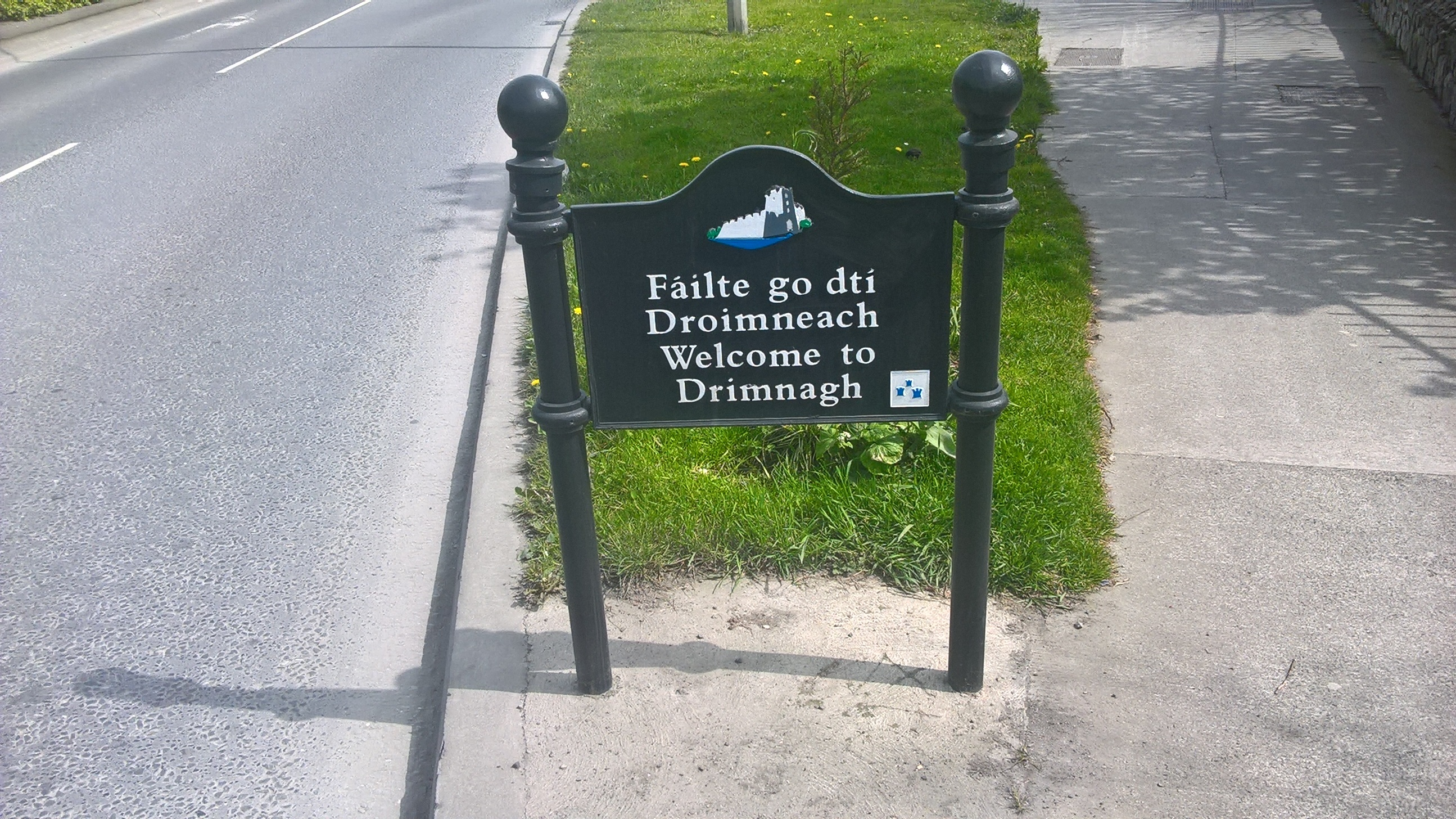
- Drimnagh welcome signage
- Interactive map of Drimnagh
- Location in Ireland
- Coordinates: 53°19′35″N 6°19′08″W
- Country: Ireland
- Province: Leinster
- Local government area: Dublin City Council
- Eircode routing key: D12

Drimnagh (Irish: Droimeanach) is a suburb in Dublin, Ireland. It lies to the south of the city between Walkinstown, Crumlin and Inchicore, bordered by the Grand Canal to the north and east. Drimnagh is in postal district Dublin 12. Drimnagh is in a townland and civil parish of the same name, in the barony of Uppercross.

== History ==
=== Early to medieval ===
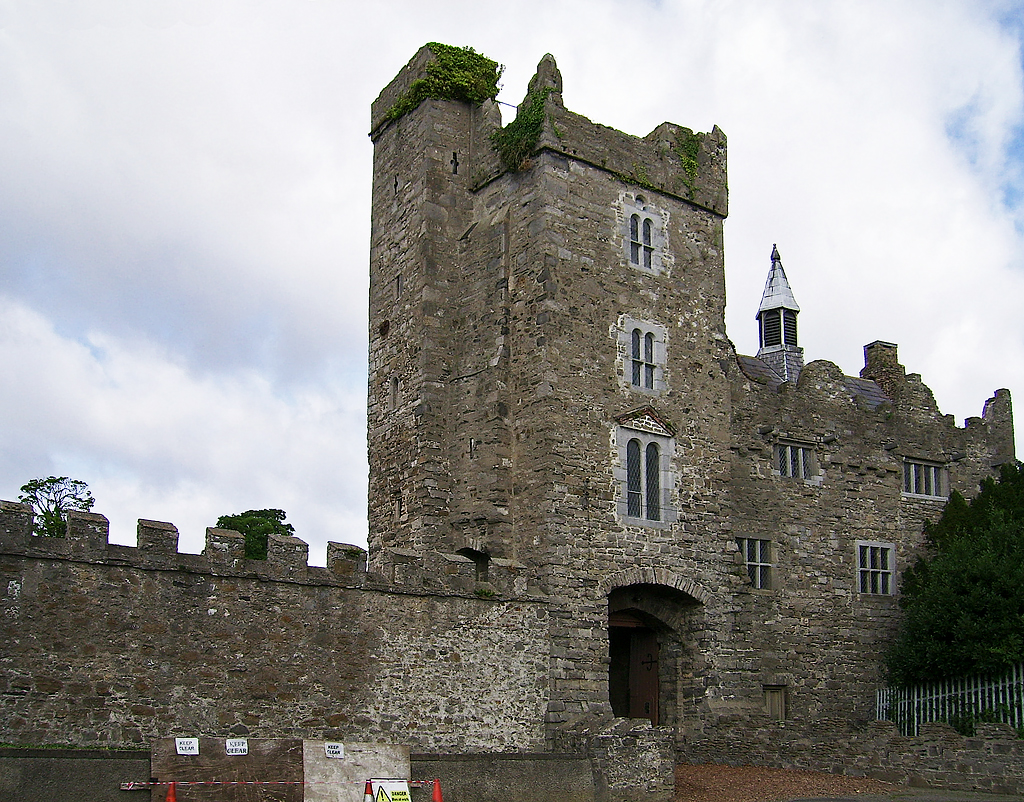
Drimnagh Castle

Video about Drimnagh Castle

Drimnagh derives its name from the word druimneach, or country with ridges. A Neolithic settlement discovered and a funerary bowl found in a burial site. The site was demolished, but the bowl is on view in the National Museum.

The lands of Drimnagh were taken from their Irish owners by Richard de Clare, 2nd Earl of Pembroke (Strongbow), who gave them to the Barnwell family, who had arrived in Ireland with Strongbow in 1167 and had settled in Berehaven in Munster. The family were killed in Munster, except for Hugh de Barnwell, who was given lands at Drimnagh as compensation. The area was considered safe, as it was relatively far away from the Irish strongholds in the Wicklow Mountains.

Drimnagh Castle, which was first built by the Barnwell family in the 12th century, is the only castle in Ireland which still has a moat encircling it. It is one of Dublin's few remaining medieval castles.

The medieval story of the Abbot of Drimnagh was set in Drimnagh and nearby Crumlin.

=== 20th century ===
Drimnagh was farmland until the mid-1930s, when some of the first tenement clearances brought city centre residents from one-room hovels to terraced and semi-detached houses in a series of roads named after the mountain ranges of Ireland. The suburb consists of one area close to Drimnagh Castle and Lansdowne Valley, with three-bedroom private housing built by Associated Properties, and another area (the larger part) built by Dublin Corporation and consisting of three-bedroom 'kitchen houses' and two-bedroom 'parlour houses' bordering the Grand Canal and Crumlin. The two areas meet at the parish church, the Church of Our Lady of Good Counsel (Mourne Road Church), in the centre of Drimnagh, which was built in 1943.

Our Lady's Children's Hospital, Crumlin opened in the area in 1956.

The Dublin Corporation housing area was originally considered part of an area known as North Crumlin from its construction in the mid-1930s until the introduction of the postal code system during the mid-1970s.

== Transport ==
=== Tram ===
Drimnagh is on the Red Line of the Luas tram system. The area is served by Blackhorse, Drimnagh, Goldenbridge and Suir Road Luas stops.

=== Bus ===
The Drimnagh area is served by Dublin Bus routes 27, 56A, 77A, 77X, 122, 150 and 151. It is also served by Go-Ahead Ireland routes 73, S2 and S4.

== Education ==
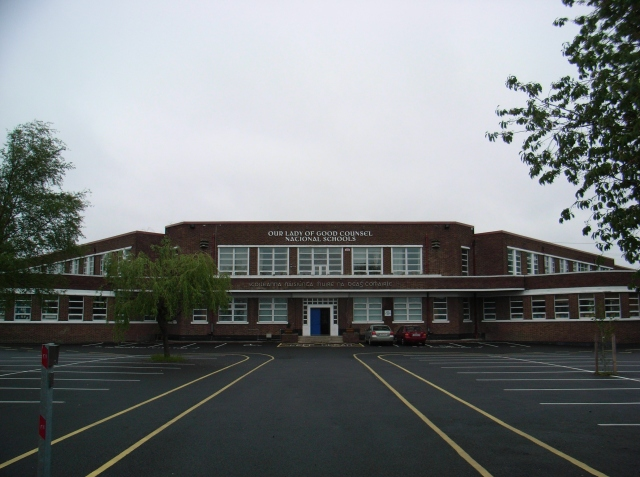
Our Lady of Good Counsel National School, Drimnagh.

Drimnagh Castle CBS is a primary and secondary school for boys which was built in 1954 next to the site of Drimnagh Castle. Notable students to have attended the school include: politician Charlie O'Connor; footballers Kevin Moran, Niall Quinn, Dean Delany and Graham Barrett; and radio presenter Rick O'Shea.

Two national (primary) schools, Our Lady of Good Counsel Boys National School and Our Lady of Good Counsel Girls National School, are also based in Drimnagh.

== Sport ==
The local Gaelic Athletic Association (GAA) clubs include Good Counsel GAA (which has been in the Drimnagh area since 1954) and St James Gaels GAA (based at the Iveagh Grounds).

Also based at the Iveagh Grounds is Guinness Rugby Football Club.

Association football (soccer) clubs in the area include Mourne Celtic, Drimnagh Celtic and St. John Bosco. Drimnagh Boxíng Club is located on Keeper Road.

== Notable people ==
- Patrick Bergin, actor
- Gabriel Byrne, actor
- Patricia Cahill, singer
- Michael Carruth, boxer, boxed for Drimnagh but is from Greenhills
- Frank Clarke, Chief Justice of Ireland
- Eamonn Coghlan, athlete
- Aisling Daly, MMA
- Dean Delany, footballer
- Alan Dukes, former Fine Gael leader, born in the area
- Tom Dunne, musician, broadcaster
- Tony Dunne, footballer
- Jimmy Holmes, footballer
- Patrick Kavanagh, Olympic footballer
- James Keane, musician
- Seán Keane, fiddle player of The Chieftains
- Brian Kerr, former Irish international football team manager
- Kevin Moran, footballer
- Rick O'Shea, broadcaster
- Seán Potts, musician
- Jonathan Rhys Meyers, actor and musician
- Enda Stevens, footballer
- Philip Sutcliffe Snr, two-time Olympic boxer
- Luke Turner, footballer
- Colm Wilkinson, actor and singer

== See also ==
- List of towns and villages in Ireland
