= Waterhouse Byrne Baird Shield =

Irish club cross-country event

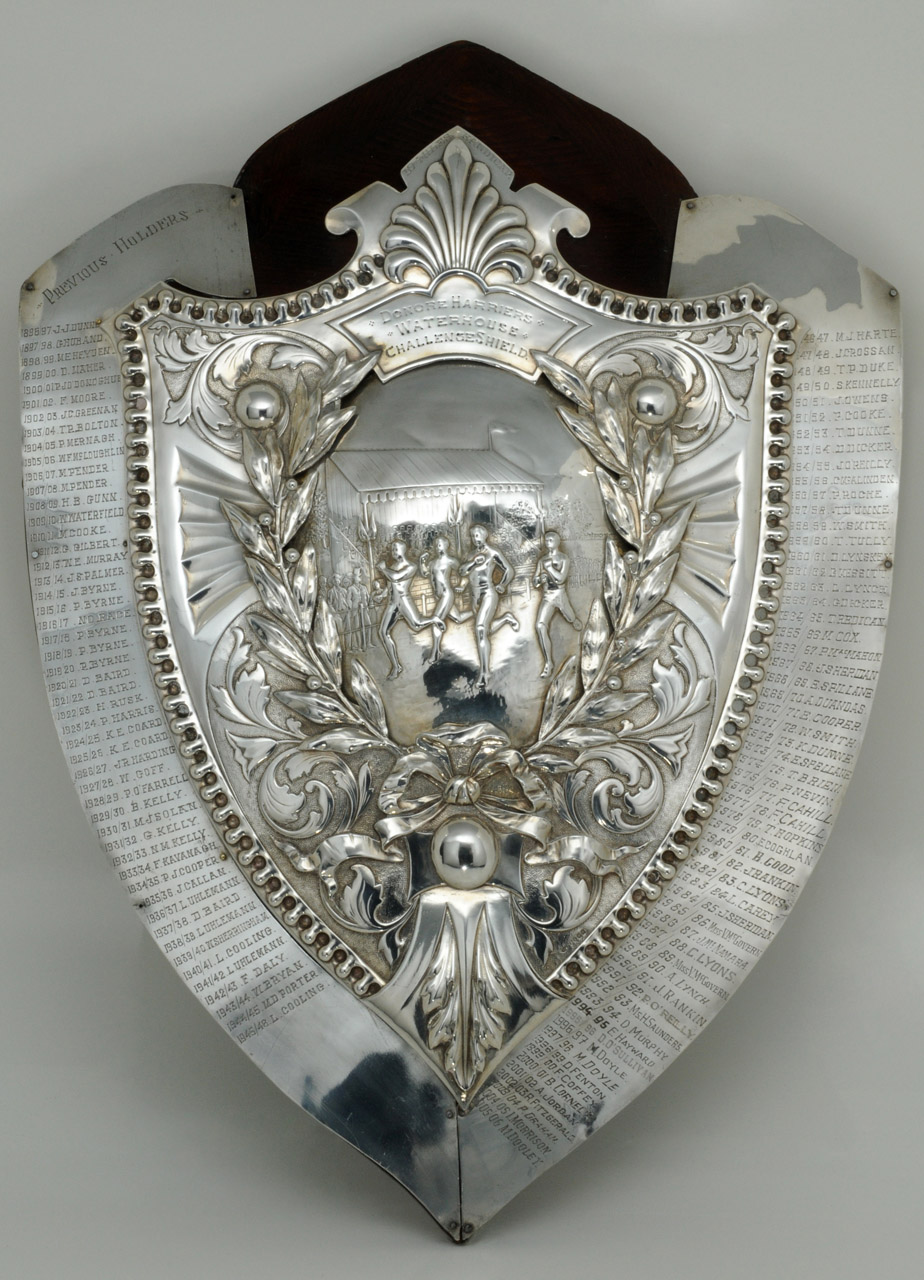
Waterhouse Byrne Baird Shield

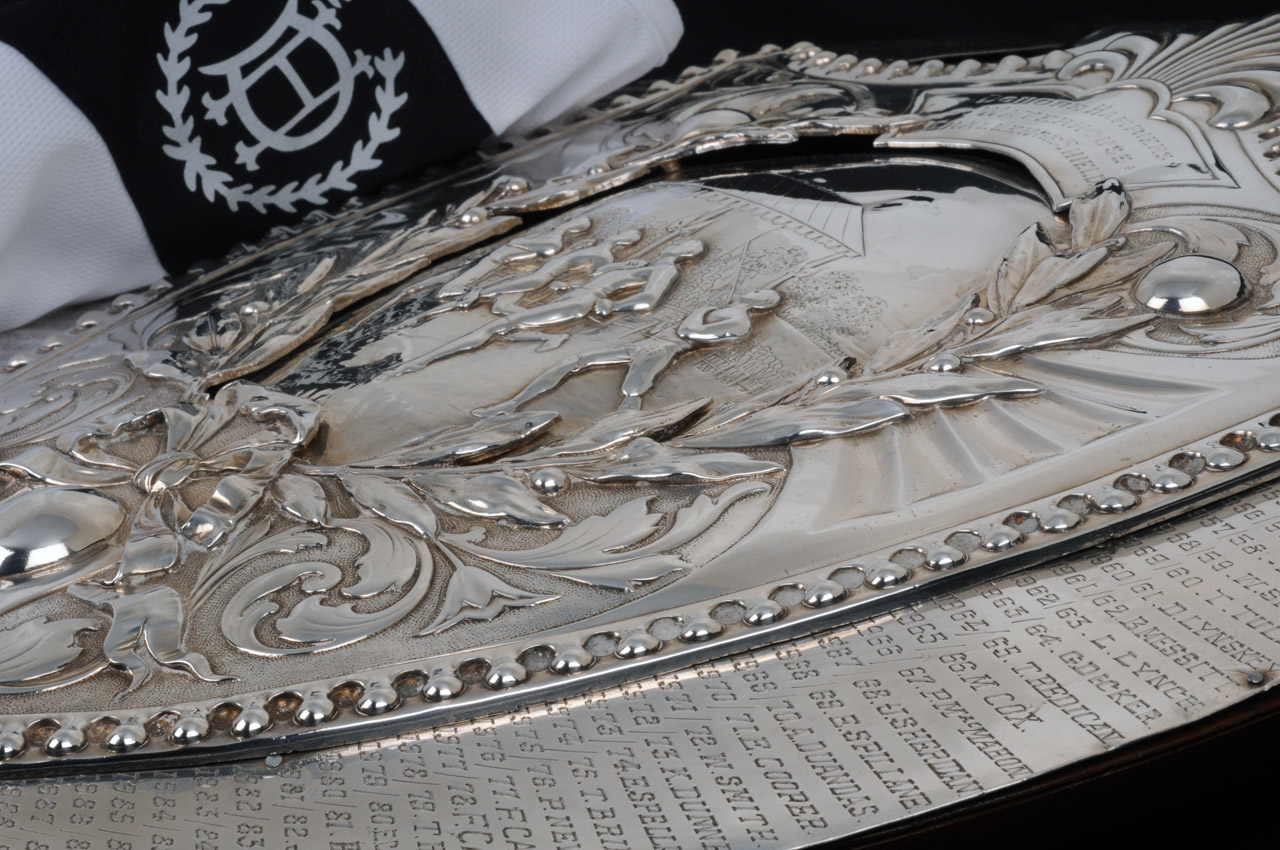
The Waterhouse Byrne Baird Shield trophy with Donore Harriers emblem in background

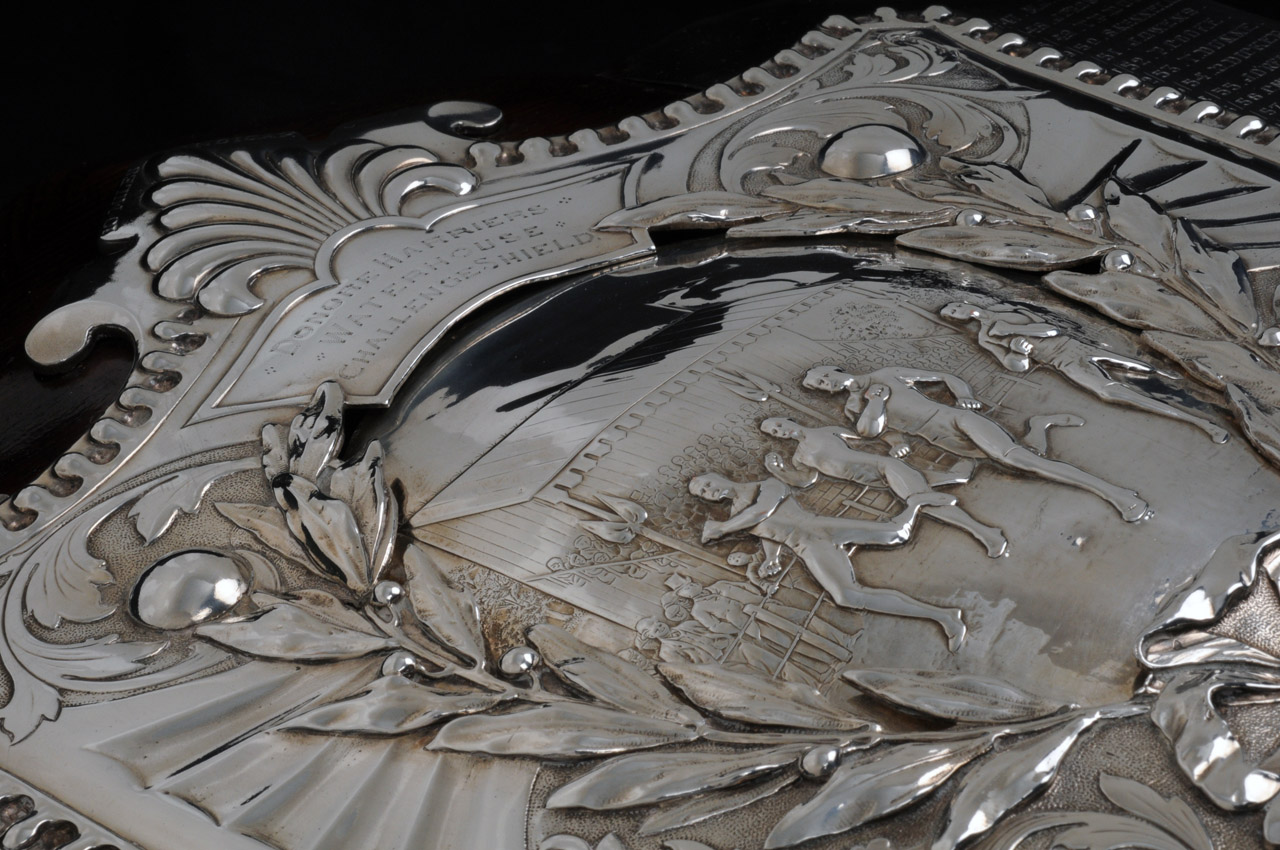
View of the shield detail

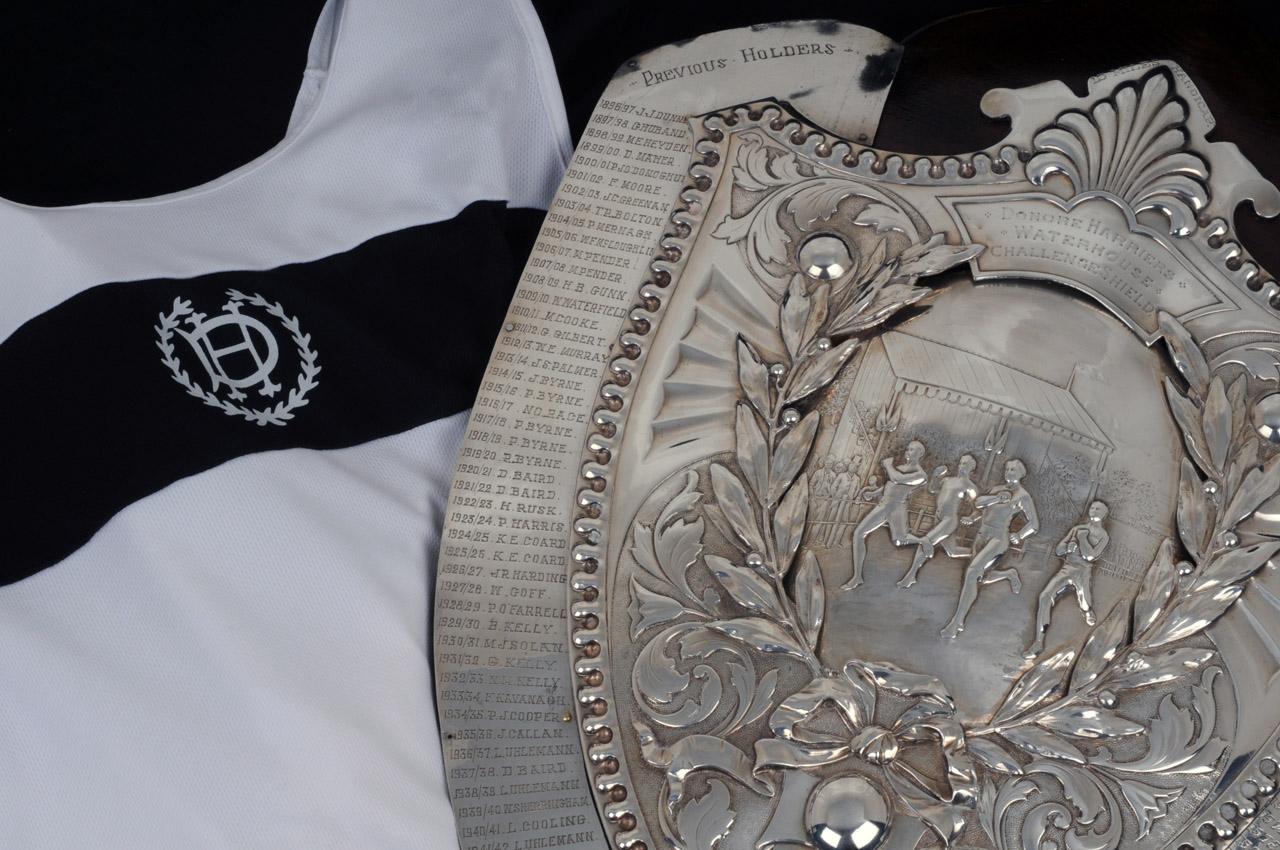
The Waterhouse Byrne Baird Shield & Donore Harriers Singlet

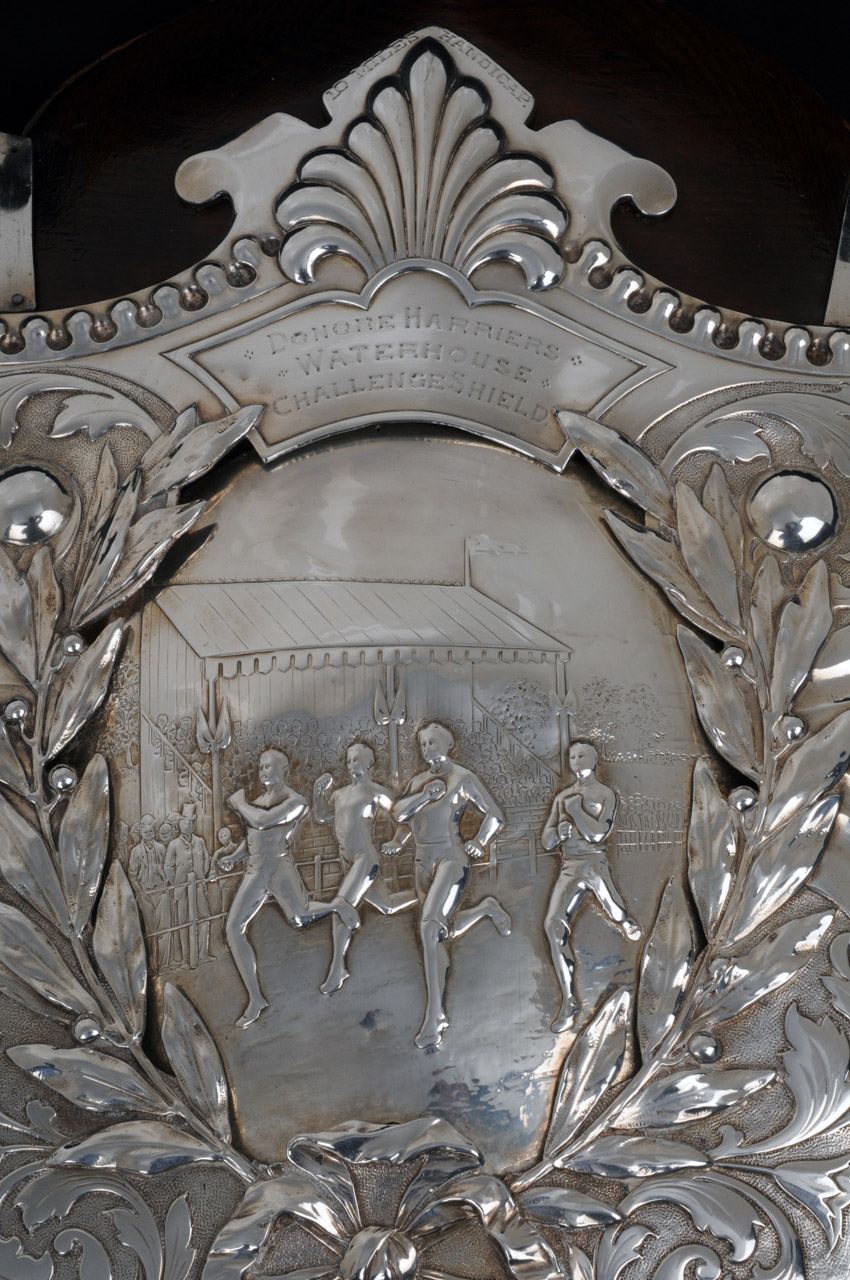
View of the centre detail of the Waterhouse Byrne Baird Shield

The Waterhouse Byrne Baird Shield is the oldest and longest consecutively run club cross-country event in Ireland, and one of the oldest in the world.

== History ==
It was first held in 1896, for members of the then-new Donore Harriers Club, when a Dublin jeweller by the name of Mr. Samuel Waterhouse, presented the Donore Harriers club with a silver shield for a 10-mile handicap cross-country race. The shield was known as the 'Donore Harriers Waterhouse Challenge Shield'.

This race, now known as the Waterhouse Byrne Baird Shield, has been competed for every year on St. Stephen's Day (26 December), with the exception of 1916. It was because so many Donore members were away in the trenches of World War I that the 1916 race wasn’t held. Another factor was the proximity of the course to the Magazine Fort, which was then an ammunitions depot and the scene of one of the first casualties the Easter Rising Rebellion earlier that year. However, the race was held during the most part of World War I, and continued on during the Spanish flu, the Irish Civil War, World War II, the Tuberculosis epidemic, outbreaks of Foot and Mouth disease, and the severe weather conditions of 1962 and 2010 in Ireland. During the Foot and Mouth outbreak in 1967, the race was held on the road. Athletes that year ran five laps of the 'Eagle Lap'. The quicker road times overall that year are not counted for shield race records. History will also show that the 2020 and 2021 versions of the race survived the COVID-19 pandemic. The race starts and finishes every year at the same tree beside the Dog Pond on the horse gallop in the Phoenix Park, Dublin.

The shield has to be won three times by the same person in order for the trophy to be claimed as the property of any one individual. In 1918, Paddy Byrne, after winning the trophy three times, re-presented the trophy to the club, and the same thing happened when Davie Baird, a man who had been seriously wounded at the Somme, similarly had three victories. But he managed to return to win in 1920, 1921, and again in 1937, to become immortalised in the event’s title as it currently stands.

Leo Uhlemann has also won the trophy three times overall, but two of those occasions occurred after Davie Baird added his name to the trophy; thereby resetting the clock for all other previous winners. They had to begin again from scratch in their quest to win it three times in order to get their names added to the ’shield title’.

The closest finish was in 1962, when Leo Lynch got to finish less than one yard ahead of the fast finishing scratch man Mick Neville. Earlier that year in January & February Neville became the only athlete ever to win all four individual Irish Cross Country Championships: AAU and IAAB Senior and Junior / Intermediate.

No winner, however, was to be more celebrated than Frank Cahill. Born in 1900, he made his race debut in 1923. There then followed perhaps the most heroic series of failures in the history of athletics, because for the next 52 years he competed without success. In 1974, he was only 200 yards from the finish line when victory was snatched from his grasp. In 1975 he missed a race for the first time, due to a training accident but he returned in 1976 to finally triumph. Legend has it that "scratch athlete" – Eamonn Coghlan – was still finishing breakfast at home in Ranelagh when Cahill started out on the first of his five, two-mile laps. Within sight of the finish, he fell over; and had he accepted the help offered by concerned onlookers, he might have been disqualified. Luckily, he managed to get to his feet again unaided, and make it to the finish line without being caught and on to glory. His heroics made the front page of The Irish Times, where Peter Byrne noted that Irish sport had just been deprived of its "most illustrious loser". As Byrne added, Cahill’s attempts to win had spanned the political careers of two Cosgraves, WT and Liam. But a year later, Liam Cosgrave was no longer taoiseach, and Cahill was still going strong. Proving that it’s never too late to start winning; Cahill retained the Shield in 1977: breaking his own record – which still stands – as the shield’s oldest winner at the age of 77! In contrast, the youngest winner of the Shield was Willie Smith in 1958, aged 15 years.

== Past winners ==
- 1896/97 J.J. Dunne
- 1897/98 G. Hubard
- 1898/99 M.E. Heyden
- 1899/1900 D. Maher → → (Held 24 March 1900)
- 1900/01 J. O’Donoghue
- 1901/02 F. Moore
- 1902/03 J.C. Greenan
- 1903/04 T.P. Bolton
- 1904/05 P. Mernagh
- 1905/06 W.F. McLoughlin
- 1906/07 M. Pender
- 1907/08 M. Pender
- 1908/09 H.B. Gunn
- 1909/10 W. Waterfield
- 1910/11 M. Cooke
- 1911/12 G. Gilbert
- 1912/13 W.E. Murray
- 1913/14 J.S. Palmer
- 1914/15 J. Byrne → → (Held 17 March 1915)
- 1915/16 Paddy Byrne
- 1916/17 No Race (due to World War I)
- 1917/18 Paddy Byrne
- 1918/19 Paddy Byrne (3rd Win)
- 1919/20 P. McNamara
- 1920/21 Davie Baird
- 1921/22 Davie Baird
- 1922/23 H. Rusk
- 1923/24 P. Harris
- 1924/25 Kenneth Coard
- 1925/26 Kenneth Coard → → (Held 17 April 1926)
- 1926/27 J.R. Harding
- 1927/28 W. Goff
- 1928/29 P. O'Farrell
- 1929/30 B. Kelly
- 1930/31 M.J. Solan
- 1931/32 G. Kelly → → (Held 17 March 1932)
- 1932/33 N.M. Kelly
- 1933/34 F. Kavanagh
- 1934/35 P.J. Cooper
- 1935/36 J. Callan
- 1936/37 Leo Uhlemann
- 1937/38 Davie Baird (3rd Win) → → (Held 17 March 1938)
- 1938/39 Leo Uhlemann → → (Held 17 March 1939)
- 1939/40 W. Sherringham
- 1940/41 L. Cooling → → (Held 17 March 1941)
- 1941/42 Leo Uhlemann
- 1942/43 F. Daly
- 1943/44 W. Bryan
- 1944/45 M.D. Porter
- 1945/46 L. Cooling
- 1946/47 M.J. Harte
- 1947/48 J. Crossan → → (Held 28 February 1948)
- 1948/49 T.P. Duke
- 1949/50 Seamus Kennelly
- 1950/51 J. Owens
- 1951/52 P. Cooke
- 1952/53 Tommy Dunne
- 1953/54 Dom Dicker
- 1954/55 Jim O'Reilly
- 1955/56 C. McAlinden
- 1956/57 P. Roche
- 1957/58 Joe Dunne
- 1958/59 Willie Smith (youngest winner – 15 years 39 days)
- 1959/60 T. Tully
- 1960/61 Dermot Lynskey
- 1961/62 Bertie Messitt
- 1962/63 Leo Lynch / 2nd - Mick Neville (closest finish – 1 yard)
- 1963/64 Godfrey Dicker / 2nd - Willie Dunne
- 1964/65 Tommy Redican
- 1965/66 Mick Cox
- 1966/67 Paul McMahon
- 1967/68 John Sheridan
- 1968/69 Eddie Spillane
- 1969/70 Andrew Dundas
- 1970/71 Eddie Cooper
- 1971/72 Willie Smith
- 1972/73 Kevin Dunne
- 1973/74 Eddie Spillane
- 1974/75 Tony Brien
- 1975/76 Paddy Nevin
- 1976/77 Frank Cahill
- 1977/78 Frank Cahill (oldest winner - 77 years 103 days)
- 1978/79 Tom Hopkins
- 1979/80 Eamonn Coghlan (the only sub 50 minute time)
- 1980/81 Ben Good
- 1981/82 Joe Rankin
- 1982/83 Conor Lyons
- 1983/84 Larry Carey
- 1984/85 John Sheridan
- 1985/86 Valerie McGovern (1st Lady Winner)
- 1986/87 Jim McNamara
- 1987/88 Conor Lyons
- 1988/89 Valerie McGovern
- 1989/90 Austin Lynch
- 1990/91 Joe Rankin
- 1991/92 Paddy O'Reilly
- 1992/93 Helen Saunders
- 1993/94 Derek Murphy
- 1994/95 Eric Hayward
- 1995/96 Donal O'Sullivan
- 1996/97 Mark Doyle
- 1997/98 Mark Doyle
- 1998/99 David Fenton
- 1999/2000 Frank Coffey / 2nd - Willie Smith / 3rd - Noel Iremonger
- 2000/01: Brian Cornelia / 2nd - Andrea Fleming / 3rd - Anne Curley
- 2001/02: Adrienne Jordan / 2nd - Anne Curley / 3rd - Jim Clarke
- 2002/03: Richard Fitzgerald / 2nd - Donal Iremonger / 3rd - Tom Hickey
- 2003/04: Paul Graham / 2nd - Aidan McGrath / 3rd - Phillip Cavanagh
- 2004/05: Iain Morrison / 2nd – Andrew Rogers / 3rd – Paul Graham
- 2005/06: Mark Dooley / 2nd – Ciarán O'Flaherty / 3rd – Barry Potts
- 2006/07: Susan Walsh / 2nd – Anne Curley / 3rd – Keith Daly
- 2007/08: John Breen / 2nd – Colin Moore / 3rd – Ken Nugent
- 2008/09: Simon Meyler / 2nd – Eileen Walsh / 3rd – Fred Kiernan
- 2009/10: Fred Kiernan / 2nd – Andy Hanrahan / 3rd – Cindy Hickey
- 2010/11: Colin Moore / 2nd – Tom Hickey / 3rd – Fergal Swaine
- 2011/12: Arthur Connick / 2nd – Jonathan Daly / 3rd – Ken Nugent
- 2012/13: Michelle Dawson / 2nd – Angela Eustace / 3rd – Terry Mee
- 2013/14: Paul Cummins / 2nd – Barry Potts / 3rd – Angela Eustace
- 2014/15: Ian Redican / 2nd – John Dunne / 3rd – Jim McNamara
- 2015/16: Alan Farrell / 2nd – Tom Fagan / 3rd – George Brady
- 2016/17: Tony Griffin / 2nd - Ian Redican / 3rd - Niall Lynch
- 2017/18: Niamh O'Neill / 2nd - Barry Potts / 3rd - Desmond Gill
- 2018/19: Anne Curley / 2nd - David Campbell / 3rd - Gavin Keogh
- 2019/20: Luke Boland / 2nd - Julia Hackett / 3rd - Gavin Keogh
- 2020/21: James Bolton / 2nd - Donal Iremonger / 3rd - Craig Scott
- 2021/22: Ken Nugent / 2nd - Rossa Hurley / 3rd - Claire Mulligan
- 2022/23: Deirdre Nic Canna / 2nd - Emmet Ó Briain / 3rd - Danny O’Sullivan
- 2023/24: Angela Eustace / 2nd - Patrick Byrne / 3rd - Ryan Atkins
- 2024/25: Neil Hand / 2nd - Claire Mulligan / 3rd - Roisin Brady
- 2025/26: Kishor Shelake

== Shield Trivia ==
- Youngest Winner - Willie Smith, 1958 (aged 15 years 39 days)
- Oldest Winner - Frank Cahill, 1977 (aged 77 years 103 days)
- 1st Male Winner - J.J. Dunne, 1896
- 1st Female Winner - Valerie McGovern, 1988
- Fastest Male Time - Eamonn Coghlan, 1979 (49:56 - the only sub 50 minute time)
- Fastest Female Time - Barbera Cleary, 2021 (62:10)
- 1st Two-time Winner - M. Pender, 1907
- 1st Three-time Winner - Paddy Byrne, 1918 (his name was added to the shield, then becoming known as the Waterhouse Byrne Shield)
- 1st Back to Back Winner - M. Pender, 1906 & 1907
- 1st Double Sibling Winners - Tommy Dunne, 1952 / Joe Dunne, 1957
- 1st Triple Sibling Winners - Tommy Dunne, 1952 / Joe Dunne, 1957 / Kevin Dunne, 1972
- 1st Father & Son Winners - Tommy Redican, 1964 / Ian Redican, 2014 (50 years to the day)
- 1st Sibling Winner & Runner-up - 1924 - Kenneth Coard (Race Winner) / Douglas Coard (2nd in race)
- Closest Finish - 1962 when Leo Lynch (Handicap of 21 minutes) held on by 'one yard' ahead of 'scratch man' Mick Neville.

== Fastest Times Leaderboard ==
- 49:56 - Eamonn Coghlan, 1979 (Winner - running off scratch)
- 50:31 - Eamonn Coghlan, 1977 (4th in race)
- 50:50 - Tom O'Riordan, 1966 (7th in race - running off scratch)
- 51:00 - Bertie Messitt, 1961 (Winner - running off scratch)
- 51:09 - Mick Neville, 1962 (2nd in race)
- 51:10 - Tony Brien, 1978 (4th in race)
- 51:28 - Eamonn Coghlan, 1975 (5th in race)
- 51:39 - Tom O'Riordan, 1971 (2nd in race)
- 51:53 - Tony Brien, 1974 (Winner - running off scratch)
- 52:30 - Eamonn Coghlan, 1978 (7th in race)
- 52:42 - John Sheridan, 1976 (6th in race)
- 52:56 - Donal O'Sullivan, 1995
- 52:58 - Tony Murphy, 1964 (4th in race)
- 53:07 - Tommy Redican, 1971 (5th in race)
- 53:08 - Eddie Spillane, 1964 (2nd in race)
- 53:18 - Tom O'Riordan, 1976 (7th in race)
- 53:35 - Eddie Spillane, 1971 (6th in race)
- 53:54 - Willie Dunne, 1971 (8th in race - running off scratch)
- 53:56 - Jim McNamara, 1976 (8th in race)
- 54:15 - Willie Dunne, 1964 (8th in race)
- 54:28 - Jim McNamara, 1964 (7th in race)
- 54:33 - John Travers, 2015 (5th in race)
- 54:46 - B. Dunne, 1964 (9th in race)

== Evolution of the Shield Name ==
(3 wins are required for a name to be added to the Shield)

=== 1896-1918: The Donore Harriers Waterhouse Challenge Shield ===
Two-time Winner

- M. Pender (1906 & 1907)

Three-time Winner

- Paddy Byrne (1915, 1917 & 1918)

Paddy Byrne, after winning the trophy three times, re-presented the shield to the club and it henceforth became known as 'The Waterhouse Byrne Shield'

=== 1919-1938: The Waterhouse Byrne Shield ===
Two-time Winner

- Kenneth Coard (1924 & 1925)

Three-time Winner

- Davie Baird (1920, 1921 & 1937)

Davie Baird, after winning the trophy three times, re-presented the shield to the club and it henceforth became known as 'The Waterhouse Byrne Baird Shield'

=== Since 1938: The Waterhouse Byrne Baird Shield ===
Two-time Winners

- Leo Uhlemann (1938 & 1941)
- L. Cooling (1940 & 1945)
- Willie Smith (1958 & 1971)
- John Sheridan (1967 & 1984)
- Eddie Spillane (1968 & 1973)
- Frank Cahill (1976 & 1977)
- Joe Rankin (1981 & 1990)
- C. Lyons (1982 & 1987)
- M. Doyle (1996 & 1997)

== Other Donore Harrier Trophies ==
=== The Faugh-a-Ballagh Challenge Cup ===
The Faugh-a-Ballagh Cup is contested by club runners from the men's section of Donore Harriers annually over 6 Miles traditionally in the Phoenix Park, Dublin. It is the Donore Harriers Club Cross Country Championships Cup. Since 2017, Donore women compete on the same day for the Jim McNamara Cup.

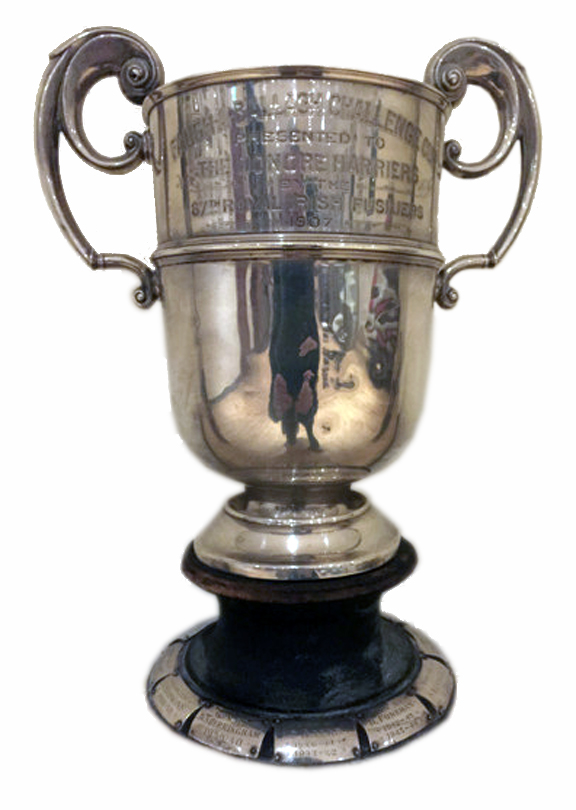
Faugh-a-Ballagh Cup

The course traditionally takes in the horse gallop trail, which runs adjacent to Chesterfield Avenue in the Phoenix Park. It turns close to the stone wall, which is in the clearing at the end of the gallop & with the Pope's Cross in view. It turns back entering the inside part of the tress at the top of the Kyber before emerging through the open ground with its numerous dips, heading in the direction of the Civil Service Pavilion; where loops around again to the Horse Gallop.

The Faugh-a-Ballagh Cup which was first awarded in 1907 to the senior men's winner, is one of the oldest trophies in Donore Harriers; and club trophies in Ireland. It was presented by the 87th Royal Irish Fusiliers in 1907 as a perpetual trophy for the men's club cross country championship over 6 miles.

The first running of the cup took place in Meadowbrook, Dundrum. A report from the time stated that there was "a big gathering of spectators, including many old associates of the club foregathered to witness what turned out to be a very interesting event..." It goes on to give at length to give details of the race, including that, '"V.P. McDonagh, Hon. Secretary sent the 13 competitors on their journey to a capital start"

Previous winners of the cup include well known Irish International and Donore Harriers Athletes: Bertie Messitt, Tom O’Riordan and Jim McNamara.

L.Kelly was the first winner of the cup. Since then there have been three '4 time' winners of the cup:

- Paddy Byrne 'the Byrne from the Waterhouse Byrne Baird Shield' - 1916/1917/1919/1920
- Kevin Maguire - 1948/1949/1950/1951
- Eddie Spillane - 1970/1971/1973/1974

However, the most prolific winner was Bertie Messitt with six wins in 1953, 1958, 1959, 1960, 1961 and 1964.

Other notable winners of the cup were :

- Tom O'Riordan (3) - 1967/1968/1969 (Olympian - 1964, Tokyo / 9 times Irish Cross Country International)
- Jim McNamara (2) - 1965/1966 (Olympian - 1976, Montreal)
- Tony Brien (3) - 1975/1978/1979 (4 time Irish Cross Country International)

Other Donore Harriers Internationals to win the Cup were:

- Tommy Dunne (2)
- Mick Neville (2)
- Jack Dougan (2)
- Tony Murphy
- John Phelan

==== Faugh-a-Ballagh Cup Previous Winners ====
- 1907 - L. Byrne
- 1908 -
- 1909 -
- 1910 -
- 1911 -
- 1912 -
- 1913 -
- 1914 -
- 1915 -
- 1916 - Paddy Byrne
- 1917 - Paddy Byrne
- 1919 - Paddy Byrne
- 1920 - Paddy Byrne
- 1921 -
- 1922 -
- 1923 -
- 1924 -
- 1925 - Douglas Coard
- 1926 - Ken Coard
- 1927 -
- 1928 - Douglas Coard
- 1929 -
- 1930 -
- 1931 -
- 1932 -
- 1933 -
- 1934 -
- 1935 -
- 1936 - T. Hopkins
- 1937 -
- 1938 - J. Callan
- 1939 - T. Hopkins
- 1940 - W. Sherringham
- 1941 - S. Banks
- 1942 - S. Banks
- 1943 - B. Foreman
- 1944 - B. Foreman
- 1945 -
- 1946 -
- 1947 - Pat Haughey
- 1948 - Kevin Maguire
- 1949 - Kevin Maguire
- 1950 - Kevin Maguire
- 1951 - Kevin Maguire
- 1952 - S. Kennelly
- 1953 - Bertie Messit
- 1954 - Jack Dougan
- 1955 - Jack Dougan
- 1956 - Tommy Dunne
- 1957 -
- 1958 - Bertie Messit
- 1959 - Bertie Messit
- 1959 - Bertie Messit
- 1960 - Bertie Messit
- 1961 - Bertie Messit
- 1962 - Mick Neville
- 1963 - Mick Neville (29:27) / 2nd: M. Connolly (29:55) / 3rd: B. Dunne (30:30)
- 1964 - Bertie Messit
- 1965 - Jim McNamara
- 1966 - Jim McNamara (33:30) / 2nd: T. Hopkins (35:10) / 3rd: W. Dunne (35:33)
- 1967 - Tom O'Riordan
- 1968 - Tom O'Riordan
- 1969 - Tom O'Riordan (31:03) / 2nd: J. Sheridan (31:33) / 3rd: T. Redican (32:44)
- 1970 - Eddie Spillane (31:07) / 2nd: J. McNamara (31:10) / 3rd: T. Redican (31:31)
- 1971 - Eddie Spillane (31:07) / 2nd: T. Redican (31:08) / 3rd: J. McNamara (31:32),
- 1972 -
- 1973 - Eddie Spillane
- 1974 - Eddie Spillane
- 1975 - Tony Brien
- 1976 -
- 1977 -
- 1978 - Tony Brien
- 1979 - Tony Brien
- 1980 -
- 1981 -
- 1982 -
- 1983 -
- 1984 -
- 1985 -
- 1986 -
- 1987 -
- 1988 - C. Lyons
- 1989 -
- 1990 -
- 1991 -
- 1992 -
- 1993 -
- 1994 -
- 1995 -
- 1996 - C. Lyons
- 1997 - C. Lyons
- 1998 -
- 1999 -
- 2000 -
- 2001 -
- 2002 -
- 2003 -
- 2004 -
- 2005 -
- 2006 -
- 2007 - George Brady
- 2008 -
- 2009 -
- 2010 -
- 2011 -
- 2012 -
- 2013 -
- 2014 -
- 2015 -
- 2016 -
- 2017 - Fergal Swaine
- 2018 - Alan Farrell
- 2019 - Des Tremble
- 2020 - Josh O’Sullivan-Hourihan

==== Jim McNamara Cup Previous Winners ====
- 2017 - Barbera Cleary
- 2018 - Maura Kearns
- 2019 - Barbera Cleary
- 2020 - Grace Kennedy-Clarke

==== Faugh-a-Ballagh and the Donore Connection with the Royal Dublin Fusiliers ====
The club along with many members of Donore Harriers has a strong connection with the Royal Dublin Fusiliers. Davie Baird joined the 10th Battalion of the Royal Dublin Fusiliers and was badly wounded at the Battle of Ancre in 1916. He made a full recovery and went on to win, most famously the Waterhouse Byrne Shield over three occasions to add his name to that trophy.

There is also an amazing connection and coincidence between 6-time winner of the cup Bertie Messitt and the Fusiliers and the Faugh-a-Ballagh Cup. Years before he joined Donore Harriers, due to lack of work he joined the British Army in 1946, aged 18. His regiment, the Royal Irish Fusiliers were known worldwide as the 'Faughs'. Bertie wrote poetry, and he wrote this short poem about his time in the Regiment:

FAUGH-A-BALLAGH

I wore a hackle in my hat,

and marched behind a band.

Carried a Lee Enfield rifle,

and served in foreign lands.

They were the best days of my life,

I cherish those golden years.

When I was a proud member of

the Irish Fusiliers.

=== Strahan-Cahill Cup ===
The Strahan Cahill Cup is a Donore Harriers Club Cross-Country Handicap race run over 6 Miles traditionally in the Phoenix Park alongside the Faugh-a-Ballagh Cup.

== External sources ==
- www.donoreharriers.com
- Maurice Ahern, Sunday Miscellany on RTÉ Radio on Sunday 22 December 2013
- Frank Greally, – 5 December 2013, https://www.independent.ie (Lifestyle/Health Section)
- Phoenix Park Events (December 2014) http://www.phoenixpark.ie/media/Events%202014.pdf
