= Children's Health Ireland at Crumlin =

Ireland's largest paediatric hospital

- Health Service Executive
- Shown in Dublin

Geography
- Location: Dublin, Ireland
- Coordinates: 53°19′33″N 6°19′02″W

Organisation
- Care system: HSE
- Type: Specialist

Services
- Speciality: Paediatrics

History
- Founded: 1956

Children's Health Ireland at Crumlin (CHI at Crumlin; Irish: Sláinte Leanaí Éireann ag Cromghlinn) in Dublin is Ireland's largest paediatric hospital.

== Location and access ==
Despite its name, the hospital is technically in the Drimnagh area of Dublin. It is around 5 kilometres (3 mi) south-west of the city centre, where Crumlin Road meets Drimnagh Road. The main entrance is in Cooley Road. There are many bus routes nearby. Drimnagh Luas stop is 1 km to the north (1.3 km by foot).

== History ==
The hospital, which was built on land donated by the Archbishop of Dublin, was designed by Robinson Keefe Devane and officially opened as Our Lady's Hospital for Sick Children in 1956.

The hospital changed its name to "Our Lady's Children's Hospital, Crumlin" in 2005.

In November 2012 the Minister for Health James Reilly announced plans to transfer the hospital's services to a new children's hospital on the campus of St. James's Hospital.

In July 2013 concerns were raised about children who underwent a colonoscopy at the hospital between 17 May and 5 July 2013; it was revealed they had been exposed to an infection that could not be cured by antibiotics.

The hospital changed its name from Our Lady's Children's Hospital, Crumlin to Children's Health Ireland at Crumlin as part of the rebranding of three hospitals under the Children's Health Ireland banner on 1 January 2019.

As of late October 2020, the hospital had failed to make several of its clinical trial results public as required by European Union transparency rules.

== All-Ireland champions ==
It is a tradition that All-Ireland champions visit the hospital after the final. When the Dublin senior ladies' football team won the 2019 All-Ireland Senior Ladies' Football Championship final, the team included Rachel Ruddy who works as a physiotherapist at the hospital. Ruddy hosted her Dublin teammates during their visit.
