= Tommy Redican =

Irish athlete

Personal information
- Nationality: Irish
- Born: Thomas Redican; 4 August 1942 Dublin, Ireland
- Died: 25 January 2013 (aged 70) Dublin, Ireland

Sport
- Sport: Long-distance running
- Event: 1 Mile to Marathon
- Club: Donore Harriers

Tommy Redican was an Irish athlete from Donore Harriers. In 1964 he won the Waterhouse Byrne Baird Shield. He is a first cousin of Donore Harriers and Olympian Jim McNamara. He was a member of the great Donore Harrier's teams, coached by the legendary Eddie Hogan, which dominated Irish athletics during the 1960s and 1970s bringing success in cross-country and distance running unequalled in its achievements to this day. The teams included many of the greatest names in Irish distance running... the Dunne brothers: Tommy Dunne (5th in the World Cross Country), Olympian Willie Dunne, Olympian Bertie Messitt, Olympian Tom O'Riordan, Olympian & 11 time World Cross-Country competitor Jim McNamara, Olympian & Sub 4 minute miler Basil Clifford, Olympian, Pat Cassidy, John Phelan, Tony Brien, Mick Neville, Tony Murphy, Mick Connolly, Brendan O'Shea, Mick Flood, Frank Greally, Eddie Spillane and John Sheridan. He was a member of the Donore team which represented Ireland in the European Clubs Championships in 1969, that finished 2nd and just 9 points behind the winners A.C. Dortmstadt in Arlon, Belgium. In 1972 he represented Ireland at the IAAF International Cross Country Championships in Parliament Hill Fields, London, England. On 17 March 1973 he was part of the Donore Team that represented Ireland at the IAAF International Cross Country Championships in Ghent, Belgium.
