= Fatima Mansions =

Fatima Mansions may refer to:

- Fatima Mansions (housing), a public housing estate in Dublin, Ireland
- The Fatima Mansions, a musical group named after the housing project
