= Rialto Luas stop =

Tram stop in Dublin, Ireland

Rialto Rialto
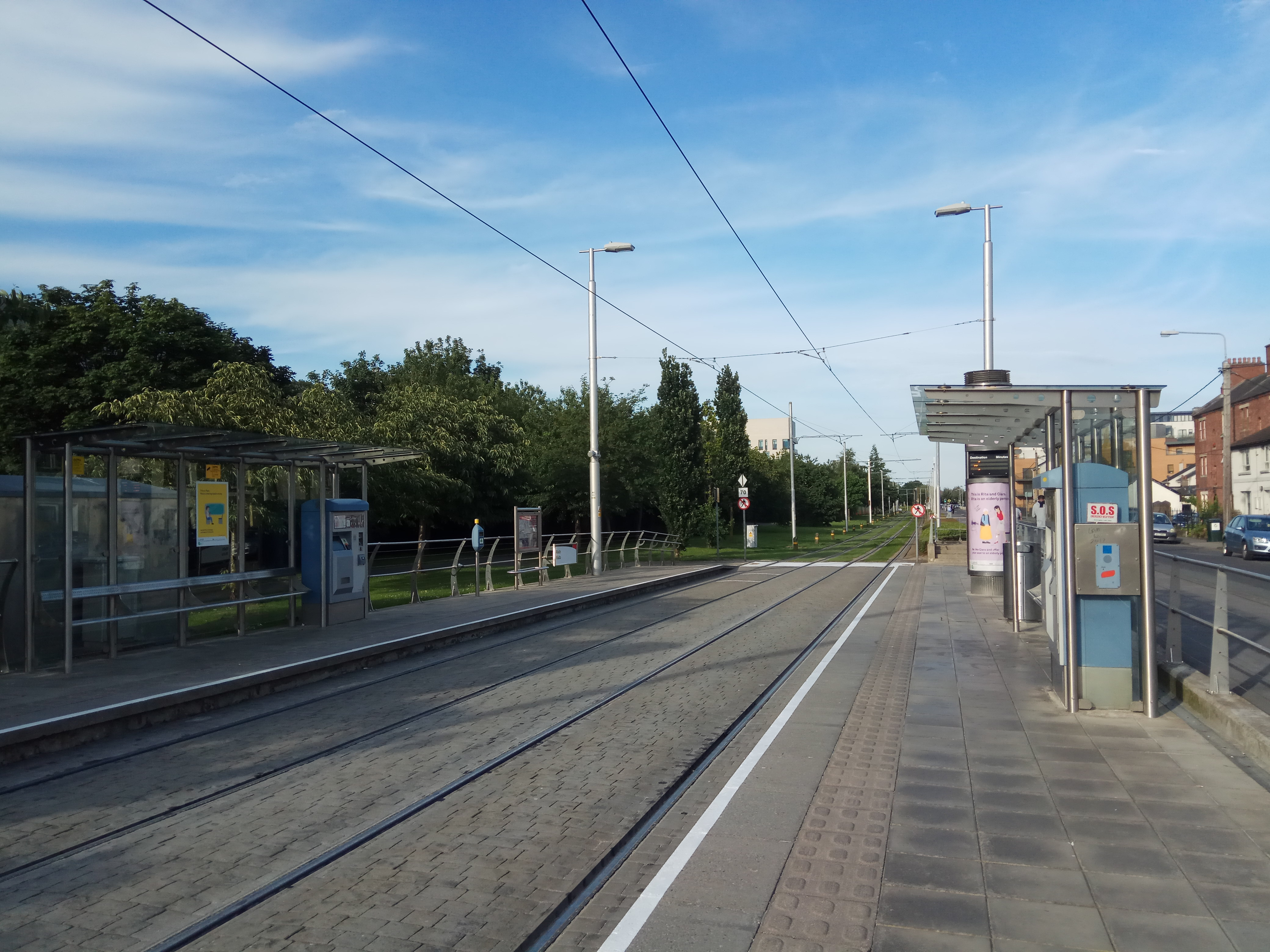
- The platforms at Rialto

General information
- Location: Dublin; Ireland
- Coordinates: 53°20′16″N 6°17′50″W
- Owner: Transport Infrastructure Ireland
- Operator: Luas
- Line: Red
- Platforms: 2
- Bus routes: 4
- Bus operators: Dublin Bus
- Connections: 68; 68A; 123; S2

Construction
- Structure type: At-grade

Other information
- Fare zone: Red 2

Key dates
- 26 September 2004: Station opened

Services
Preceding station	Luas	Following station
Suir Road towards Saggart or Tallaght	Red Line	Fatima towards The Point or Connolly
Proposed
Suir Road towards Newcastle Road	Line F	Fatima towards Trinity
Location
- Location within Central Dublin

Rialto is a stop on the Luas light-rail tram system in Dublin, Ireland. It opened in 2004 as a stop on the Red Line. The stop is at the southern side of St. James's Hospital, adjacent to James's Walk, near the areas of Rialto and Kilmainham.

At this point, the Red Line follows an old canal alignment: The Grand Canal was opened in 1779, running from James's Street near Dublin city centre, through Sallins and further west. In 1796, a branch of the canal was added which took a circular route around the city centre from Suir Road to the current Grand Canal Dock in Ringsend. The original mainline later closed and its alignment lay empty for many years until it was selected as part of the route for the Luas line.

The stop is also served by Dublin Bus routes 68, 68a, and S2.

Fatima is intended to be a stop on the proposed Luas line to Lucan.

== Rialto Bridge ==
A short distance down the line from the stop is Harcourt Bridge, which carries the South Circular Road over the tram line (and previously the canal). The original bridge was built in 1795 and named after the chairman of the Grand Canal Company, Simon Harcourt, 1st Earl Harcourt. However, it soon developed the nickname Rialto Bridge due to its similarity to the bridge with that name in Venice (which also spans a Grand Canal). This is believed to be what gives the suburb its name.

The current bridge bears little resemblance to the Venetian bridge, and it has been suggested that it was built in the early 20th century. The bridge was further remodeled during the construction of the Luas line in order to comply with safety requirements; the stone railings at the side were replaced with solid concrete blocks which continue the pattern of lines carved into the rest of the bridge.

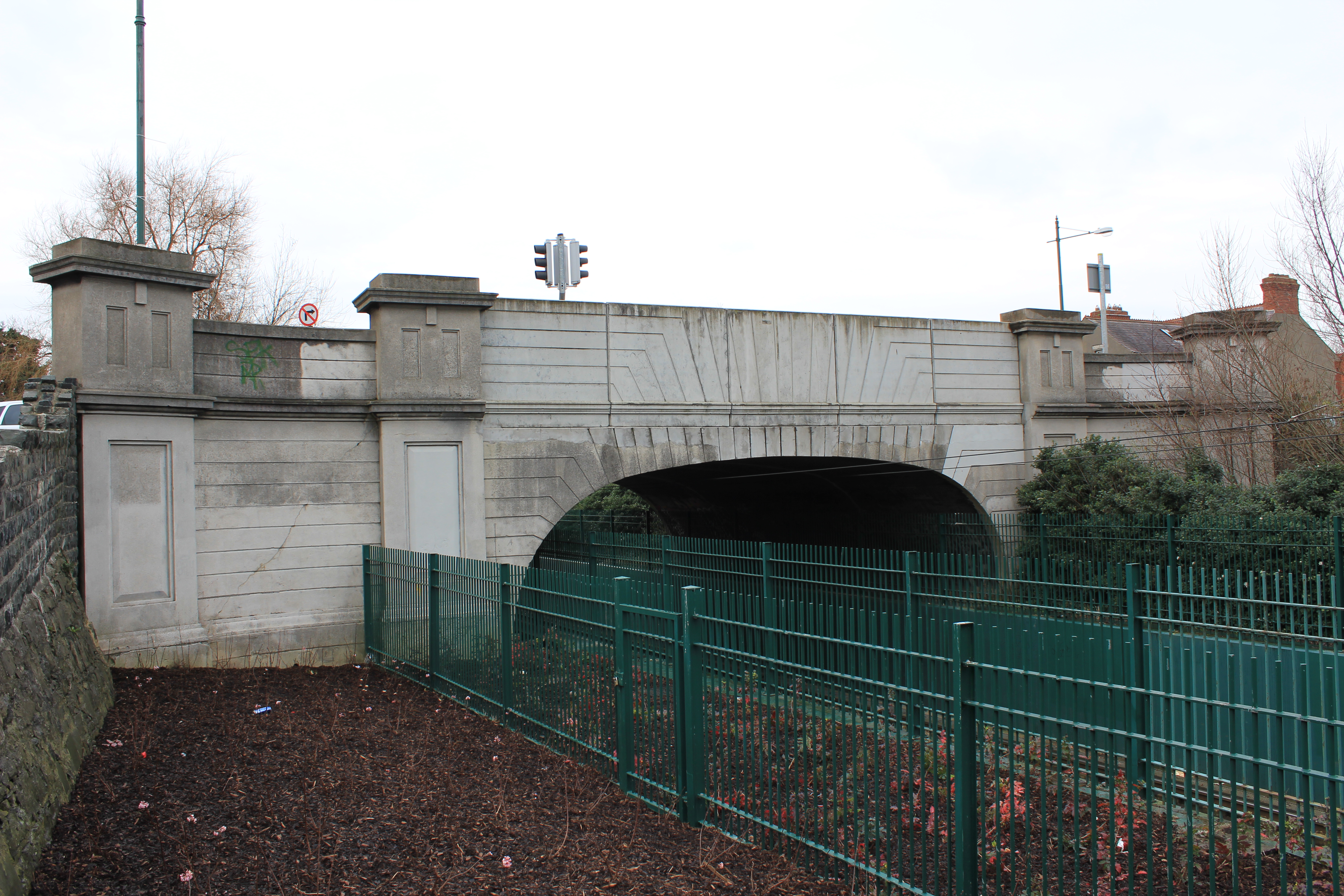
Rialto Bridge, Dublin
