= Fatima Luas stop =

Tram stop in Dublin, Ireland

Fatima
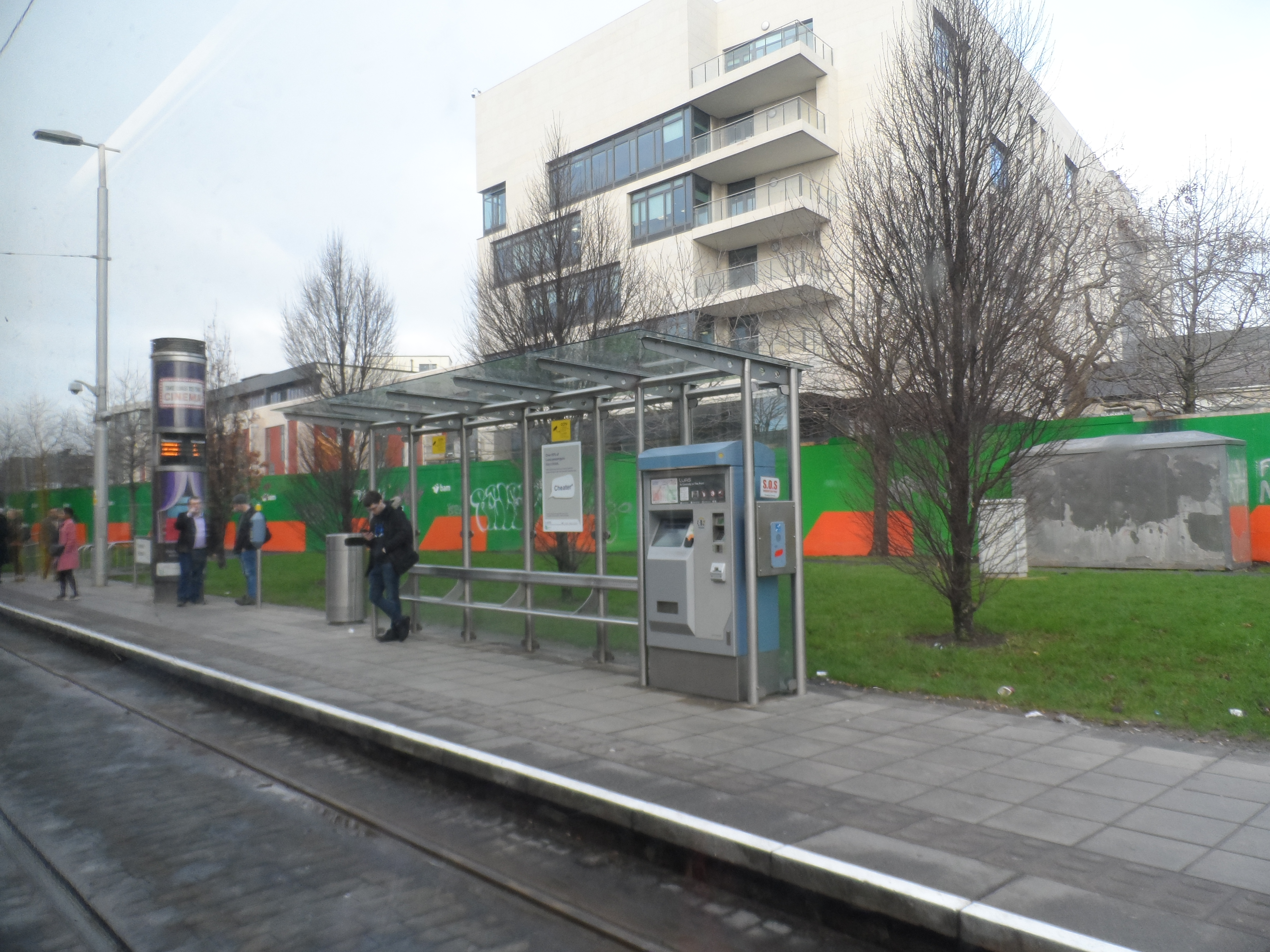
- A platform at Fatima

General information
- Location: Dublin; Ireland
- Coordinates: 53°20′18″N 6°17′33″W
- Owner: Transport Infrastructure Ireland
- Operator: Transdev (as Luas)
- Line: Red
- Platforms: 2

Construction
- Structure type: At-grade

Other information
- Fare zone: Red 2

Key dates
- 26 September 2004: Station opened

Services
Preceding station	Luas	Following station
Rialto towards Saggart or Tallaght	Red Line	James's towards The Point or Connolly
Proposed
Rialto towards Newcastle Road	Line F	Meath Street towards Trinity
Location
- Location within Central Dublin

Fatima is a stop on the Luas light-rail tram system in Dublin, Ireland. It opened in 2004 as a stop on the Red Line. The stop is at the southern side of St. James's Hospital, adjacent to James's Walk. Fatima is named for its proximity to Fatima Mansions, a public housing complex. It provides access to the suburbs of Dolphin's Barn, The Coombe, and The Liberties. The stop has two edge platforms, and is of the same design as many Luas stops. After departing the stop, northbound trams turn left and traverse the grounds of the hospital on their way to Connolly or The Point. Southbound trams continue along an abandoned canal alignment, travelling towards Tallaght or Saggart.

== Proposals ==
In 2007, a proposal was announced for a Luas line from the city centre to Lucan. As of 2020, the project had not been officially approved, but under the proposal, the new line would share track with the Red Line between Fatima and Blackhorse. Fatima would therefore become a junction stop, with trams en route from Lucan to the city centre travelling due east along James's Walk.

== Incidents ==
On 8 July 2017, a woman died after being struck by a city centre-bound Luas tram at St. James Walk, just past the Fatima stop, in Rialto.
