= Rialto, Dublin =

Inner suburb of Dublin, Ireland

Rialto Rialto (Irish)
- Inner suburb
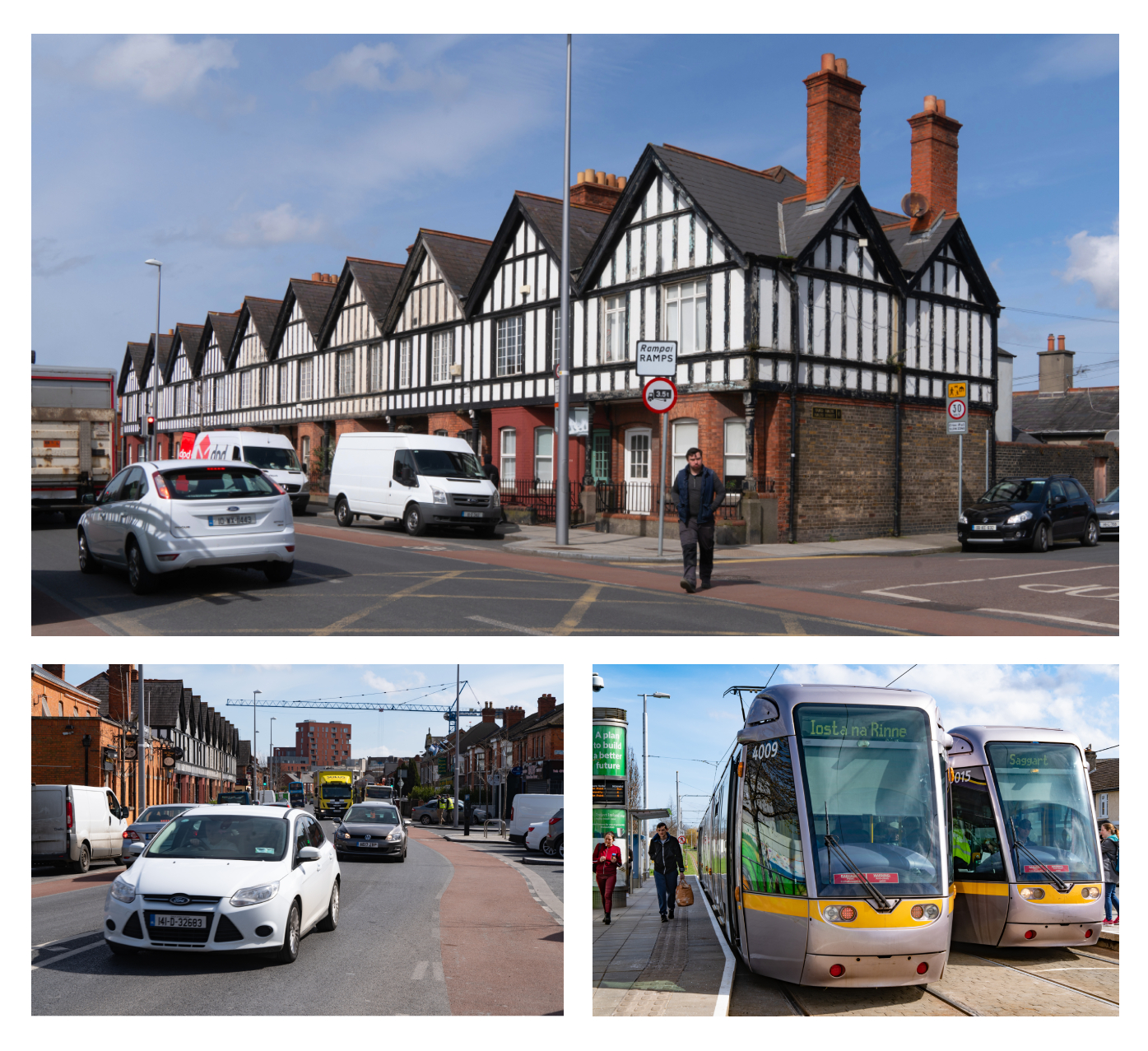
- Clockwise from top: Tudor Revival terraced houses in Rialto; Rialto's Luas tram station; looking southeast from Rialto

- Location in Ireland
- Coordinates: 53.336°N 6.297°W
- Country: Ireland
- Province: Leinster
- County: County Dublin
- Local authority: Dublin City Council
- Dáil Éireann: Dublin South-Central
- European Parliament: Dublin
- Elevation: 20 m (66 ft)
- Eircode routing key: D08
- Area code: 01 (+3531)

Rialto (Irish: Rialto) is an inner suburb of Dublin, situated on the city's southside. The area takes its name from the Harcourt Bridge, which was commonly known as the Rialto Bridge due to its resemblance to the shape of the bridge of that name in Venice.

== History and geography ==
Rialto is bounded to the east and north by The Liberties, St. James's Hospital and an original section of the Grand Canal stretching from Suir Bridge to James Street Basin, which was built for freight transport to and from the nearby Guinness brewery at St. James's Gate. This original section of the Grand Canal, disused since 1976, preceded an extension of the canal to Grand Canal Dock which today defines the district's southern and eastern edges. St James's Walk overlooks this former spur of the canal, which led to the city basin.

Rialto Bridge spans the original and disused portion of the Grand Canal which now forms part of the Luas Red Line.

== Transport ==
Rialto is located within Dublin's canal ring and at the western end of Dublin's South Circular Road, placing the area within walking distance of Dublin city centre and one of Ireland's main railway stations at Dublin Heuston.

The original portion of the Grand Canal running along the northern edge of Rialto and Fatima has in recent decades been repurposed as the Luas Red Line route connecting Dublin's Docklands at The Point and the city's southwestern suburbs at Tallaght. Rialto Luas stop is located a short distance from the Rialto Bridge and serves Rialto as well as the neighbouring district of Kilmainham and the site of the new National Children's Hospital.

The area is served by multiple Dublin Bus routes connecting with Dublin city centre and destinations such as University College Dublin and Blackrock in Dún Laoghaire–Rathdown and Greenogue in South Dublin.

== St James's Walk/Colbert Fort housing scheme ==
St James Walk/Colbert Fort is a small triangular area in Rialto with surrounding features including the Grand Canal and the River Poddle.

In the year 1915, there were two expressions of interest in this site. There were no objections to building on the site, which the Corporation did already own, and it was agreed that the housing would be extremely useful.

After 1916, the site was auctioned off and the winning bid was from Mr Alexander Hull. Building was due to be completed in just nine months. Unfortunately due to many different problems such as the plan to widen the road, lack of men and materials and on top of that a strike run by the craftsmen the project was not complete in the time frame given. After many setbacks, the housing was handed over to the corporation on 21 March 1921. The naming of the streets was carried out with the intention of showing respect towards those who had fought during the 1916 rebellion. St James's Walk then became Colbert's Fort; the streets commemorated Mallin, Clarke and MacCarthy. Many of the houses on Colbert's Fort are still standing today and add some intrigue to the area.

== Famous residents ==
- Des Bishop, Irish-American comedian who lives in Rialto.
- Gay Byrne, (b.1934, d.2019) renowned Irish broadcaster and inaugural host of The Late Late Show who grew up in the area.
- Emma Dabiri, Irish-Nigerian author, broadcaster and social historian who grew up in Rialto.
- Louisa Flanagan, (b.1882, d.1959) daughter of Michael Flanagan and wife of the First President of the Executive Council W. T. Cosgrave.
- Michael "The Alderman" Flanagan, (b.1833, d.1931) a local councillor who was elected to Dublin Corporation.
- Willie "The Bird" Flanagan, (b.1867, d.1925) son of Michael Flanagan and practical joker after whom the eponymous local public house is named.
- Kevin Moran, ex. Dublin GAA footballer and centre back for Manchester United and the Republic of Ireland, was born in the area.

== Landmarks ==
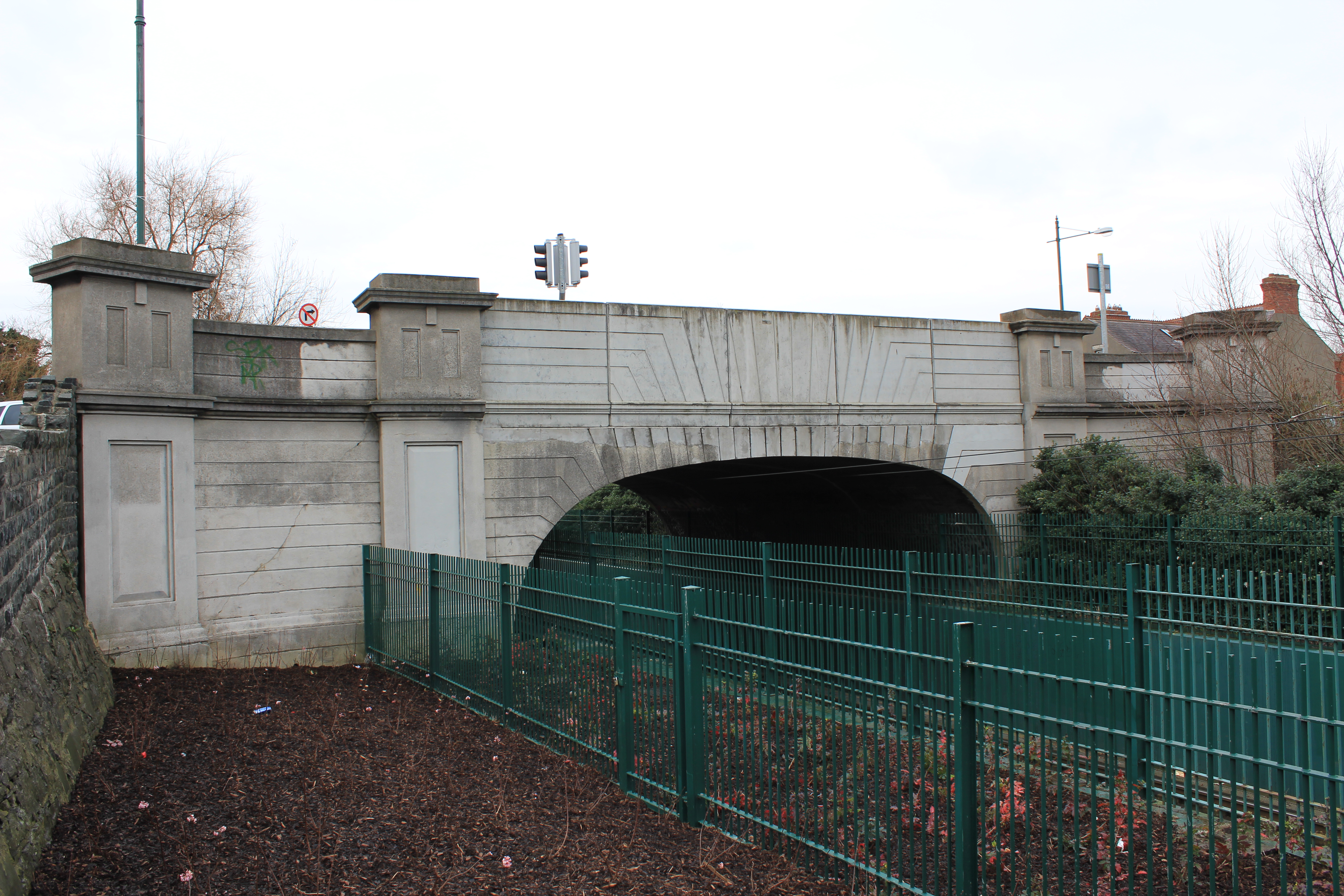
Rialto Bridge' carries the South Circular Road over the Luas Red Line

- Former Rialto Cinema
- The Bird Flanagan
- Rialto Parish Church

== See also ==
- New National Children's Hospital
- List of towns and villages in Ireland
