= Donore Harriers =

Athletic club

Donore Harriers is an athletics club founded in 1893. It is located in Chapelizod, Dublin.

Originally based in South Circular Road and then Islandbridge, the club moved to a modern clubhouse opposite the Chapelizod Gate to the Phoenix Park in 1993.

A new 300m polyurethane running track and athletics field was built on the club grounds in the autumn of 2007.

== Olympic Games representatives ==
- 1948 London: J.P. Reardon, C. Clancy
- 1956 Melbourne: E. Kinsella
- 1960 Rome: Bertie Messitt, W. Dunne
- 1964 Tokyo: B. Clifford, T. O’Riordan
- 1976 Montreal: Jim McNamara, E. Coghlan
- 1980 Moscow: E. Coghlan, S. Egan
- 1996 Atlanta: Roman Linscheid

== European Athletics Championships representatives ==
- 1954: Berne: E. Kinsella, B. O’Reilly
- 1958: Stockholm: B. Messitt
- 1962: Belgrade: B. Messitt
- 1966: Budapest: T. O’Riordan, J. McNamara
- 1974: Rome: E. Coghlan
- 1978: Prague: E. Coghlan
- 1982: Athens: S. Egan
- 1990: Split: V. McGovern
- 1998: Budapest: R. Linscheid
- 2014: Zurich: J. Travers

== See also ==
- Brendan Hackett, a member
