= Masters M50 10000 metres world record progression =

This is the progression of world record improvements of the 10000 metres M50 division of Masters athletics.

Key

Incomplete information Pending

| Hand | Auto | Athlete | Nationality | Birthdate | Age | Location | Date | Ref |
|---|---|---|---|---|---|---|---|---|
| | 30:55.16 | Peter De Vocht | Belgium | 7 September 1960 | 50 years, 1 day | Tessenderlo | 8 September 2010 | |
| | 30:56.08 | Ion Damian | Belgium | 7 February 1953 | 50 years, 145 days | Ninove | 2 July 2003 | |
| | 31:01.90 | Ron Robertson | New Zealand | 03.06.1941 | Turku | 20.07.1991 | | |
| | 31:50.40 | James McNamara | Ireland | 17.04.1939 | Dublin | 01.05.1989 | | |
| 32:05.5 | | Luciano Acquarone | Italy | 04.10.1930 | Genova | 17.10.1981 | | |
| 32:14.0 | | Alain Mimoun | France | 01.01.1921 | Colombes | 03.06.1972 | | |
