= Eamonn Coghlan =

Irish athlete

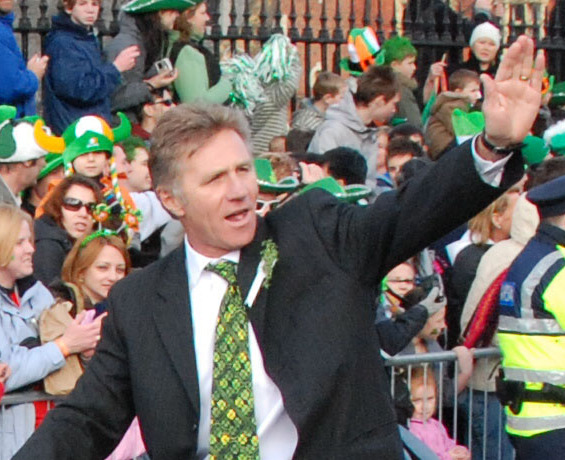
- Coghlan in 2008

Senator
- In office 25 May 2011 – 8 June 2016
- Constituency: Nominated by the Taoiseach

Personal details
- Born: 21 November 1952 (age 73) Drimnagh, Dublin, Ireland
- Party: Fine Gael; Independent
- Spouse: Yvonne
- Children: 4
- Education: Villanova University
- Sports career
- Sport: Athletics
- Event: middle/long-distance
- Club: Donore Harriers; NYAC; MSB Dublin

Eamonn Christopher Coghlan (born 21 November 1952) is an Irish former track and field athlete who specialised in middle distance track events and the 5,000 metres. He is a three-time Olympian, held the world indoor mile record and was world champion in the 5,000 m. Coghlan served as a senator from 2011 to 2016.

== Biography ==
Born in Drimnagh, he had a successful amateur running career in Ireland that led to a scholarship in the United States, where he won four NCAA titles in track running and ran a sub-four-minute mile to set an Irish record at 22 years of age. He soon set the European record over the distance. His speciality was the indoor mile run – he gained his nickname, "The Chairman of the Boards", as a result of his great success on the US indoor circuit. He broke the indoor mile world record on three occasions and also set a world indoor record over 2,000 m.

He finished fourth in the 1500 Metres at the 1976 Summer Olympics, fourth again in the 5,000 m at the 1980 Summer Olympics and made the 5,000 m semi-final in his last Olympic appearance at the 1988 Summer Olympics. He experienced greater success in the 1,500 m at the European Athletics Championships: he won the 1,500 m at the 1979 European Athletics Indoor Championships and outdoors took silver in the event at the 1978 European Athletics Championships. He was also the 5,000 m champion at the IAAF World Cup in 1981 and he became the world 5,000 metres champion at the 1983 World Championships in Athletics.

Additionally he won the British AAA Championships title in the 1500 metres event at the 1977 AAA Championships and the 5,000 metres champion in 1979 and 1981.

After competitive retirement, he continued to race and became the first man over 40 years old to run a sub-four-minute mile. He has appeared as a panellist on Irish broadcaster RTÉ and released his autobiography, Chairman of the Boards, Master of the Mile, in 2008.

In May 2011, Coghlan was appointed as a Senator by the Taoiseach Enda Kenny.

== Early life ==
Coghlan was born in Drimnagh, Dublin, Republic of Ireland, and educated at St. Vincent's C.B.S., Glasnevin. He lived in Rye, New York for a number of years in the 1980s before returning to live in Ireland. He was a childhood friend of Brian Kerr, who went on to manage the Ireland national football team.

Coghlan's first running club was the Celtic Athletic Club. He then joined Donore Harriers. After the Moscow Olympics in 1980, he moved to Metropolitan Harriers where he was coached by Gerry Farnan. He won the Leinster colleges cross country championships & the 5000m track title in 1970. The following year he won the All-Ireland 1500 metres and 5000 metres titles. In 1971 he was offered a scholarship by Villanova University. The famous running coach James 'Jumbo' Elliott invited Coghlan to train for the Villanova track and field team. While there he won four NCAA individual titles over 1500 meters and the mile. On 10 May 1975 Coghlan ran his first sub-4-minute mile in Pittsburgh, Pennsylvania (3:56.2). One week later, on 17 May, he broke the long-standing European Outdoor Mile record of Michel Jazy, in a time of 3:53.3 in Kingston, Jamaica. He graduated from Villanova University, Pennsylvania, USA in 1976 with a Bachelor of Science degree in Marketing and Communications.

== Personal life ==
He and his wife, Yvonne, have four children. His youngest son, John, is one of Ireland's leading athletes who won a team gold medal in the European Cross Country Championships in Portugal in 2010. His eldest son, Eamonn, is a golf professional at Hearthstone Country Club, Houston, Texas.

== Career ==
=== Indoor career ===
Medal record

Men's athletics

Representing Ireland

World Championships
Gold medal – first place	1983 Helsinki	5000 m

European Championships
Silver medal – second place	1978 Prague	1500 m

European Indoor Championships
Gold medal – first place	1979 Vienna	1500 m

Coghlan was nicknamed "The Chairman of the Boards" because of his success on indoor tracks. He won 52 of his 70 races at 1,500 m and 1 Mile from 1974 to 1987. He set the world record for the indoor mile run with a time of 3.52.6 at the San Diego Sports Arena in San Diego in 1979. He lowered this to 3:50.6 in 1981 and then bettered it to 3:49.78 in 1983 at New Jersey's Meadowlands Arena indoor arena. His record stood until 1997 when it was broken by Morocco's Hicham El Guerrouj in a time of 3:48.45. It stood as the Irish record until 2025, when Andrew Coscoran set a new record of 3:49.26. Coghlan's 1983 time was the fastest mile ever run in the United States until 10 June 2007, when Daniel Kipchirchir Komen ran 3:48.28 outdoors in Eugene, Oregon. It remains one of only four sub-3:50 miles run on American soil. By and large, Coghlan was more successful at indoor running notwithstanding a later world title in 1983 over 5,000 meters.

Coghlan also set the record for the indoor 2,000 meter run at 4:54.07 in 1987, which stood until Haile Gebrselassie of Ethiopia ran 4:52.86 in 1998 (which was broken in 2007 when Kenenisa Bekele of Ethiopia ran 4:49.99). Coghlan won the world-famous Wanamaker Mile at the Millrose Games in NYC's Madison Square Garden a record seven times (1977, 1979–81, 1983, 1985, 1987) his last win being at the age of 34. His record stood for over twenty years with Bernard Lagat winning for an eighth time in 2010: Coghlan fired the starting pistol to the record-breaking race and presented Lagat with a trophy.

=== Outdoor career ===
He won the 5,000 metres at the 1983 World Championships to follow two fourth places in the Olympics (in the 1,500 meters in 1976 and the 5,000 meters in 1980).

In the 1976 Olympics, he probably made a mistake by taking the lead at 500 metres and by not accelerating enough before the winner, John Walker, passed him at 1,200 metres. Thus he lost valuable energy which he would have needed in the home straight's struggle against Walker, Belgium's Ivo van Damme and West Germany's Paul-Heinz Wellman. In the 1980 Olympics 5,000 metres he probably made a mistake by sprinting to the lead at the start of the last back straight.

In any case, he led the race for only a few seconds before Ethiopia's Miruts Yifter kicked past him on the inside. By contrast, in the 1983 World Championships in Athletics 5,000 metres, Coghlan was in peak shape and ran intelligently, catching the Soviet Union's Dmitry Dmitriyev on the last back straight and sprinting past him with about 120 metres to go. He ran the last 1,000 metres very fast, in 2:24.77, and won the race by 1.67 seconds, despite clearly slowing down in the final metres. He also won silver at the 1978 European Championships in Prague over 1500m, in 3:36.57, behind Steve Ovett of Great Britain, and in 1979, he competed in his only European Indoor Championships (he raced sparingly on the European indoor circuit due to his indoor commitments in the US), taking the gold medal in the 1500 m in Vienna. In December 1979 he ran the only sub 50-minute time in the Waterhouse Byrne Baird Shield 10 Mile Cross Country. In 1981, Eamonn won the gold medal at 5000m in the IAAF World Cup, competing for Europe (not shown in the medal table above). He missed out on the 1982 European Championships and the 1984 Olympic Games due to injury. Coghlan was eliminated in the 5000-metre semi-finals at the 1988 Seoul Olympics In 1985, he was a member of Ireland's four-man squad along with Marcus O'Sullivan, Frank O'Mara and Ray Flynn, which set a world record time of 15:49.08 in the 4 x mile relay, in a charity fund-raising race in Dublin.

In total, Coghlan ran 83 sub-4-minute miles, indoor and out.

== Life after retirement ==
In 1994, on the Harvard University indoor track, Eamonn became the first man over age 40 to run a sub-four-minute mile, in a time of 3:58.15. He was 41 at the time. Coghlan ran the sub-four-minute mile as a "Special Attraction" during the middle of the Massachusetts State High School Championship meet. Athletes surrounded the banked track clapping and pounding out the rhythm of :59 sec. splits on the fast Harvard track.

Coghlan works as director of fundraising (North America) for the Children's Medical & Research Foundation, Our Lady's Children's Hospital, Dublin and is a regular panellist on Ireland's television station RTÉ for athletics programmes. He coaches a number of Irish international runners including David Campbell, David Fitzmaurice and his son John.

In 2002, he appeared in part two of the original Mrs Browns Boys series.

In 2008, he served as Grand Marshal for Dublin's St Patrick's Day parade.

Coghlan's book Chairman of the Boards, Master of the Mile was released in 2008.

== Political career ==
In May 2011, he was appointed as a Senator by the Taoiseach Enda Kenny. He sat as an independent until 7 February 2012, when he joined the Fine Gael party.

He ran as the Fine Gael candidate in the 2014 Dublin West by-election. During an election debate on Tonight with Vincent Browne, he baffled viewers and panel members by telling a bizarre anecdote, including an impersonation, about a constituent he had met during his canvass. His campaign largely "fell flat on its face" according to a Fine Gael minister, despite the party putting significant resources into the constituency He polled 3,788 first preference votes, placing fifth in the contest and being eliminated on the fourth count. This was a 1.9% drop in the Fine Gael vote, compared to the previous by-election result in the same constituency.

He unsuccessfully ran for election to the Administrative Panel of the Seanad in 2016, getting 3% of first preference votes, and was not re-nominated to the Seanad.

== Personal bests ==
Surface	Event	Time	Date	Place
Outdoor Track	1500 Metres	3:36.57	3 September 1978	Prague
Outdoor Track	One Mile	3:51.59	9 July 1983	Oslo
Outdoor Track	5,000 metres	13:19.13	19 August 1981	Zürich
Outdoor Track	10,000 metres	28:19.3	24 April 1986	Philadelphia
Indoor Track	1500 Metres	3:35.6	20 Feb 1981	San Diego
Indoor Track	One Mile	3:49.78	27 February 1983	East Rutherford
Indoor Track	2,000 Metres	4:54.07	21 February 1987	Inglewood
Road	Marathon	2:25:13	3 November 1991	New York

Sporting positions
Preceded by (United States) Rudy Chapa	Men's 3000 m Best Year Performance; 1980	Succeeded by (United States) Steve Scott
