= James's Luas stop =

Tram stop in Dublin, Ireland

James's Ospidéal San Séamas
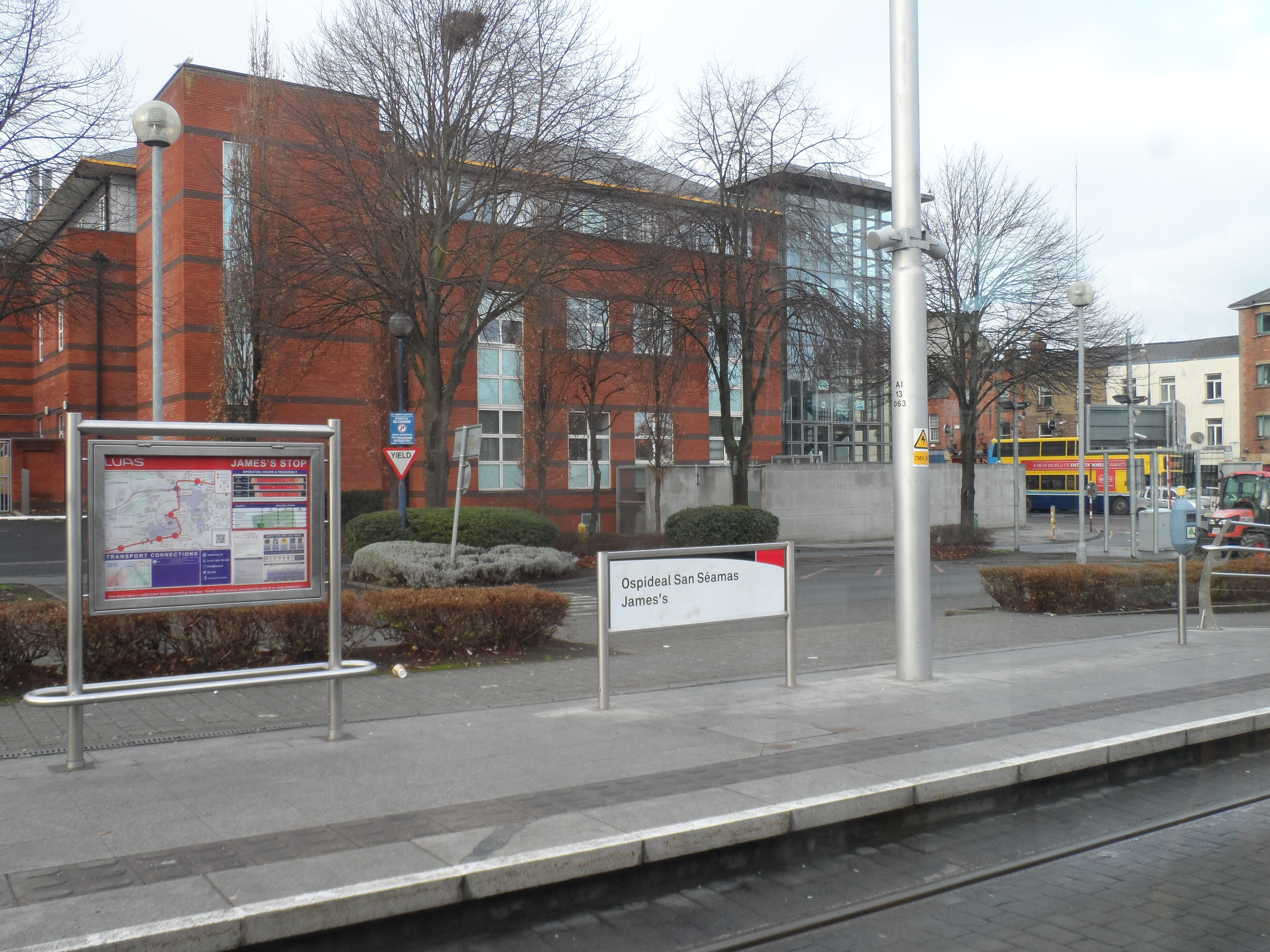
- The Northbound platform at James's

General information
- Location: Dublin; Ireland
- Coordinates: 53°20′31″N 6°17′36″W
- Owner: Transport Infrastructure Ireland
- Operator: Luas
- Line: Red
- Platforms: 2
- Bus routes: 5
- Bus operators: Dublin Bus; Go-Ahead Ireland
- Connections: 13; 73; G1; G2; S2

Construction
- Structure type: At-grade

Other information
- Fare zone: Red 2

Key dates
- 26 September 2004: Station opened

Services
Preceding station	Luas	Following station
Fatima towards Saggart or Tallaght	Red Line	Heuston towards The Point or Connolly
Location
- Location within Central Dublin

James's (Irish: Ospidéal San Séamas) is a stop on the Luas light-rail tram system in Dublin, Ireland. It opened in 2004 as a stop on the Red Line. The stop is located within the grounds of St. James's Hospital, next to the Trinity Centre for Health Sciences. It also provides access to the National College of Art and Design and Guinness Storehouse. The stop has two edge platforms, and is of the same design as many Luas stops. After departing the stop, northbound trams turn right onto James's Street on their way to Connolly or The Point. Southbound trams continue on their own right of way through the grounds of the hospital, with grass between the tracks, travelling towards Tallaght or Saggart.

The stop is also served by Dublin Bus routes 13, G1, G2 and S2, and Go-Ahead Ireland route 73.
