= Fatima Mansions (housing) =

Public housing estate in Dublin, Ireland

- Interactive map of Fatima Mansions

General information
- Location: Rialto, Dublin, Ireland
- Coordinates: 53.337°N 6.293°W
- Status: Demolished and rebuilt under Public Private Partnership between 2004 and 2007.

Construction
- Constructed: late 1930s-1947

Fatima Mansions is an extensive public housing complex located in Rialto, Dublin. Construction began in the 1930s but delays meant residents first occupied in 1947. In the early 21st century, the complex underwent a substantial urban renewal programme with the assistance of public and private funding. All existing apartment blocks were demolished to make way for 600 accommodation units, consisting of social, affordable and private housing along with community, business and leisure facilities at a cost of €200 million. The blocks have since been renamed Herberton Apartments, but the area is still referred to locally as Fatima, which is the name of the adjacent Luas Red Line tram stop.

== History ==
Work on the original complex started before World War II under the direction of Dublin Corporation (now Dublin City Council) but construction was held up due to material shortages. The first phase of construction was finally completed after the war and the first tenants began to move in during 1947: the development consisted of fifteen blocks, each of four floors in height. They replaced tenement housing for the area's working-class residents, and provided a great improvement in living conditions. In the mid 1980s the area became notorious for its high levels of heroin use and drug dealing, which eventually led to the original complex's demolition due to the drug problem's severity.

The Fatima Mansions were an Irish art rock group named after the flats. Speaking in 2021, lead singer of the band Cathal Coughlan agreed that he had a "pang of guilt" for calling the band Fatima Mansions and said that the name of the band was "emphatically not poking fun at poor social conditions that were being foisted upon people in inner-city Dublin".
