= Drimnagh Luas stop =

Tram stop in Dublin, Ireland

Drimnagh Droimeanach
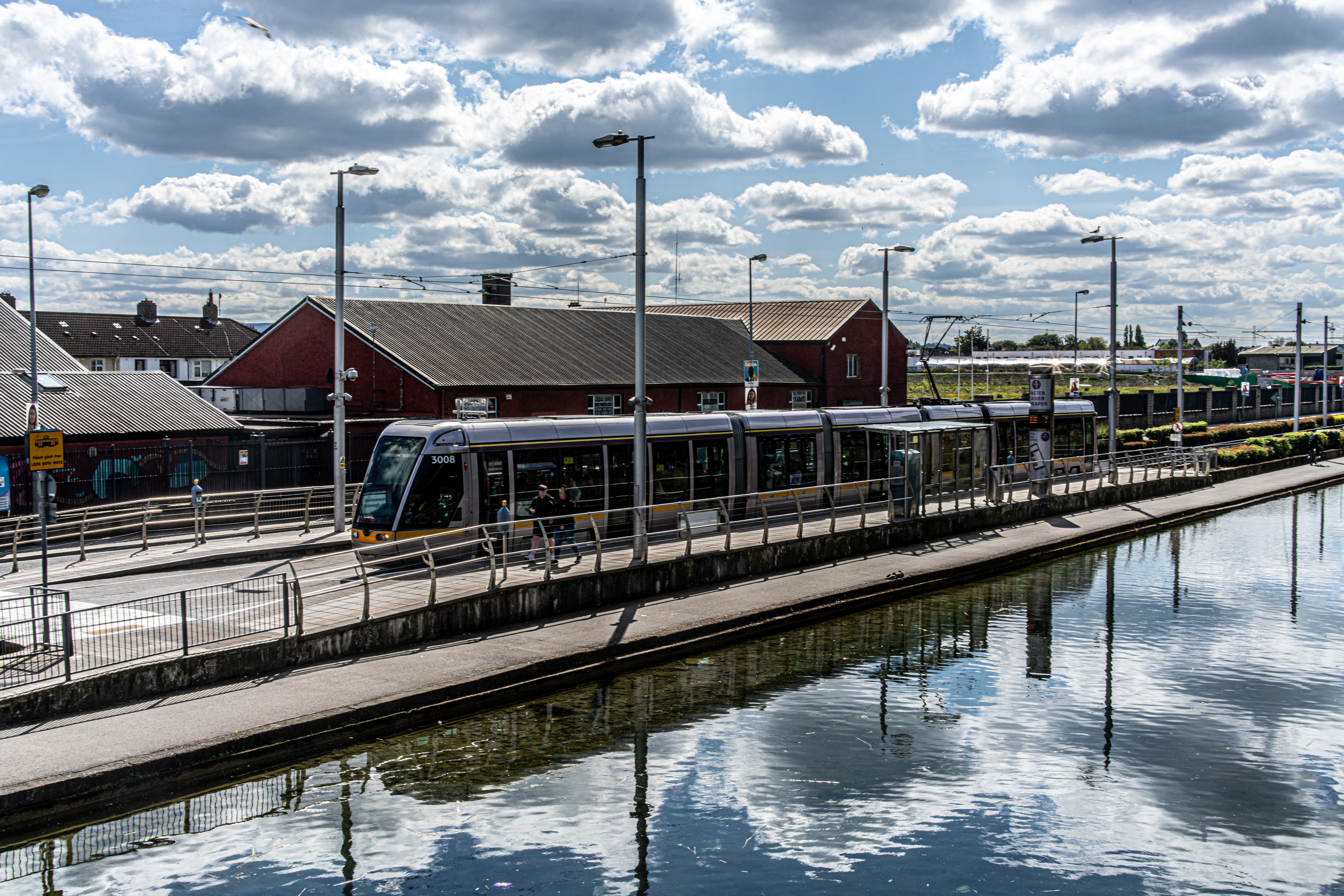
- Drimnagh stop as seen from the footbridge

General information
- Location: Dublin; Ireland
- Coordinates: 53°20′07″N 6°19′05″W
- Owner: Transport Infrastructure Ireland
- Operator: Luas
- Line: Red
- Platforms: 2
- Bus routes: 1
- Bus operators: Dublin Bus
- Connections: 123

Construction
- Structure type: At-grade

Other information
- Fare zone: Red 3

Key dates
- 26 September 2004: Station opened

Services
Preceding station	Luas	Following station
Blackhorse towards Saggart or Tallaght	Red Line	Goldenbridge towards The Point or Connolly
Proposed
Blackhorse towards Newcastle Road	Line F	Goldenbridge towards Trinity
Location
- Location within Dublin

Drimnagh (Irish: Droimeanach) is a stop on the Luas light-rail tram system in Dublin, Ireland. It opened in 2004 as a stop on the Red Line. The stop is located on a section of track which runs alongside the Grand Canal, in Drimnagh. It provides access to Our Lady's Children's Hospital, Crumlin and the Richmond Barracks.

The stop was built at the same time as a footbridge which allows access to areas on the north of the canal. However, unlike the nearby Goldenbridge, the bridge is not step-free accessible.

The stop is also served by Dublin Bus route 123.

Drimnagh is intended to be a stop on the proposed Luas line to Lucan.

== Gallery ==
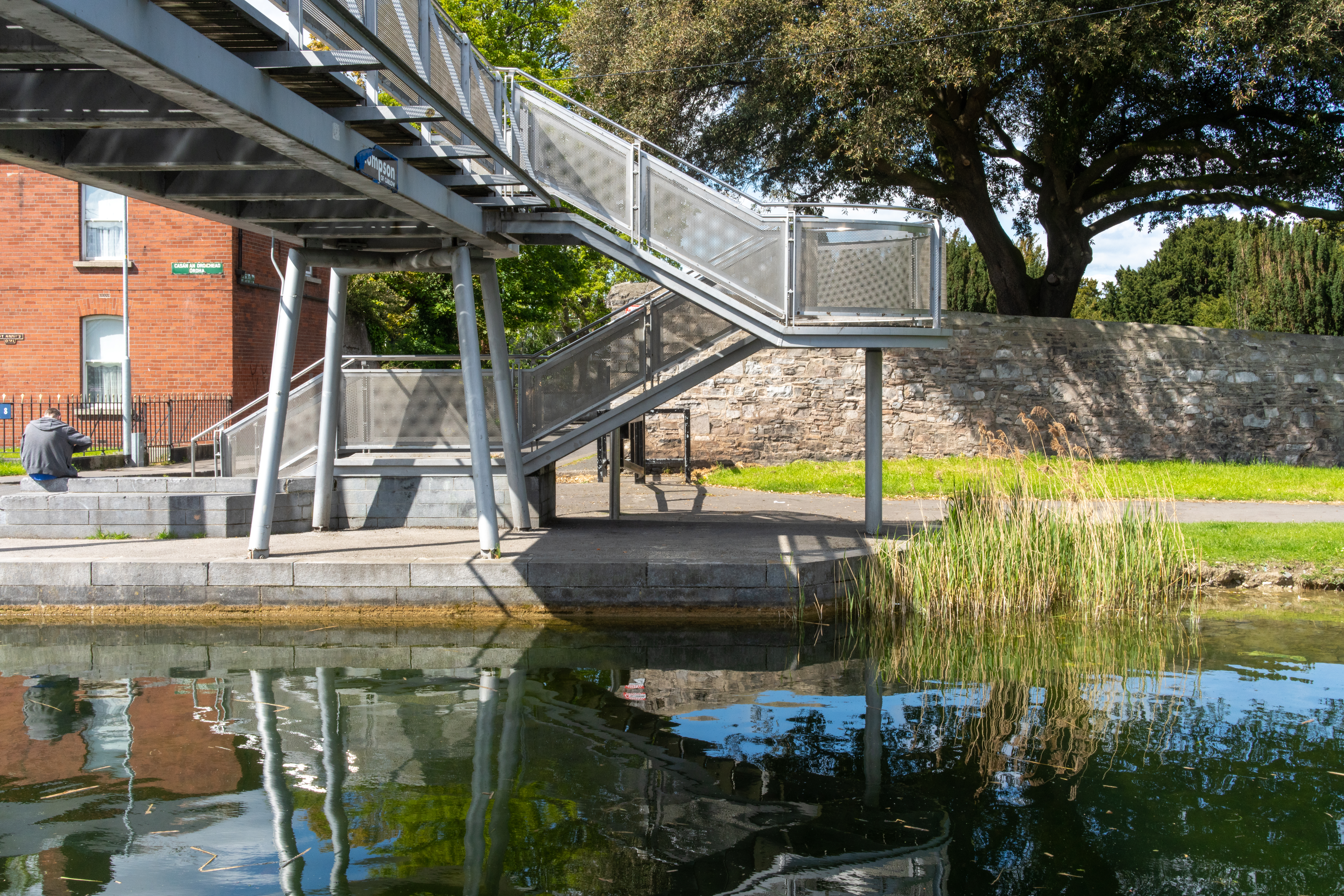
Staircase leading to the footbridge

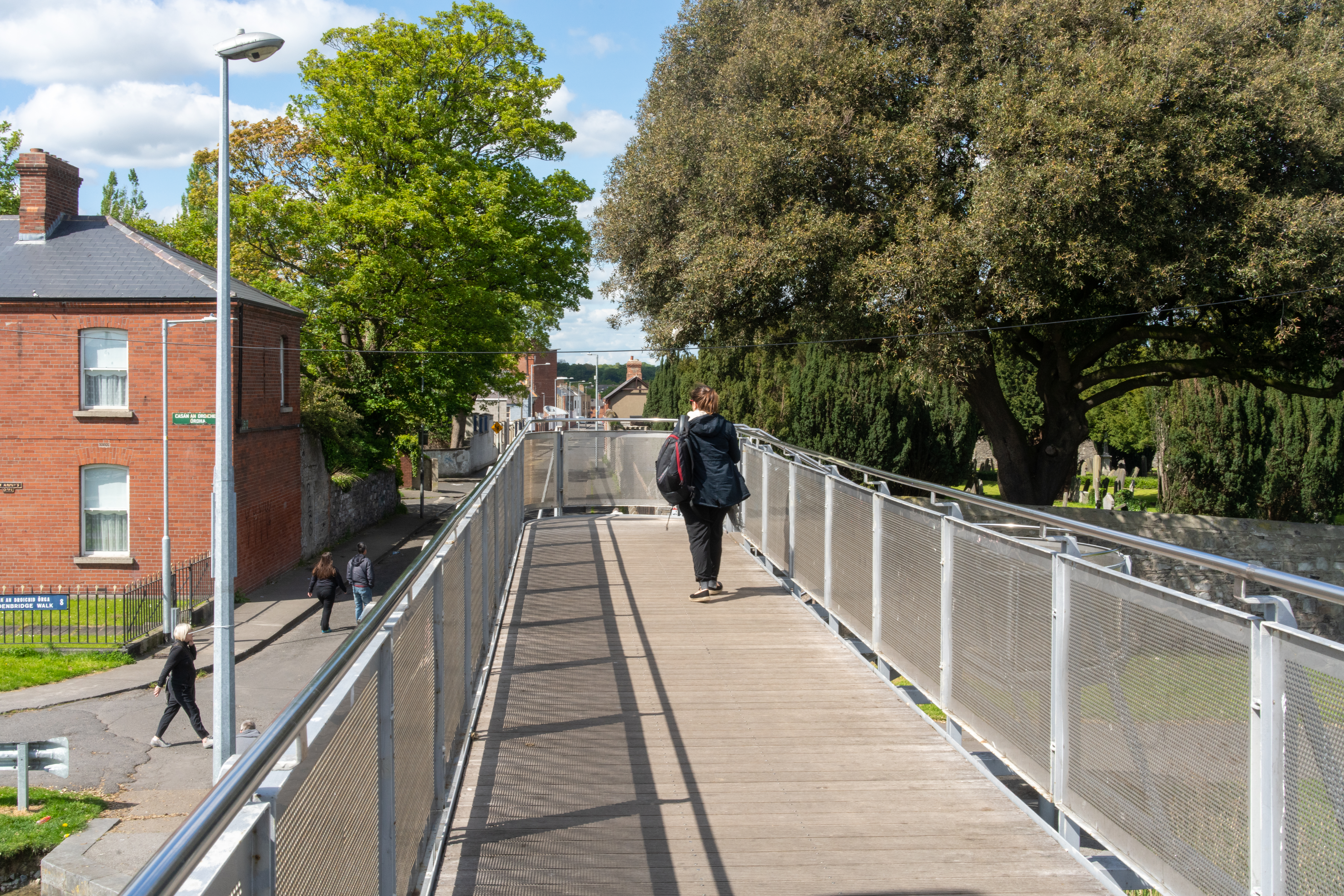
The deck of the footbridge

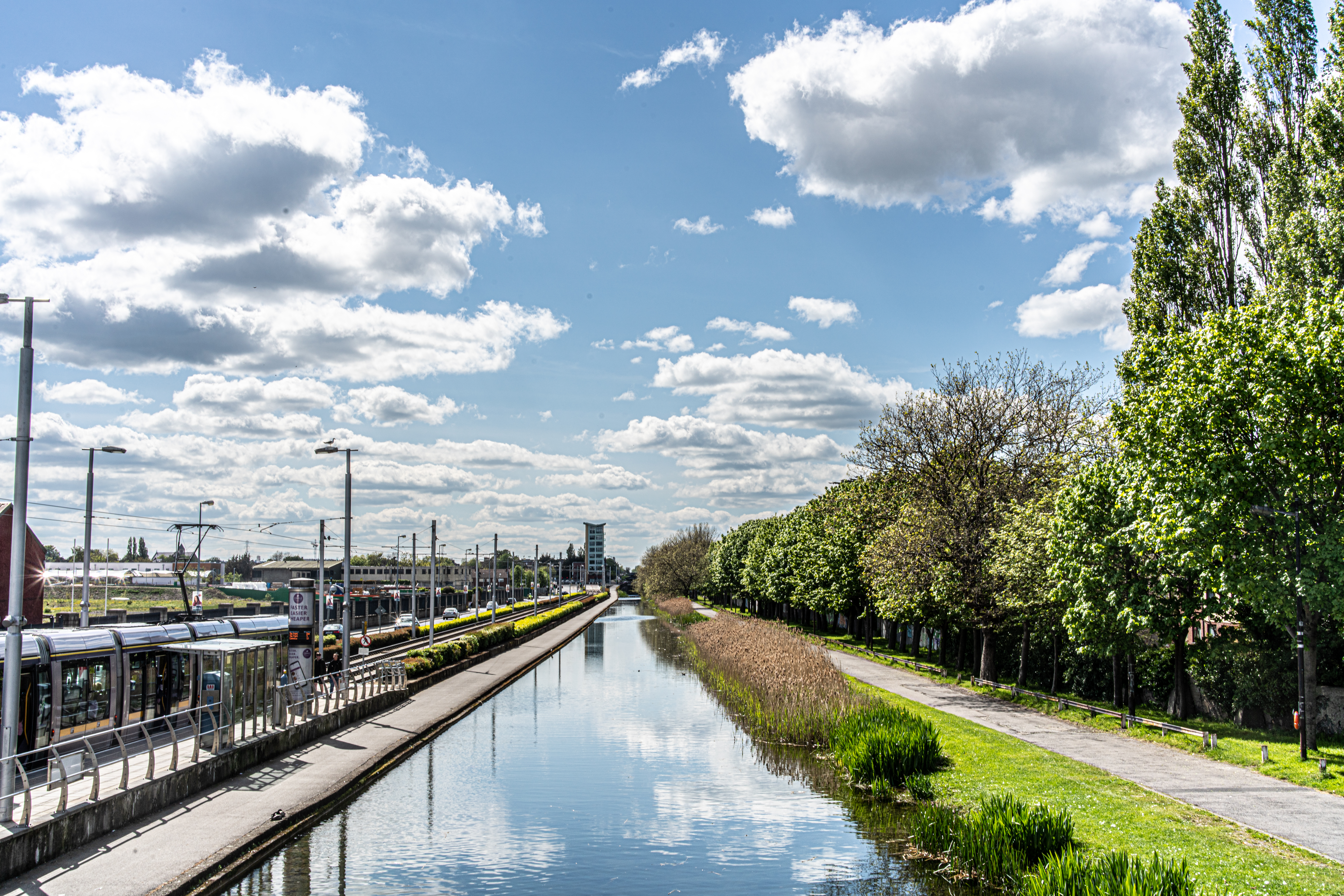
A tram stops at Drimnagh
