= Goldenbridge Luas stop =

Tram stop in Dublin, Ireland

Goldenbridge An Droichead Órga
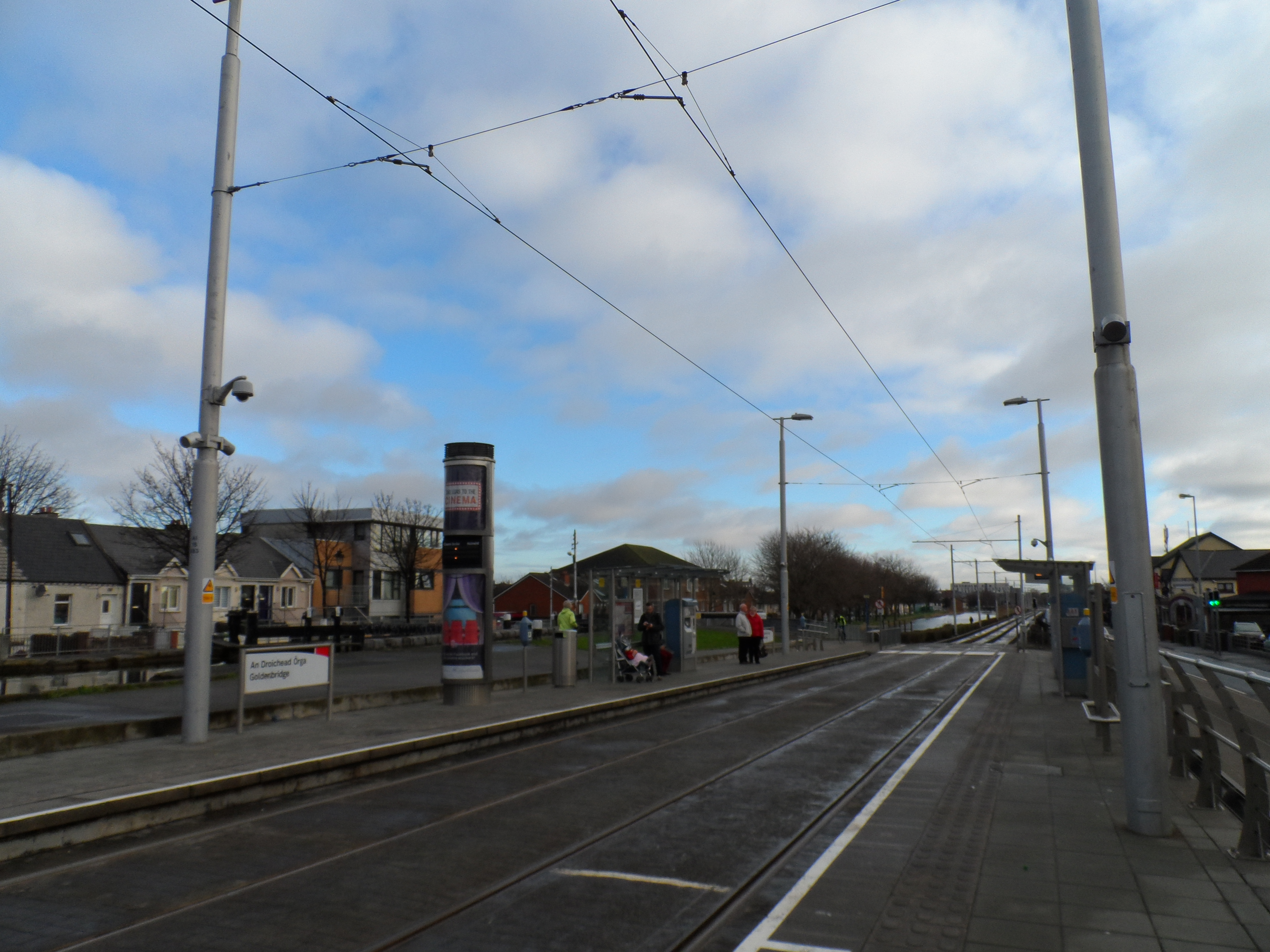
- Goldenbridge Luas stop

General information
- Location: Dublin; Ireland
- Coordinates: 53°20′09″N 6°18′49″W
- Owner: Transport Infrastructure Ireland
- Operator: Luas
- Line: Red
- Platforms: 2
- Bus routes: 1
- Bus operators: Dublin Bus
- Connections: 123

Construction
- Structure type: At-grade

Other information
- Fare zone: Red 3

Key dates
- 26 September 2004: Station opened

Services
Preceding station	Luas	Following station
Drimnagh towards Saggart or Tallaght	Red Line	Suir Road towards The Point or Connolly
Proposed
Drimnagh towards Newcastle Road	Line F	Suir Road towards Trinity
Location
- Location within Dublin

Goldenbridge (Irish: An Droichead Órga) is a stop on the Luas light-rail tram system in Dublin, Ireland. It opened in 2004 as a stop on the Red Line. The stop is located next to a lock on a section of track which runs alongside the Grand Canal, near Goldenbridge Cemetery.

The area is named for the Golden Bridge (formerly Glydon Bridge) which carries Emmett Road over the River Camac, some 800m away from the Luas stop. This is thought to be a corruption of Irish: gabhailín, meaning "little fork", in reference to a nearby fork in the road.

The stop includes a level bridge crossing the lock, allowing access to nearby areas on the north side of the canal.

The stop is also served by Dublin Bus route 123.

Goldenbridge is intended to be a stop on the proposed Luas line to Lucan.
