= Michael Flanagan (councillor) =

Alderman Michael Flanagan (29 September 1833 – 16 October 1931), known as "the Alderman", was a farmer, market gardener, justice of the peace and Irish nationalist politician and long-time member of Dublin Corporation, setting the record for the longest tenure on the corporation at that time, retiring at the age of 86.

A member of the corporation from 1884 to 1919, Flanagan is said to have turned down the Lord Mayoralty of Dublin in 1900 because as a nationalist he did not wish to receive Queen Victoria on her visit to Ireland. He was listed as a justice of the peace as of 1894.

Flanagan was the father of the practical joker Willie "The Bird" Flanagan, and of Louisa Flanagan, wife of the First President of the Executive Council W. T. Cosgrave. As a landowner and market gardener, Flanagan supplied much of Dublin with vegetables.

Flanagan and his family lived in an 1820 house off the South Circular Road, Portmahon House, Rialto. He owned extensive lands around South-West County Dublin. In 2014 Dublin City Council named a community garden on the site of the former Fatima Mansions as "Flanagan's Fields" after him.
