= Blackhorse Luas stop =

Tram stop in Dublin, Ireland

Blackhorse An Capall Dubh
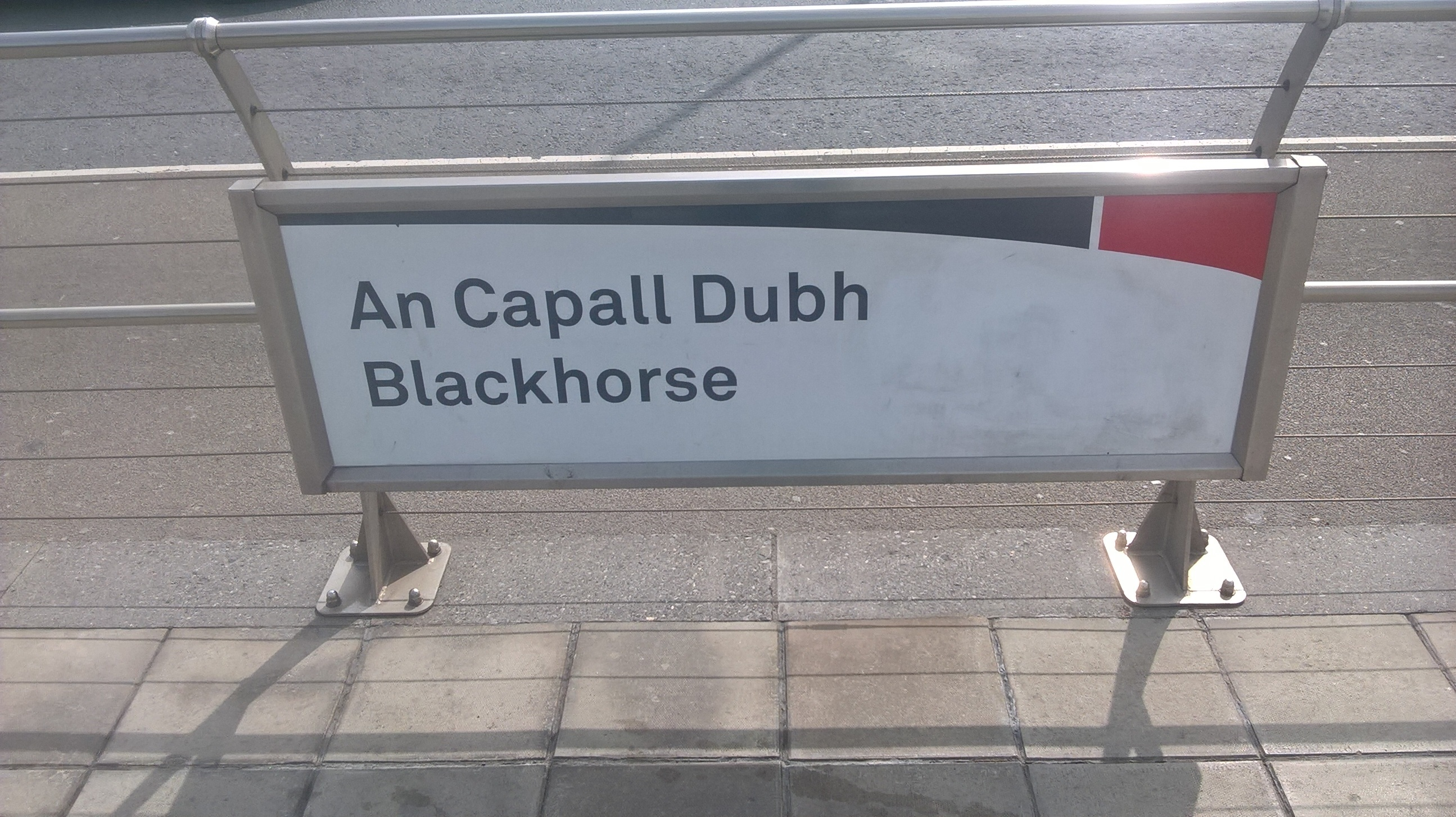
- The Platform sign at Blackhorse

General information
- Location: Dublin; Ireland
- Coordinates: 53°20′03″N 6°19′39″W
- Owner: Transport Infrastructure Ireland
- Operator: Luas
- Line: Red
- Platforms: 2

Construction
- Structure type: At-grade

Other information
- Fare zone: Red 3

Key dates
- 26 September 2004: Station opened

Services
Preceding station	Luas	Following station
Bluebell towards Saggart or Tallaght	Red Line	Drimnagh towards The Point or Connolly
Proposed
Kylemore Park towards Newcastle Road	Line F	Drimnagh towards Trinity
Location
- Location within Dublin

Blackhorse (Irish: An Capall Dubh) is a stop on the Luas light-rail tram system in Dublin, Ireland. It opened in 2004 as a stop on the Red Line. The stop is located at the intersection of Davitt Road and Naas Road. The stop has two edge platforms, and is of the same design as many Luas stops. After departing the stop, northbound trams head along a section of track which runs adjacent to the Grand Canal on their way to Connolly or The Point. Southbound trams turn onto Naas Road, travelling south-west towards Tallaght or Saggart.

The stop lies adjacent to Blackhorse bridge and a former pub called The Black Horse.

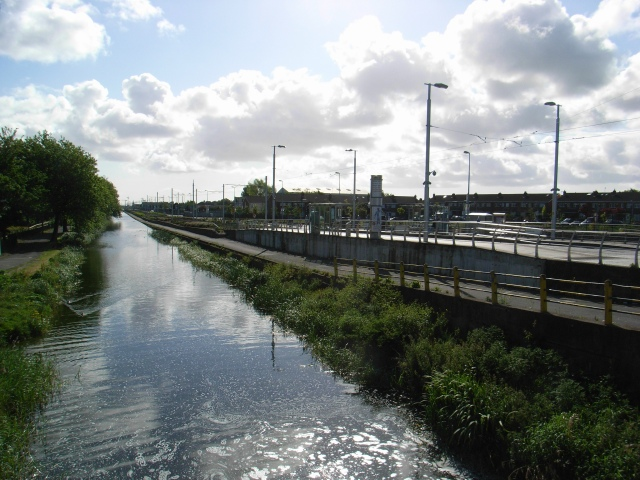
Blackhorse as seen from across the canal

== Proposals ==
In 2007, a proposal was announced for a Luas line from the city centre to Lucan. As of 2020, the project had not been officially approved but under the proposal, the new line would share track with the Red Line between Blackhorse and Fatima. Blackhorse would therefore become a junction stop, with trams en route to Lucan from the city centre diverging from the red line and continuing along the bank of the royal canal.

== Incidents ==
On 28 June 2012, a 32-year-old woman intending to board a tram at Blackhorse fell onto the tracks as the tram was pulling in and was caught between the tram and the platform. She was freed, rushed to hospital, and died on 6 July. As of 2020, she is the only passenger to have been killed in an incident on the Luas.
