= Suir Road Luas stop =

Tram stop in Dublin, Ireland

Suir Road Bóthar na Siúire
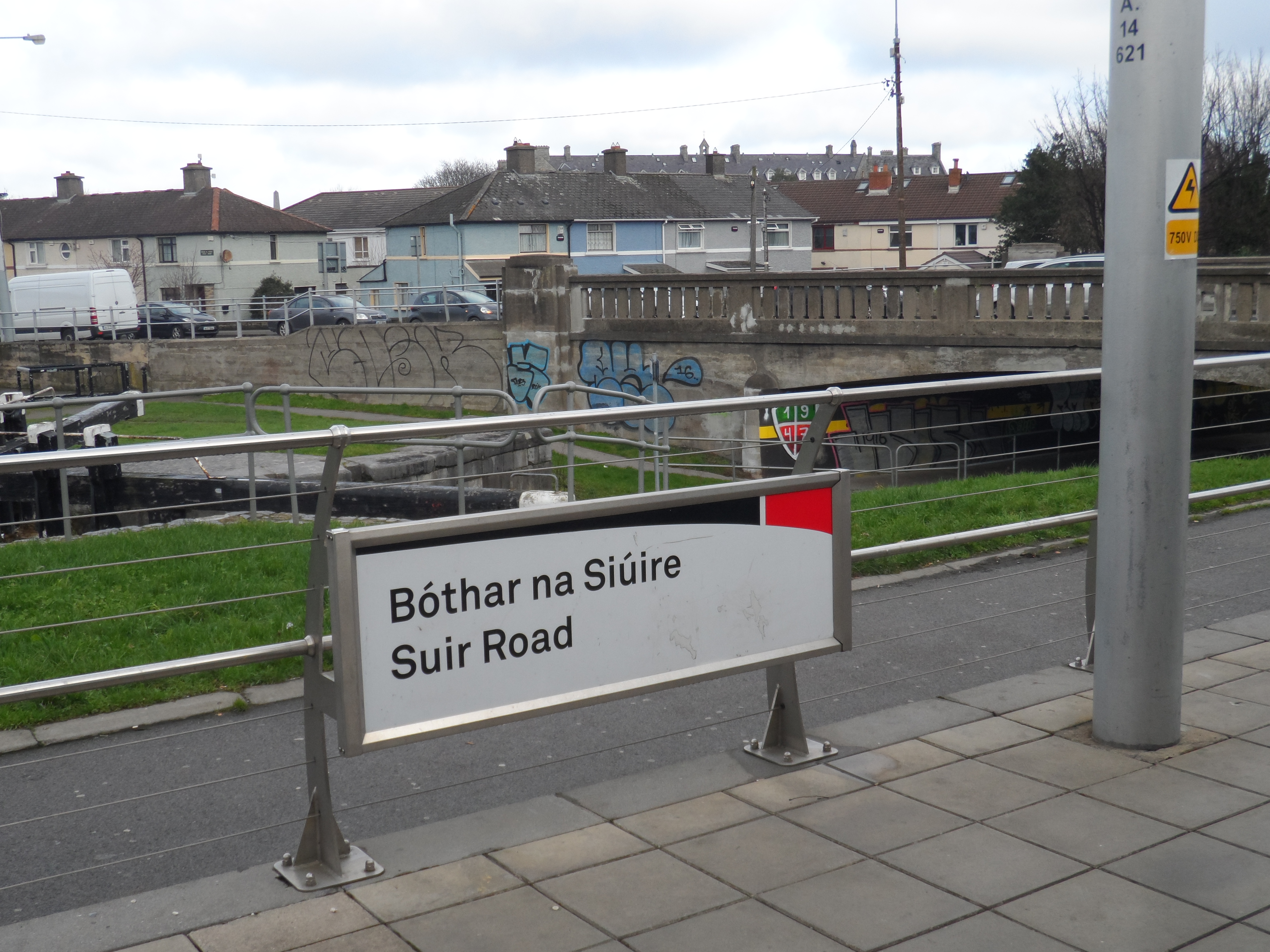
- Platform Sign at Suir Road

General information
- Location: Dublin; Ireland
- Coordinates: 53°20′12″N 6°18′26″W
- Owner: Transport Infrastructure Ireland
- Operator: Luas
- Line: Red
- Platforms: 2
- Bus routes: 1
- Bus operators: Dublin Bus
- Connections: 123

Construction
- Structure type: At-grade

Other information
- Fare zone: Red 2/3

Key dates
- 26 September 2004: Station opened

Services
Preceding station	Luas	Following station
Goldenbridge towards Saggart or Tallaght	Red Line	Rialto towards The Point or Connolly
Proposed
Goldenbridge towards Newcastle Road	Line F	Rialto towards Trinity
Location
- Location within Central Dublin

Suir Road (Irish: Bóthar na Siúire) is a stop on the Luas light-rail tram system in Dublin, Ireland. It opened in 2004 as a stop on the Red Line. The stop is located at the intersection of Suir Road, Davitt Road and Dolphin Road, next to a Canal Lock.

To the west of the stop, the tram line runs alongside the bank of the Grand Canal. To the east, the line crosses the canal on the Ann Devlin Bridge (named after prominent Irish republican Anne Devlin, whose name is mis-spelt on the dedication plaque), and then continues along the route of a derelict branch of the canal (the remaining navigable portion of the canal continues south-east, forming a ring around central Dublin).

The stop is also served by Dublin Bus route 123.

Suir Road is intended to be a stop on the proposed Luas line to Lucan.
