= James McNamara (athlete) =

Irish long-distance runner (1939–2016)

James McNamara (17 April 1939 – 9 March 2016) was an Irish athlete. He participated in the 1976 Olympics men's marathon, finishing 39th.

He continued to run into the masters age divisions, setting the M50 world record for 10,000 metres at 31:51.40 on 1 May 1989. His record held until the 1991 Masters Athletics World Championships, when Ron Robertson was challenged by M45 record holder Antonio Villanueva, with both surpassing McNamara's record.

He died on 9 March 2016, aged 76.
