= St. James's Hospital =

- Health Service Executive
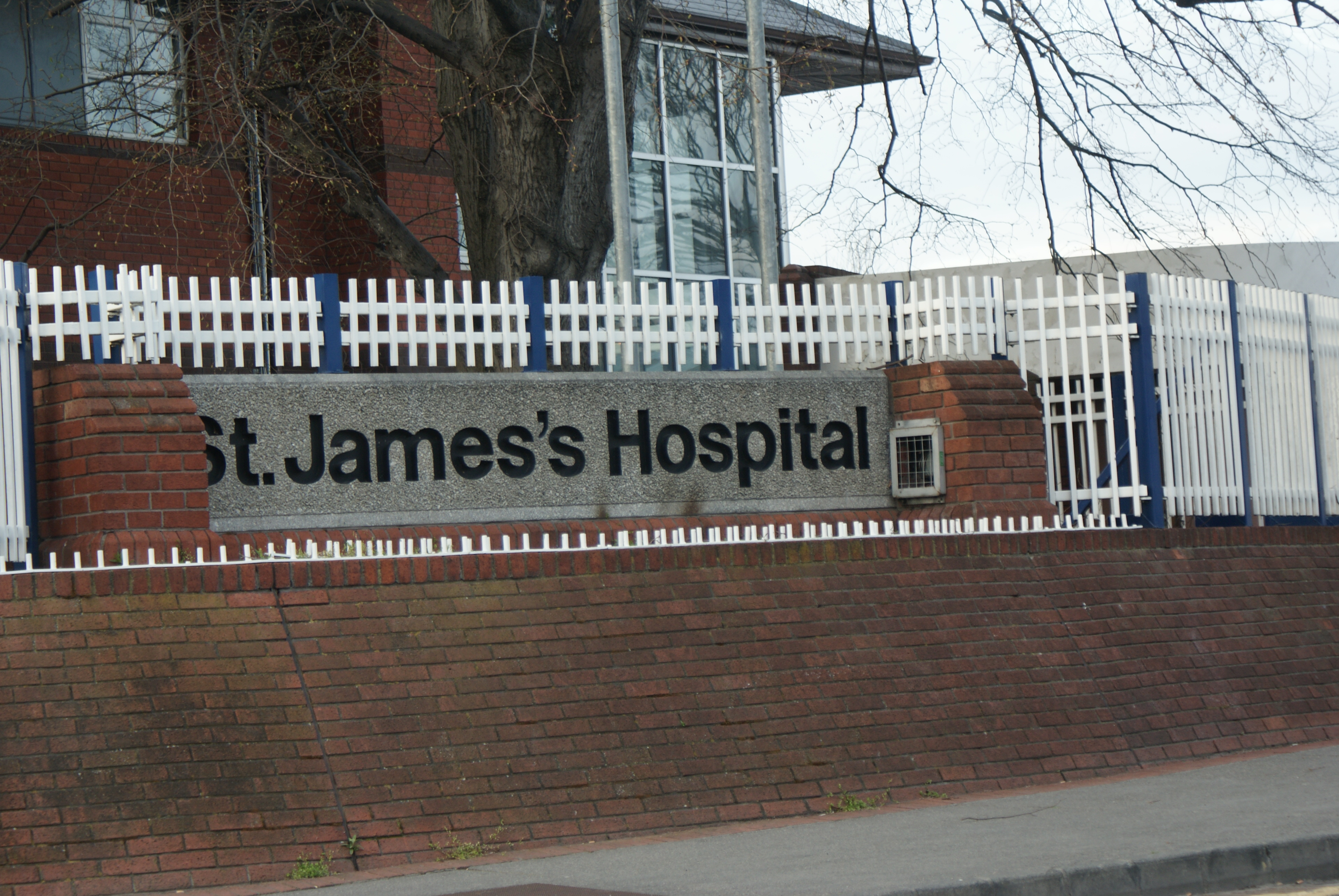
- South Circular Road entrance to St. James's Hospital

- Shown in Dublin

Geography
- Location: James's Street, Dublin 8, Ireland, Dublin, Ireland
- Coordinates: 53.3397°N 6.2945°W

Organisation
- Care system: HSE
- Type: Teaching hospital
- Affiliated university: Trinity College Dublin

Services
- Beds: 1,010

History
- Founded: 1727

Links
- Website: http://www.stjames.ie
- Lists: Hospitals in the Republic of Ireland

St. James's Hospital (Irish: Ospidéal San Séamas) is a teaching hospital in Dublin, Ireland. Its academic partner is Trinity College Dublin. It is managed by Dublin Midlands Hospital Group.

== History ==
The origins of the hospital lie in a poorhouse initiated when Dublin Corporation paid £300 to acquire the site in 1603. The war between William III and James II intervened and the project was abandoned until Mary, Duchess of Ormonde, wife of James Butler, 2nd Duke of Ormonde laid a foundation stone in 1703. The pamphleteer, Jonathan Swift, lobbied for the creation of facilities for abandoned infants and, in 1727, the poorhouse was expanded by the addition of a foundling hospital. The brewer Arthur Guinness served on the board of directors in its early years.

The foundling hospital closed in 1829 and the buildings were absorbed by the South Dublin Union Workhouse. During the Easter Rising in 1916, the South Dublin Union Workhouse was occupied by rebel forces. The poorhouse evolved to become a municipal hospital known as St Kevin's Hospital, following Irish independence in 1921, and changed its name to St. James's Hospital in 1971.

The Trinity Centre, which incorporates the clinical departments of Trinity College's Medical School and its medical library, opened in 1994.

A new radiation therapy unit for cancer treatment was established at the hospital in 2012.

The St James's campus was chosen in 2012 as the site for the National Paediatric Hospital, allowing colocation with the adult hospital, and potentially "trilocation" with a future maternity hospital on the same site.

In 2015, the hospital became the first hospital in Ireland to introduce routine testing for HIV and hepatitis for all patients arriving at the hospital.

== Services ==
The hospital, which is the main teaching hospital for Trinity College Dublin, has 1,010 beds.

== Transport ==
The hospital is served by James's Luas stop, as well as a number of Dublin Bus routes.

== Notable people ==
- Anne Young, founder of the first Irish school of general nursing.
