= Brittas Pond =

Artificial lake(s) in County Dublin, Ireland

Brittas Ponds
- Brittas Reservoir, Brittas Lake(s), Glenaraneen Lake, Glenaraneen Mill Ponds
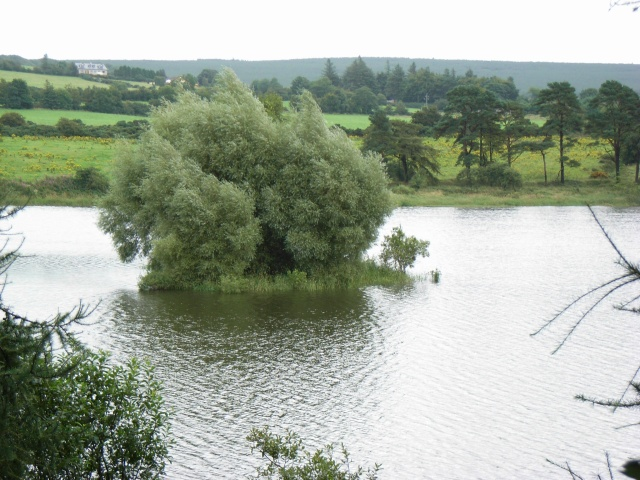

- Location within Ireland
- Location: Brittas, County Dublin
- Coordinates: 53.2424°N 6.4535°W
- Type: Artificial Lake
- Primary inflows: River Camac
- Primary outflows: River Camac
- Basin countries: Ireland
- Surface area: 122,079 m^{2} (1,314,050 sq ft)

The Brittas Ponds, sometimes now Brittas Pond (Irish: Locháin an Bhriotáis), also known as Brittas Reservoir, Brittas Lake(s), Glenaraneen Lake or Glenaraneen Mill Ponds, are a pair of artificial lakes (or the upper of the two), situated north of the village of Brittas in the far south of the traditional County Dublin, near the County Wicklow border, in Ireland. They are in the jurisdiction of South Dublin County Council. From inception, the ponds were fed from the River Camac, returning water to it downstream. The southern pond is fully watered as of 2023, while the northern has partly dried into a marshy area.

The millpond is a designated protected structure.

== History ==
The pond structure was brought into existence due to the need for huge amounts of fresh water to service the Swiftbrook Paper Mills in Saggart village, approximately 4 kilometres downstream, and three other mills, including one at Clondalkin.

The lands, then known as 'Bog Larkin', were sold by the Dowling family to John McDonnell (the owner of the mills) in 1847. They were naturally marshy, owing to their placement on a watershed between hills, and were subsequently flooded by the opening of a channel from the River Camac, to create a standing body of water.

As described by Mervyn Ennis in his 2016 publication The Story of Swift Brook Papermill, Saggart:

"[The Camac] rises in the mountains of Seechan above Bohernabreena, Co Dublin not far from Saggart. The small stream flows through Ballynascorney by Penny Bog to Aughafarrell where it meets another stream from Butter Hill. The united stream then flows on as the Kilbride Lisheen River and part of their course forms the boundary lines between Wicklow and Kildare. In 1836, John McDonnell and the mill owners had a dam erected across the river at Aughafarrell turning a portion of its waters into an artificial channel. This diverted channel now flowing through Brittas and the commons of Saggart, became known as the Slade Mor".

The object of at least the first (upper or southernmost) pond's creation was to create a space where a good reserve of water for the dry season could be kept, and to increase the water pressure to the level that certain mills downstream required. Prior to flooding, sloping embankments of about 30 feet in height were lined with large granite slabs from nearby Ballyknockan quarry to prevent erosion and flooding in the area and contain and maintain the boundary of the new lakes as levels rose. Turf banks were also used in the damming. The downstream lake was formed as a fish pond. An embankment separated the two ponds, with a canal, overflow and sluice. The southern pond was around 30 acres in size, the northern about 11 acres.

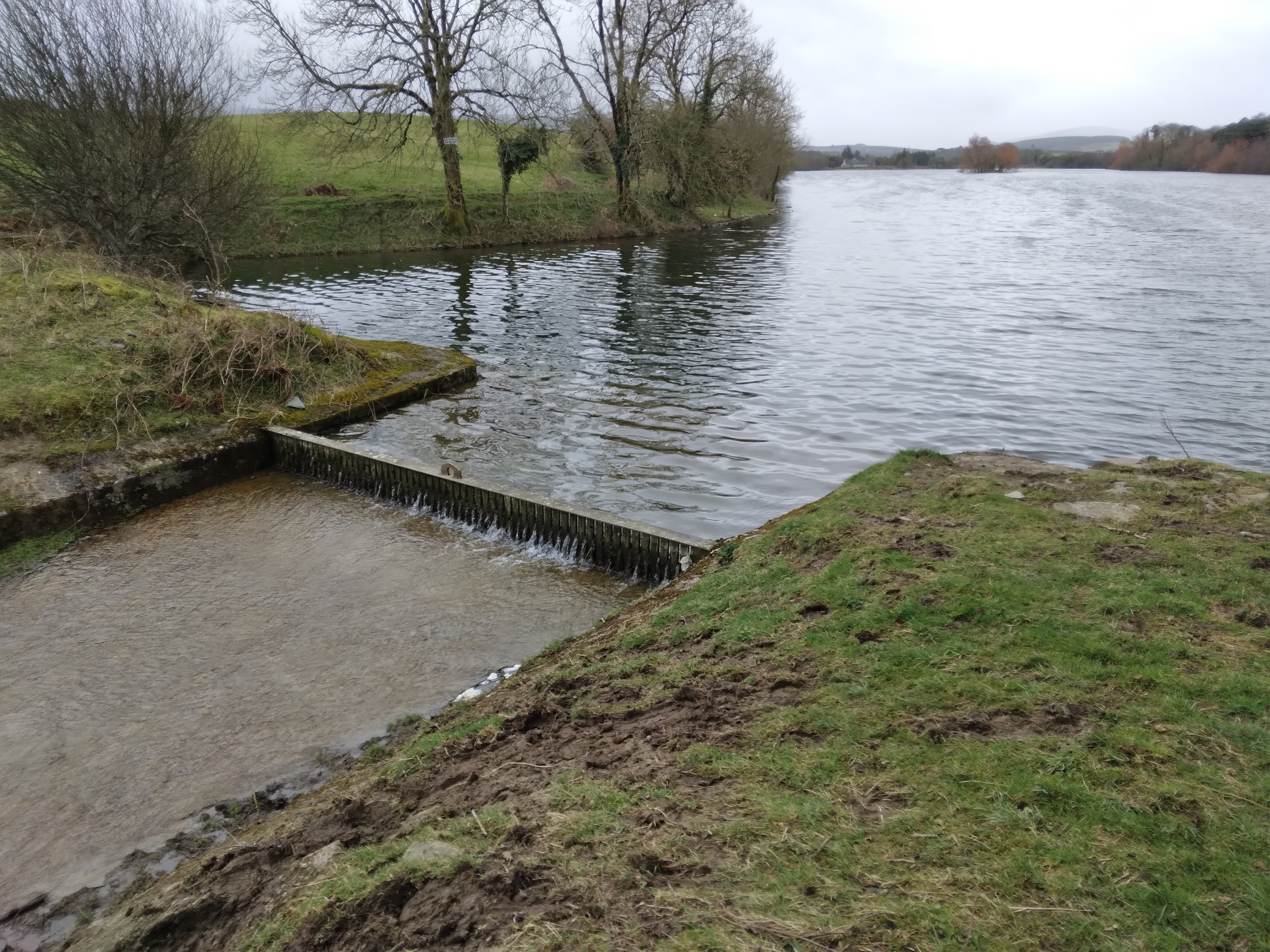
The sluice between the southern and northern pond

The Saggart mills operated from c. 1760 until their closure in 1971, and possessed one of the largest water wheels in Ireland, which required 25,000 gallons of filtered water every hour for the 'washing' process alone. The last mill complex to draw on the Brittas Ponds ceased operation in 1987. The Mansfield Group acquired the Brittas ponds when they bought the site of what was the former Clondalkin Paper Mills for the development of The Mill Shopping Centre.

Having been operational in 1993, by 2002, the northern pond was noted by the National Inventory of Architectural Heritage as being dry, however texts on the rivers of Dublin suggest that it remains damp or swampy, at least at times.

From 1888 until 1932, the Dublin and Blessington Steam Tramway passed by the ponds on their western side. The tram ran on the site of the modern N81 road, which hugs the modern lake and is the main Dublin to West Wicklow road.

=== Angling ===
The Brittas Ponds Fly-Fishing Club was founded in 1881, possibly re-formed in 1903 by Major Gamble, and was still in existence as of 2015. In 1936, the club took a formal lease on the ponds, with exclusive fishing and bird hunting rights. In 1986 the then landowners gave permission for new works by the club, which built a car park and a new boat-house, extended a small harbour and built a net storage hut. The ponds were stocked with trout and perch.

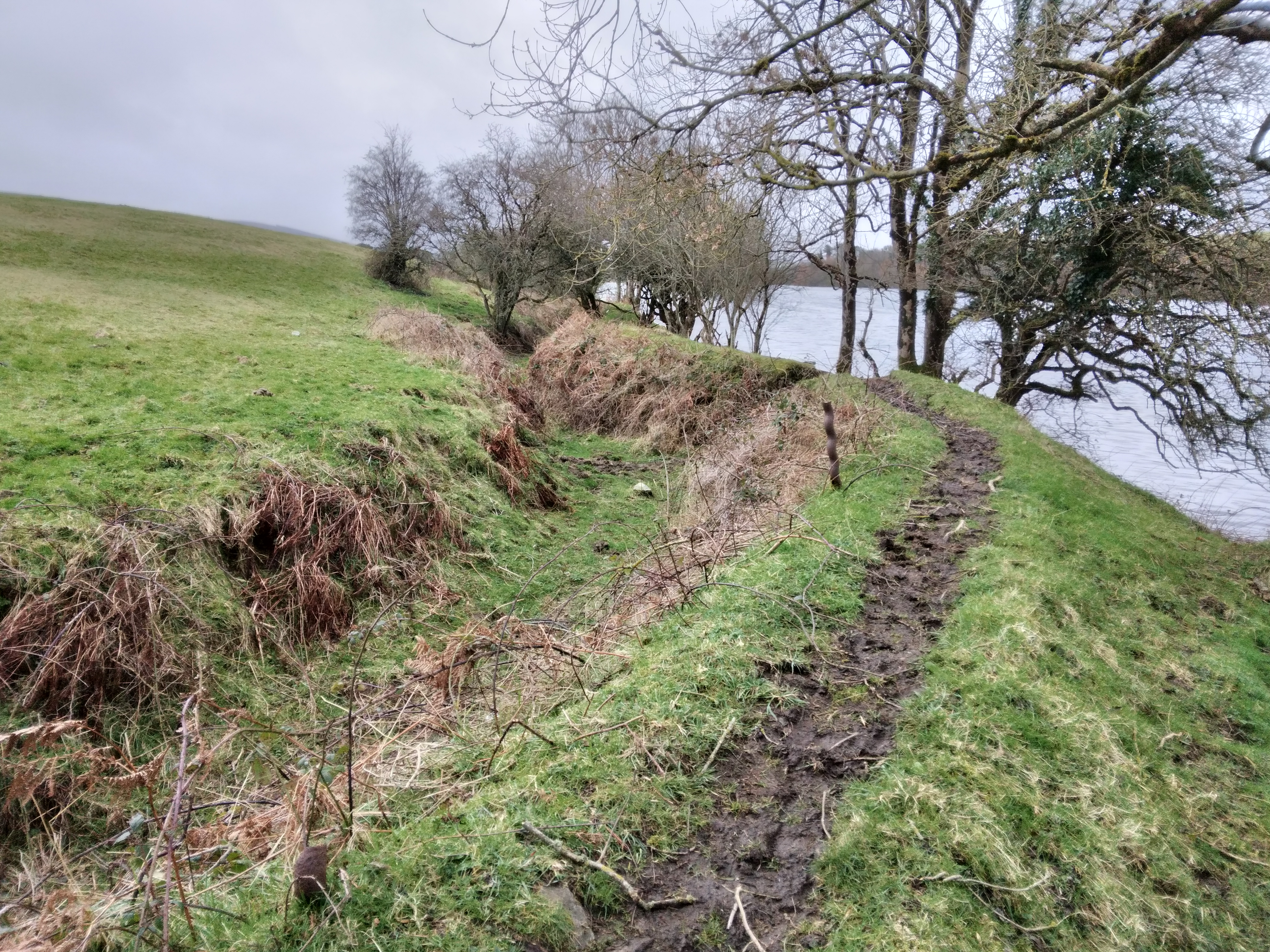
The remains of the separate canal (now dry) through which the Camac flowed to the east of the larger pond

== Crannog ==
There is a mound-shaped island in the pond area, which is generally considered to be a crannog, a site of early settlement commonly found in wet areas of Ireland. While it predates the modern lake formation, the ground was historically marshy, and would have been a potential site for such dwelling places.

In the draft landscape character assessment (LCA) of South Dublin County commissioned in 2021 as part of the South Dublin County Development Plan 2022-2028, it was noted that:

There is just one crannog recorded in the study area, at Glenaraneen, and in fact this is the only crannog in the whole of County Dublin. It is situated in the middle of Brittas Lake. Crannogs are artificial islands, perhaps with palisades, usually originally situated in lakes. They would have been in use at the same time as ringforts, although may have continued in use into later periods and are considered high status monuments.

== Structure ==
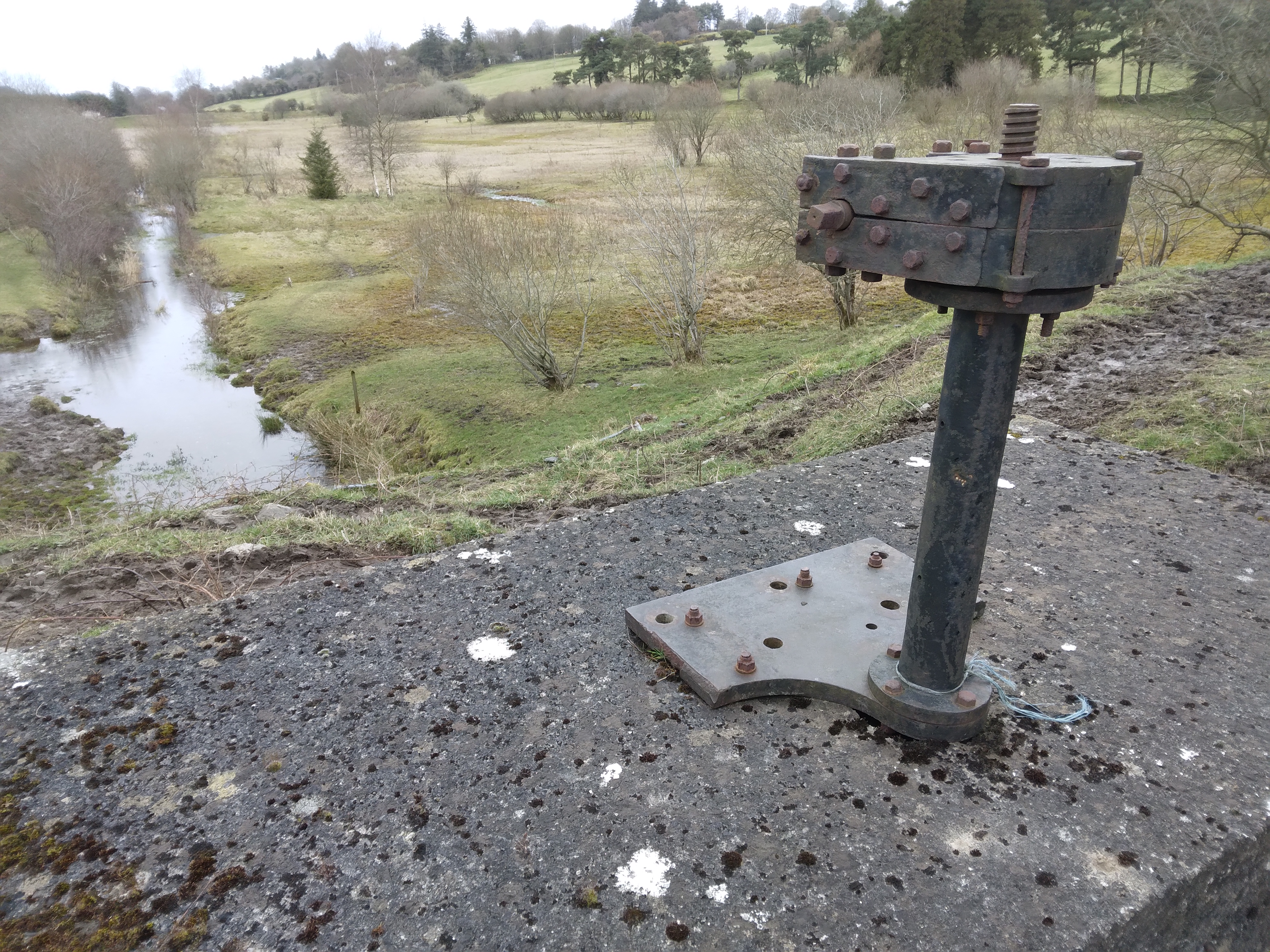
The remains of a mechanism for operating the sluice gate between the two ponds

The pond is fed by an offtake from the River Camac at the southern pond's south-eastern corner, which was historically operated by a sluice gate to regulate the water level; a short canal carried water from the southern to the northern pond. The Camac maintained its course just east of the pond and was rejoined by an outlet flow from the pond area (again controlled by a sluice) a short distance downstream of the northern pond. Although no longer operable, the remains of some of these sluice gates are still in existence. As of 1993, the ponds had a depth of around 20 feet.

Small streams in valleys called Slad na bPlumpog and the Ferny Glinn used to supplement the northern pond, while the White Stone Slade helped feed the northern.

== Flora and fauna ==
The South Dublin County Development Plan 2022-2028 notes that the Brittas ponds "add further ecological interest (in addition to the Slade of Saggart) in the form of a small wetlands that includes freshwater marsh and wet grassland as well as being a wildfowl sanctuary supporting a variety of birds including mallard, teal and tufted duck."

== Future development ==
In 2021, a motion for the development of a leisure and tourism facility at a 100-acre site at the ponds was proposed by current owners, the Mansfield Group.

As of 2015, the heritage office of South Dublin County Council were working on a Slade Valley Heritage Trail which would link the town of Rathcoole with Brittas via the wooded Slade of Saggart and the ponds.

== Sources ==
- Creggan, Michael; Minogue and Associates; Aegis Archaeology; Geoscience Ltd (1 May 2021). "South Dublin County Development Plan 2022-2028. Appendix 9 - Draft Landscape Character Assessment (LCA) of South Dublin County" (PDF).
- Ennis, Mervyn (2016). The Story of Swift Brook Papermill, Saggart. Dublin: South Dublin County Council.
- Weafer, Paul (2015). Brittas Village & Townslands - A Rural View of South Dublin. Dublin: Brittas and Districts Community Association.
