= Bluebell Luas stop =

Tram stop in Dublin, Ireland

Bluebell An Cloigín Gorm
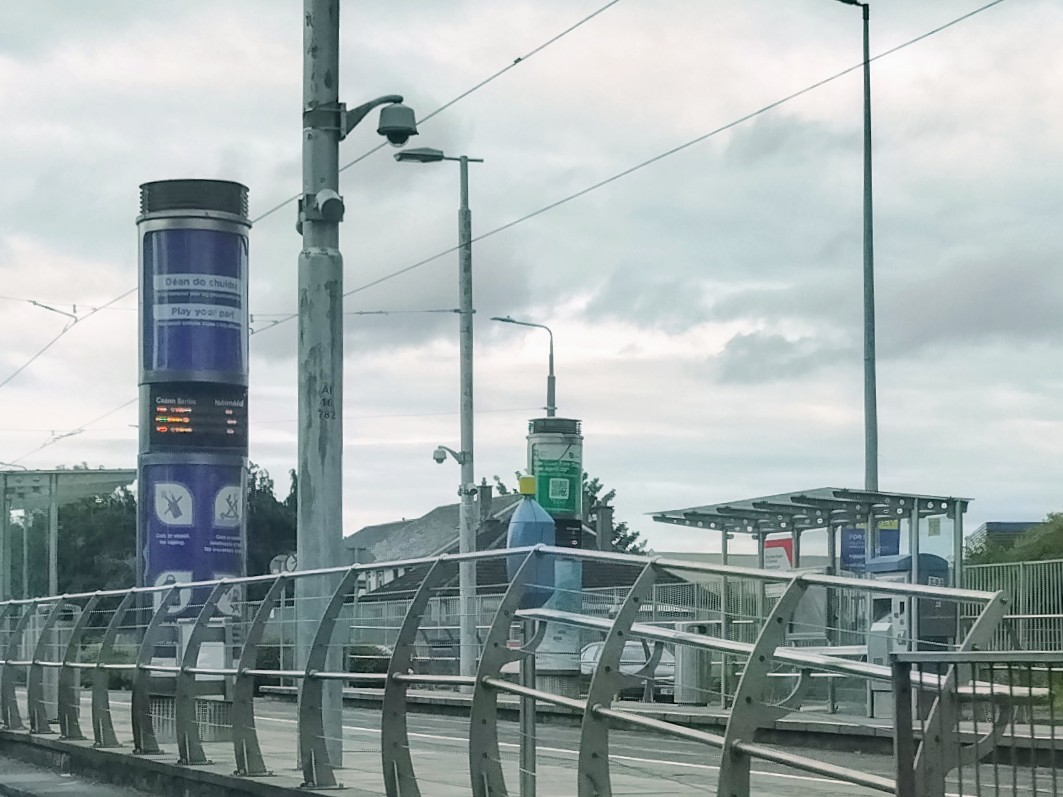

General information
- Location: Dublin; Ireland
- Coordinates: 53°19′46″N 6°20′02″W
- Owner: Transport Infrastructure Ireland
- Operator: Luas
- Line: Red
- Platforms: 2
- Bus routes: 3
- Bus operators: Dublin Bus
- Connections: 13; 68; 69

Construction
- Structure type: At-grade

Other information
- Fare zone: Red 3

Key dates
- 26 September 2004: Station opened

Services
Preceding station	Luas	Following station
Kylemore towards Saggart or Tallaght	Red Line	Blackhorse towards The Point or Connolly
Location
- Location within Dublin

Bluebell (Irish: An Cloigín Gorm) is a stop on the Luas light-rail tram system in Dublin, Ireland. It opened in 2004 as a stop on the Red Line. The stop is located on a section of reserved track in a wide central reservation on the Naas Road dual carriageway in the Bluebell area of Dublin. It provides access to Drimnagh Castle and Lansdowne Valley Park. The stop is also served by Dublin Bus routes 13, 68, and 69.
