= Grattan Crescent Park =

Public park in Dublin, Ireland

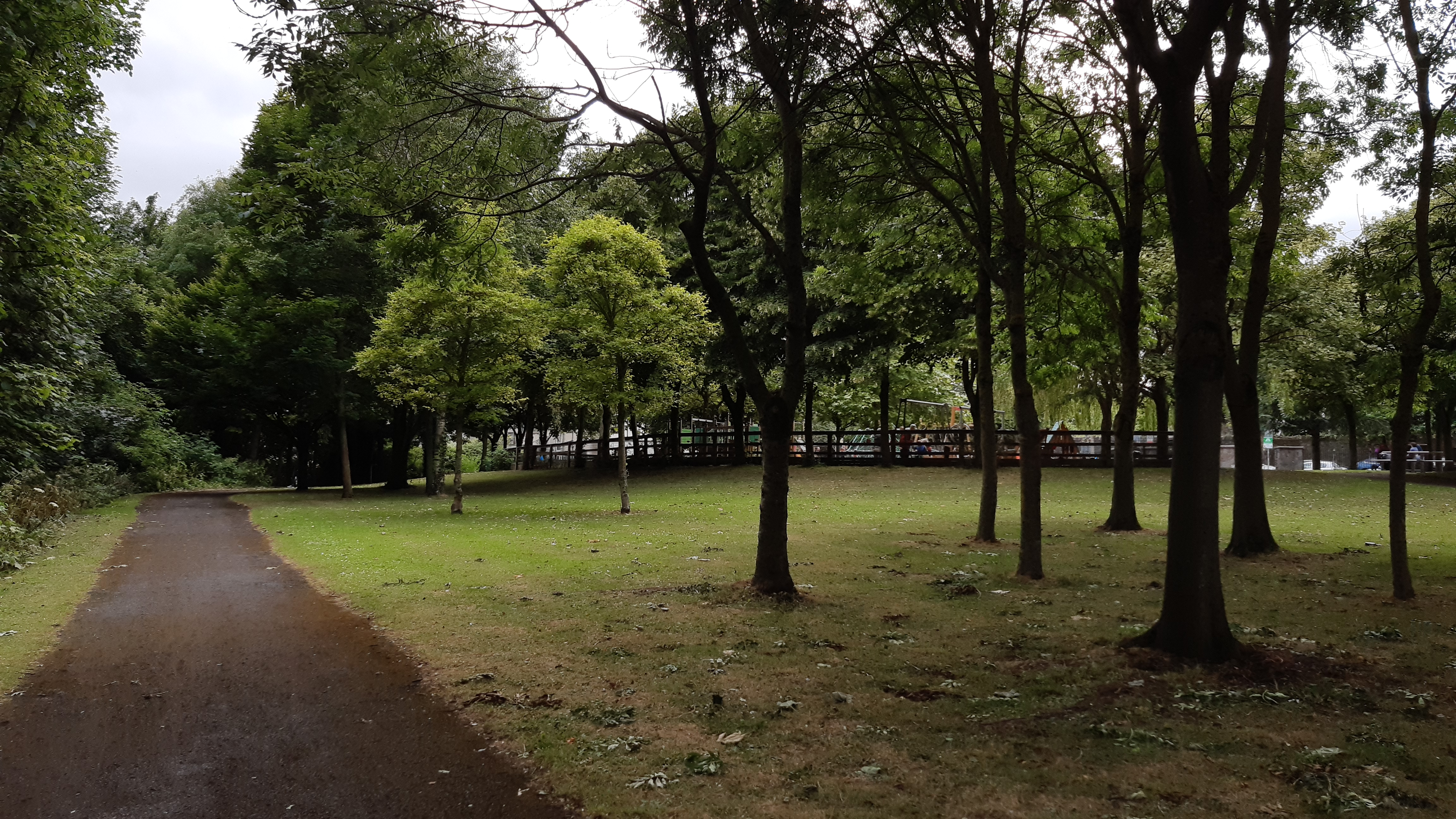
- The park in June 2024

- Location within Dublin Location within Ireland
- Type: Municipal
- Location: Grattan Crescent, Kilmainham, Dublin, Ireland
- Coordinates: 53.3428°N 6.2714°W
- Area: 2.366 acres (0.96 ha)
- Operator: Dublin City Council
- Open: all year
- Website: www.dublincity.ie/residential/parks/dublin-city-parks/visit-park/grattan-crescent-park

Grattan Crescent Park (Irish: Páirc Corrán Grattan) is a public park located between the suburbs of Kilmainham and Inchicore in Dublin, Ireland. The park is bounded by Grattan Crescent road to the west and the River Camac to the east. The park closes at different times of day during the year, dependent on the hours of dusk.

== History ==
Originally used as a mill pond (as per an early 20th century Ordnance Survey map) to serve the nearby Kilmainham Mills via a mill race, the site was later repurposed as a park for public use. Like adjacent Grattan Crescent, the park was named after Irish politician and lawyer Henry Grattan (1746-1820) who campaigned for legislative freedom for the Irish Parliament in the late 18th century from Britain.

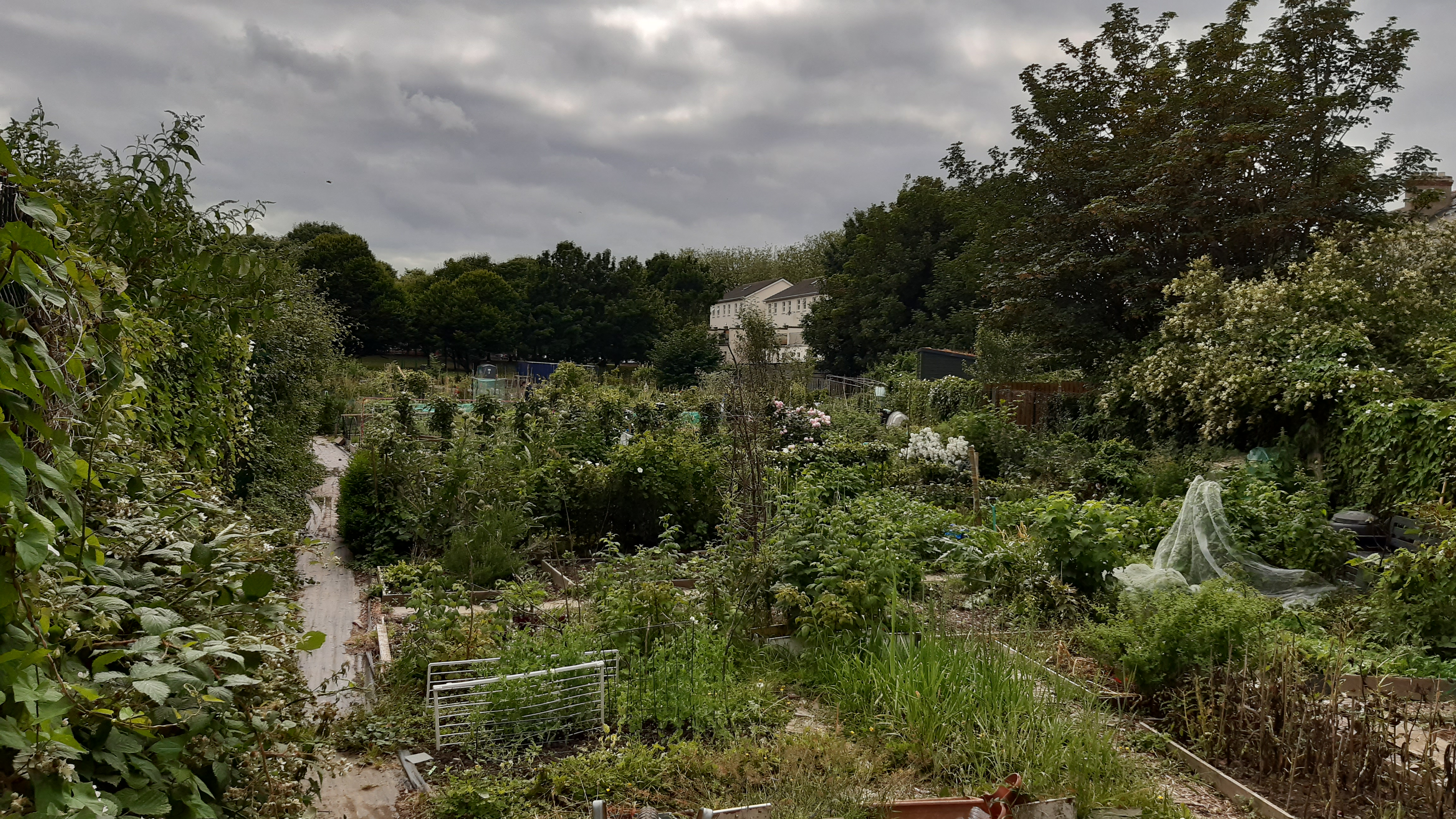
Allotments to the east of the park

In May 2013, Dublin City Council began advertising locally for interested parties to sign up to lease one of 40 allotments which were to be installed on a 1,600 hectare site adjacent to the park next to the River Camac. Allotment holders would each pay a lease of €120 per annum to the council and a refundable key deposit of €50 to access the allotment from the park. In September 2013, Dublin Lord Mayor Oisín Quinn officially opened the Grattan Park Allotment, announcing "This allotment allows local people in Kilmainham and Inchicore to experience the pleasures of growing their own fruit, vegetables and flowers in an urban setting. It also involves locals in improving their communities and gives them greater ownership of it. Allotments are also a great way for young and old to mix and for the wider community to socialize." According to the Dublin InQuirer, as of June 2021, there were 45 people on a waiting list to lease one of the park's (then 48) allotment plots. The allotment area is fronted to the river by a small group of trees, the result of a community grafting initiative named Hard Graft.

In November 2021, Grattan Crescent Park was chosen by Dublin City Council as one of five parks in the Dublin 8 area in which a 5-month pilot scheme known as "Civic Dollars" would be trialled in an effort to encourage outdoor exercise. The scheme allowed visitors to any of the five parks to earn digital currency ("dollars") for every 30 minutes they spent in a park by way of a phone app through which Dublin City Council would track their park use. The dollars could then be used to receive discounts in a number of local businesses.

== Amenities ==
As of 2023, the park contains numerous mature trees, benches, a playground and an allotments area accessible to leaseholders. The playground was closed for approximately seven weeks from Wednesday 18 May 2022 to facilitate improvement works, including the installation of a communications board for non-verbal children with special needs.

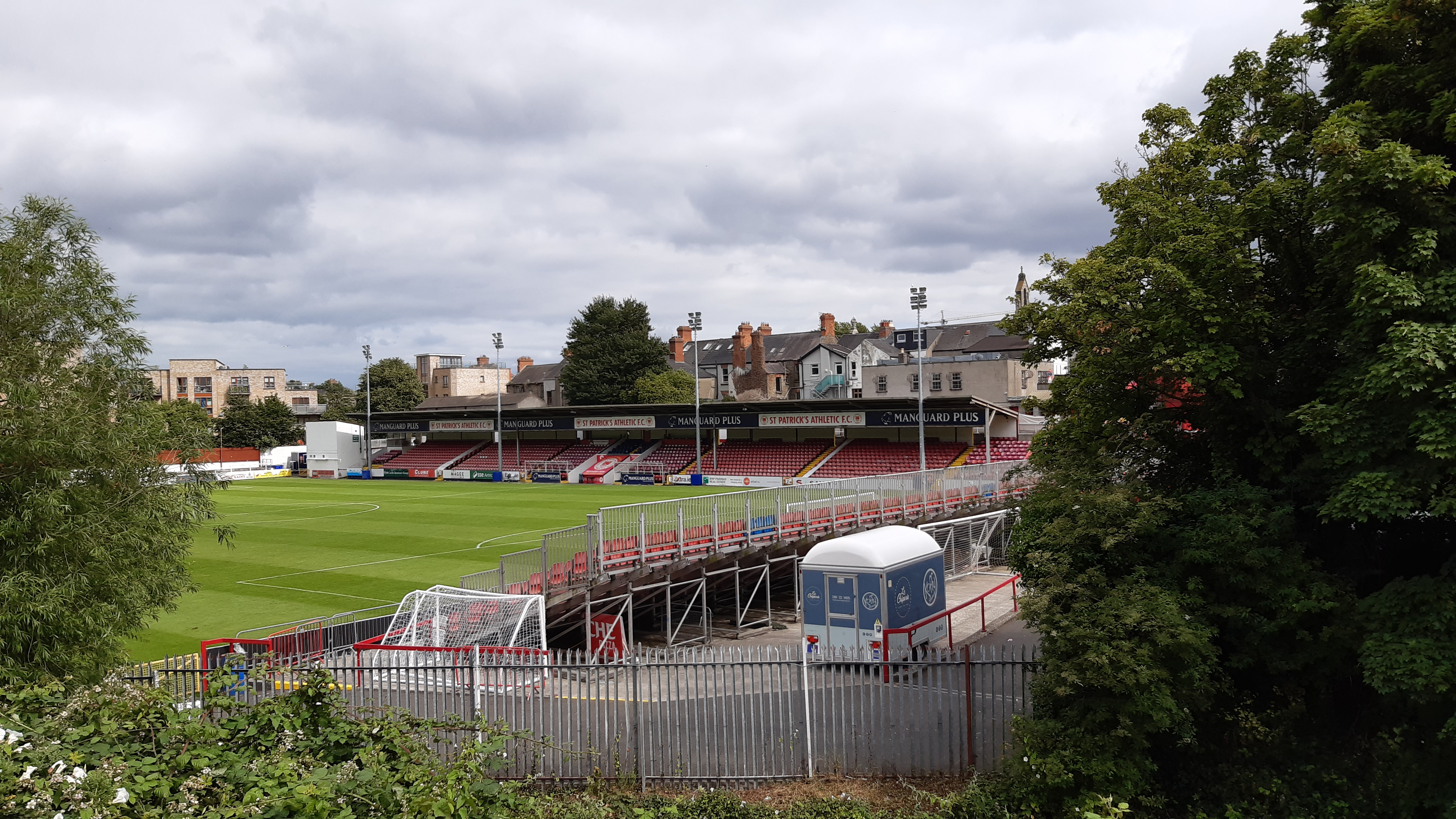
View of Richmond Park across the River Camac from the allotments

The park is situated a short distance upriver of Richmond Park football stadium, the home ground of St Patrick's Athletic F.C.

== Anti-social behaviour ==
In the minutes of a meeting of Dublin City Council's South Central Area Committee in April 2021, it was recorded that, following on from a petition signed by 230 local people, all councillors for the South Central Area were asking that the council's parks department look at Grattan Crescent Park as a matter of urgency to address a number of issues. These included a major increase in anti-social behaviour with syringes being found in the park, rough sleeping occurring in the park, as well as problems with ongoing alcohol consumption. It was also mentioned that the park needed to be cleaned on a regular basis, signs needed replacing, play equipment needed to be checked regularly to ensure it was safe for use, a bin was needed in the playground area to deter littering, and overgrown cow parsley weeds and buddleia next to the River Camac were out of control and needed to be cut back.

Residents requested that an online community consultation process be carried out as a way of influencing future upgrades in the park and as a means of ensuring sustainability.
