= Rathcoole, County Dublin =

Village in County Dublin, Ireland

Rathcoole Ráth Cúil (Irish)
- Village
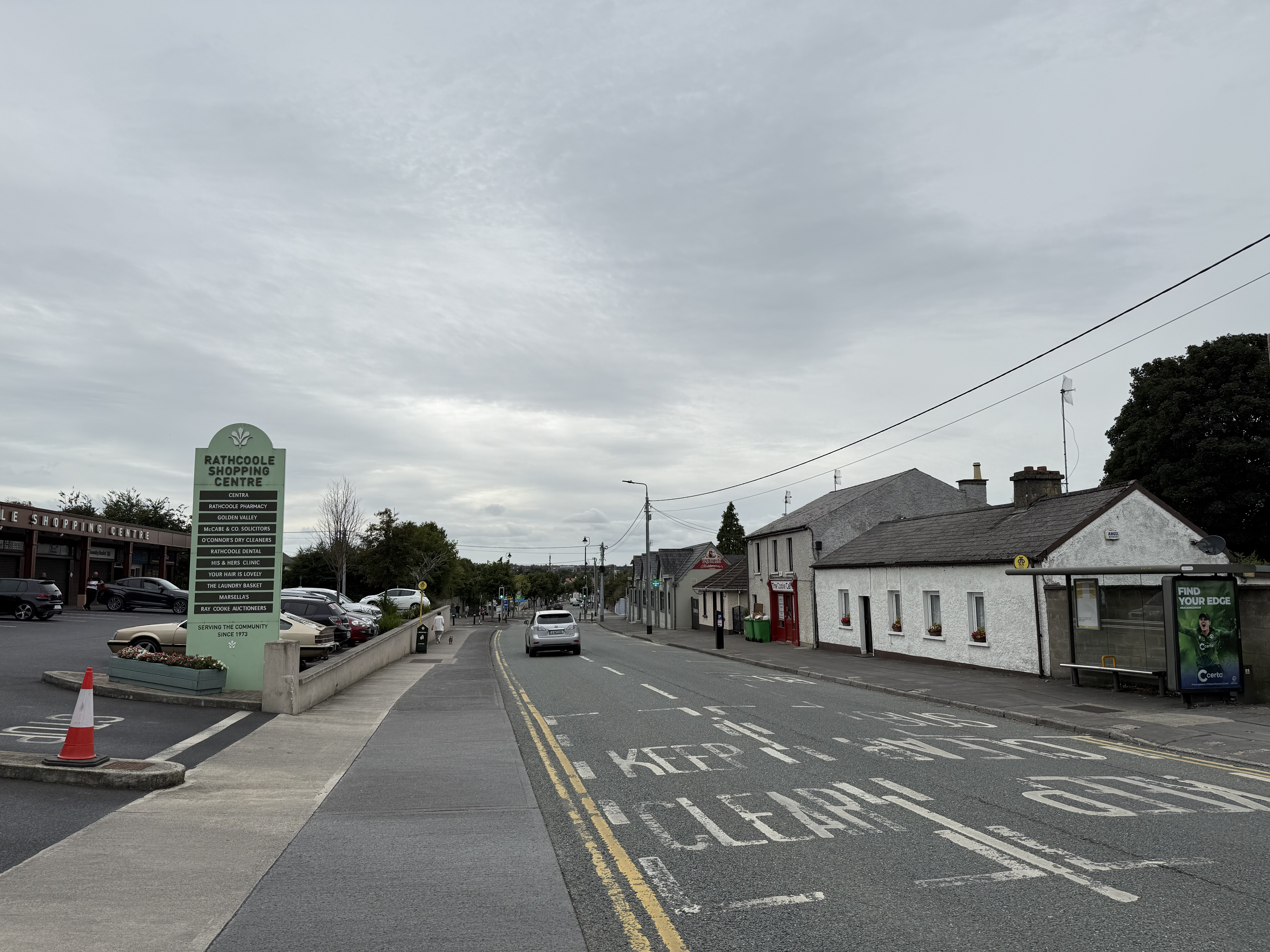
- Main Street

- Location in Ireland
- Coordinates: 53°16′58″N 6°28′22″W
- Country: Ireland
- Province: Leinster
- County: County Dublin
- Local government area: South Dublin

Area
  - Total: 1.1 km^{2} (0.42 sq mi)
- Elevation: 148 m (486 ft)

Population (2022)
  - Total: 5,792
  - Density: 5,300/km^{2} (14,000/sq mi)
- Time zone: UTC+0 (WET)
  - Summer (DST): UTC-1 (IST (WEST))
- Eircode routing key: D24
- Irish Grid Reference: O019268

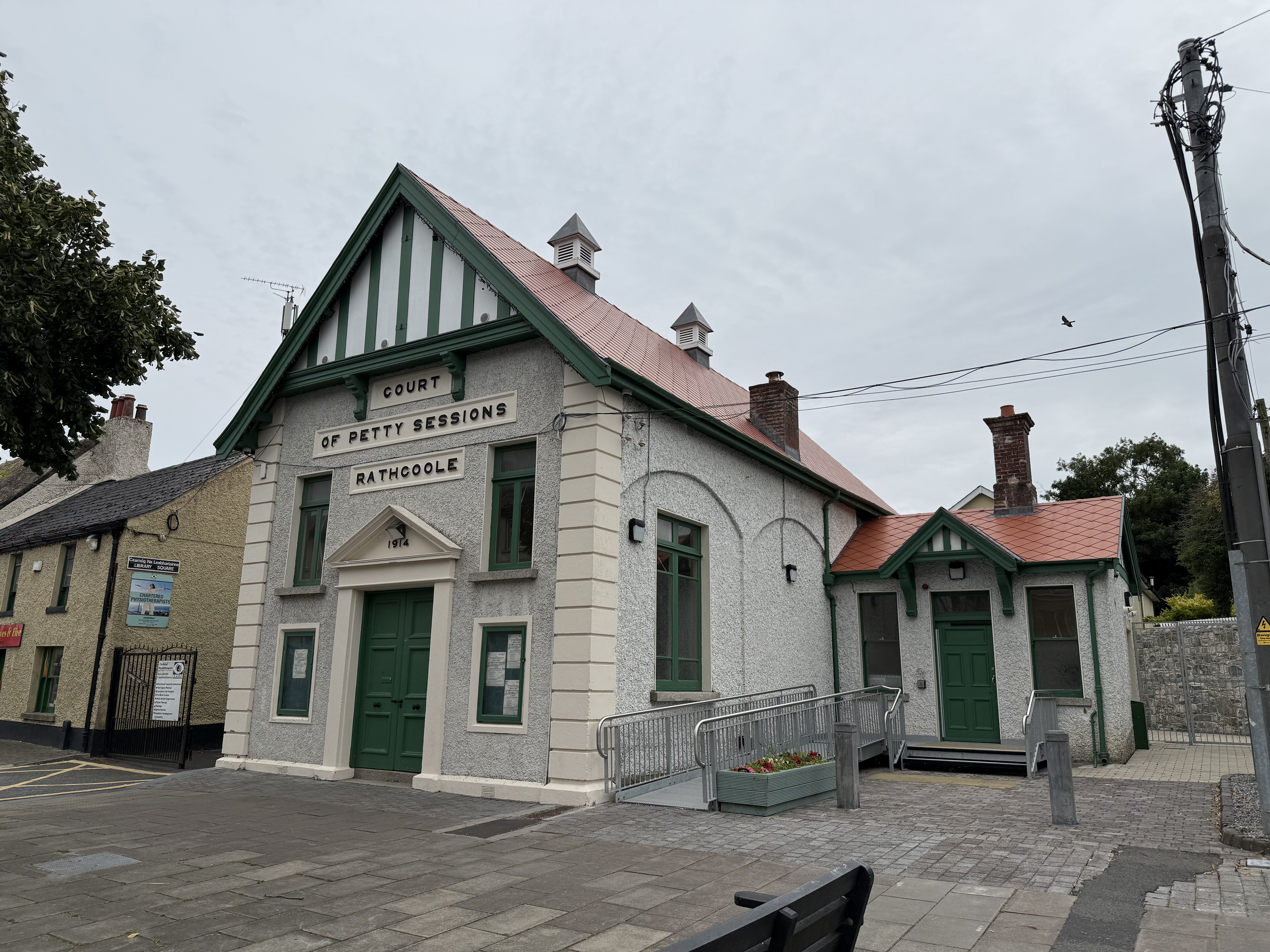
Court of Petty Sessions, Rathcoole

Rathcoole (Irish: Ráth Cúil, meaning 'ringfort of Comhaill or Cumhaill') is an outer suburban village in County Dublin, Ireland, south-west of the city of Dublin, and in the local government area of South Dublin.

Rathcoole is also a civil parish in the historical barony of Newcastle.

== Etymology ==
Ráth is the Irish word for a ringfort, a circular embankment often erected by wealthy farmers or local chiefs. There are several forts in the civil parish of Rathcoole, one of which is in a field between the village and Saggart village. There is no definite explanation for the name "Rathcoole", but it could be Ráth Cumhaill meaning the ringfort of Cumhaill, the father of Fionn mac Cumhaill. Coole may also come from the Irish word for forest, coill.

== Geography ==
Rathcoole lies in the southwest corner of County Dublin, just off the N7 national primary road, southwest of Citywest and west of Saggart village. Close by to the north are Baldonnel and Casement Aerodrome, home of the Irish Air Corps. Also in this part of the county are Newcastle and, further away, Brittas.

Around Rathcoole are several streams, primarily draining the western end to the Griffeen River but south of the eastern end linking to the River Camac, both tributaries of the River Liffey.

Aside from the village core, the area has several housing developments.

== History ==
Like neighbouring Saggart and nearby Newcastle, Rathcoole was on the periphery of the Pale and was the site of many battles with mountain-based rebels, particularly the Byrnes and O'Tooles.

The village had a licence to hold a trading fair three times a year, a tradition that lapsed in the 19th century.

Rathcoole was the birthplace in 1765 of the United Irishman Felix Rourke, and another local, a member of the Clinch family of Rathcoole House, was executed after the 1798 rebellion.

In the late 18th century, Rathcoole was composed mainly of mud huts, and as late as the early 20th century it consisted of only one street.

=== Mercer's Charter School ===
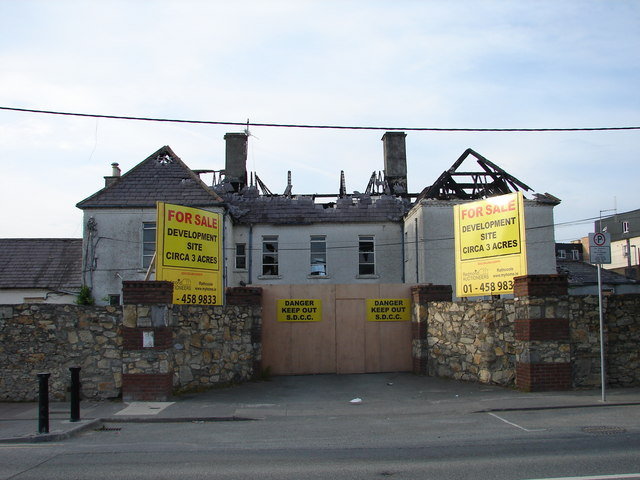
Fire damaged former Mercer's Charter School in the village photographed in 2008.

In 1743-45, a new charter school was constructed in the village with the funds from the endowment of Mary Mercer. The school had earlier been located at Mercer's Hospital from the 1720s but this site had later been deemed an unsuitable location to house the girls. The school operated until 1826 when it closed and moved to Castleknock to take over the former Morgan Trust school and merged into The King's Hospital school in 1970. The building was later used as a glebe house for over a century.

As of October 2024, the building is still standing but has been badly damaged by fire.

=== Rathcoole House ===
Rathcoole is home to Rathcoole House, which was part of a wider estate. The house was built in 1750 and initially belonged to the Clinch family, later passing to the Sheils of Coolmine, who owned it from 1831 to 1962. The house had two main floors above ground and five bays, with a kitchen, milling room and stores in the basement, and a hall, dining room and drawing room on the ground floor. Part of the house was demolished in 1933 and was bought in 2013 by a private investor. As of 2019, it is a privately owned residence.

== Amenities ==
Rathcoole has a landscaped park, run by South Dublin County Council, at the eastern end of the village. There is also a community centre which hosts local events and training courses.

There is a small supermarket, a bank, a credit union, and two service stations on the N7. One of Rathcoole's best-known pubs is An Poitin Stil, which is built on the site of an original inn dating back to 1649.

A pub existed for many years a short distance outside the town on the Naas Road (now N7) named The Blackchurch Inn. For a number of days in November 2019, this pub was temporarily closed by the Food Safety Authority of Ireland due to high levels of E.coli and coliforms which were found in drinking water and ice samples during an inspection, but re-opened some days later. The pub was closed as of April 2022.

== Transport ==
Rathcoole is served by Dublin Bus route 69 (which runs from here to Dublin city centre) and Go Ahead Ireland route W6 (which runs from Maynooth to The Square, Tallaght via Newcastle and Celbridge). Rathcoole is also served by the Dublin Commuter Service 126 which links Dublin to Naas, Kildare and Rathangan.

Saggart Luas stop is located in nearby Saggart and is one of two western termini for the Luas Red Line, the other being Tallaght.

== Education ==
Holy Family Community School opened in 1981. It is a community school for second-level students from Rathcoole, Clondalkin and Tallaght, Saggart and Brittas.

Rathcoole also has two national schools: Holy Family National School and a Gaelscoil named Scoil Chrónáin.

== Sport ==
The local association football (soccer) club is Rathcoole Football Club. Commercials Hurling Club, a Gaelic Athletic Association (GAA) club, is located just off the Naas Road. The local basketball club is Rathcoole Rockets.

Coolmine Equestrian Centre was established in the area in 1989. It provides horse riding lessons and guided horseback trips. The centre became an "equestrian academy" and is known locally as CEAD-Ireland. The academy hosts festivals and other events during the summer.

== People ==
- Bill Attley, Irish trade unionist and football referee
- Darragh Ennis, a chaser on ITV's The Chase
- Dermot Kennedy, singer-songwriter
- Paddy Reilly, folk singer and guitarist
- Michelle Smith who won three gold medals and a bronze medal at the 1996 Summer Olympic Games in Atlanta
- Pat Taaffe, Irish national hunt jockey

== Representation ==
Rathcoole is in the Dáil constituency of Dublin Mid-West and in the local electoral area of Clondalkin for election to South Dublin County Council (the local electoral area also covers an area including Clondalkin, Newcastle and Saggart).

== Twinning ==
- École-Valentin, France - twinned since 14 April 2000.

== See also ==
- List of towns and villages in Ireland
