= Kylemore Luas stop =

Tram stop in Dublin, Ireland

Kylemore An Choill Mhóir
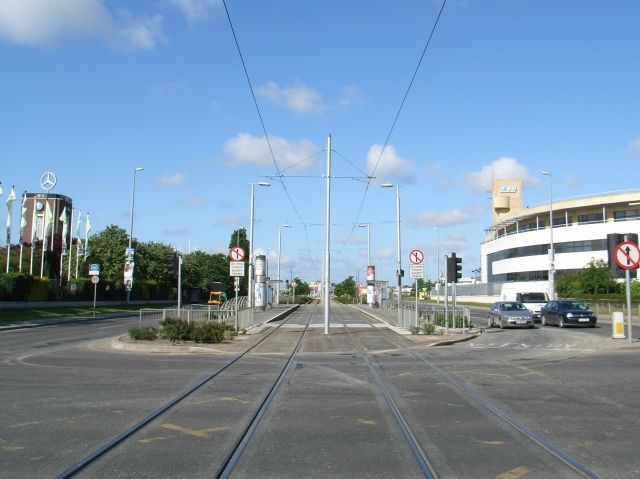
- Kylemore Luas Stop

General information
- Location: Dublin; Ireland
- Coordinates: 53.3267°N 6.3434°W
- Owner: Transport Infrastructure Ireland
- Operator: Luas
- Line: Red
- Platforms: 2
- Bus routes: 11
- Bus operators: Dublin Bus, Go-Ahead Ireland
- Connections: 13; 68; 69; 126; 126A; 126D; 126T; 126X; 126n; 130; S4

Construction
- Structure type: At-grade

Other information
- Fare zone: Red 3

Key dates
- 26 September 2004: Station opened

Services
Preceding station	Luas	Following station
Red Cow towards Saggart or Tallaght	Red Line	Bluebell towards The Point or Connolly
Location
- Location within Dublin

Kylemore (Irish: An Choill Mhóir) is a stop on the Luas light-rail tram system in Dublin, Ireland. It opened in 2004 as a stop on the Red Line. The stop is located on a section of reserved track in a wide central reservation on the Naas Road dual carriageway near the intersection with Kylemore road, and is virtually identical to Bluebell Luas stop. It provides access to Walkinstown, St James Gaels GAA and Kylemore College.
