= Bluebell, Dublin =

Suburb of Dublin, Ireland

Bluebell An Cloigín Gorm (Irish)
- Suburb
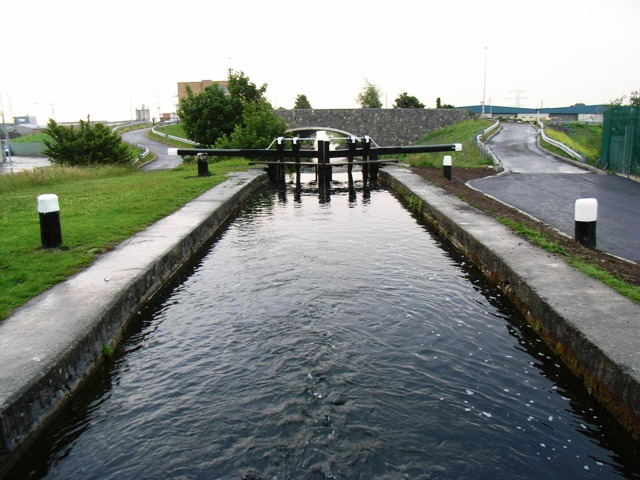
- Seventh lock on the Grand Canal in Bluebell, Dublin 12

- Location in Dublin
- Coordinates: 53.329°N 6.355°W
- Country: Ireland
- Province: Leinster
- County: County Dublin
- Dáil Éireann: Dublin South-Central
- Elevation: 40 m (130 ft)
- Eircode routing key: D12
- Irish Grid Reference: O104328

Bluebell (Irish: An Cloigín Gorm) is a townland and small suburb of Dublin, Ireland. Situated approximately 6 kilometres south-west of the city centre, on the River Camac, a tributary of the River Liffey, the area borders the Grand Canal and Ballyfermot to the west, Walkinstown and Drimnagh to the east, Inchicore to the north, and Clondalkin to the south.

Bluebell is located near the start of the Naas dual carriageway and also borders the Grand Canal. It is within the Dáil constituency of Dublin South-Central and is administered by Dublin City Council at the local government level. Its postal code is Dublin 12.

== History ==
Among the earliest records of the area include references to a church at Bluebell, built c. 1254, when the people who lived here were most likely connected to the Barnewall family's Drimnagh Castle estate. Bluebell Cemetery contains the remains of this ruined 13th-century church. The earliest identifiable gravestones within the cemetery itself date to the early 18th century. The Record of Monuments and Places records the church, graveyard and a nearby bridge. Joseph Traynor (1900-1920) killed on Bloody Sunday in Croke Park, is buried in Bluebell Cemetery.

Bluebell was originally part of the civil parish of Clondalkin. Until the 1950s, it was mainly a market garden and farming community on the outskirts of the city. A residential housing development programme, undertaken by Dublin Corporation in the 1950s and 1960s, brought an influx of families to the area. Our Lady of the Wayside, a large red-bricked Catholic church, was completed to serve the growing population in 1968.

Historical industry in the area included several paper mills which used the River Camac for their water supply. During the 20th century, companies which operated in the area included Lambs, Roadstone, Nugget, McInerneys, Fiat and Volkswagen. The Volkswagen plant, dating from the 1950s, is included in the Record of Protected Structures maintained by Dublin City Council.

== Amenities ==
The local An Post post office is located on La Touche Road. The local church, Our Lady of the Wayside, is within the Catholic parish of Bluebell in the Roman Catholic Archdiocese of Dublin. The church is located on the Old Naas Road, and the Bluebell Luas stop is nearby.

The 91st Dublin Scout Group (Scouting Ireland) serves both Bluebell and the neighbouring suburb of Inchicore and meets in the Oblates Fathers facility in Inchicore. Bluebell has one pub, the Cottage Inn, located on Bluebell Avenue. There are no supermarkets or major shopping centres. Small traders include newsagents, hairdressers and fast food outlets, concentrated on the Old Naas Road near the church.

One primary school, Our Lady of the Wayside, is located on Bluebell Road. The school was opened in 1960. St Cillian's National School is also located in the area.

In 2008, local artist and horticulturalist Fiann Ó Nualláin begun a project, titled 'Bluebells for Bluebell', to encourage locals to plant the flower associated with the area's placename. Supported by the Railway Procurement Agency and Dublin City Council, the project saw the planting of native Irish bluebells into green verges and public spaces in the area.

== Administration ==
In administrative terms, Bluebell is in Dublin City Council and in local government elections is part of the Ballyfermot-Drimnagh Ward. Bluebell is in the Dublin South-Central Dáil constituency.

== Notable people ==
- Willie Bermingham, firefighter and activist
- Catherine Byrne, politician
- Paul Byrne, footballer who previously played for Bluebell United
- Brian Warfield, musician with the Irish traditional group The Wolfe Tones, grew up in Bluebell.
