= College For Every Student =

Non-profit organization in the US

CFES Brilliant Pathways (CFES) is a nonprofit organization that raises the academic aspirations and performance of low-income youth so that they can prepare for, gain access to, and succeed in college.

Founded in 1991, the organization has helped more than 100,000 underserved youth in urban and rural schools throughout the United States get to and through college. Targeted students, known as CFES Scholars, are low-income youth, most of whom would be first in their family to pursue higher education. In the last eight years, 95 percent of the CFES Scholars in grade 12 have gone on to college.

Each participating school selects more than 50 CFES Scholars to engage in three core practices that research has shown are effective in helping underserved students take steps toward college success: Pathways to College, Mentoring, and the Essential Skills.

CFES Brilliant Pathways is based in Essex, New York.

== Press coverage ==
- "Gannon Hosts 'College For Every Student' Event". WICU-TV. May 17, 2012.
- "America East Forms Partnership with 'College For Every Student'" (Press release). America East Conference. December 22, 2009.
- Hunkler, Emily (June 3, 2008). "Symposium geared toward helping college grads return to the Adirondacks". Adirondack Daily Enterprise.
- Littlefield, Bill (April 16, 2011). "America East Athletes Mentor Future College Students". Only A Game. National Public Radio.
- "Ernst & Young and College For Every Student (CFES) Join Efforts To Launch College MAP Program". RedOrbit. May 20, 2009.
- Shepard, Katie (May 5, 2012). "College for Every Student". Essex on Lake Champlain.
- Halpin, Barry (November 30, 2011). "Op-Ed: After shaky start, student finds her way". The Advocate. Stamford, Connecticut.
- White, Deanna C. (August 2, 2011). "Ernst & Young mentoring program helps unlikely students navigate the road to college".
- Gardner, Walt (May 4, 2011). "Unsung Heroes for Poor Students". Walt Gardner's Reality Check. Education Week.
