= Brittas, County Dublin =

Rural village in County Dublin, Ireland

Brittas Briotáis (Irish)
- Village
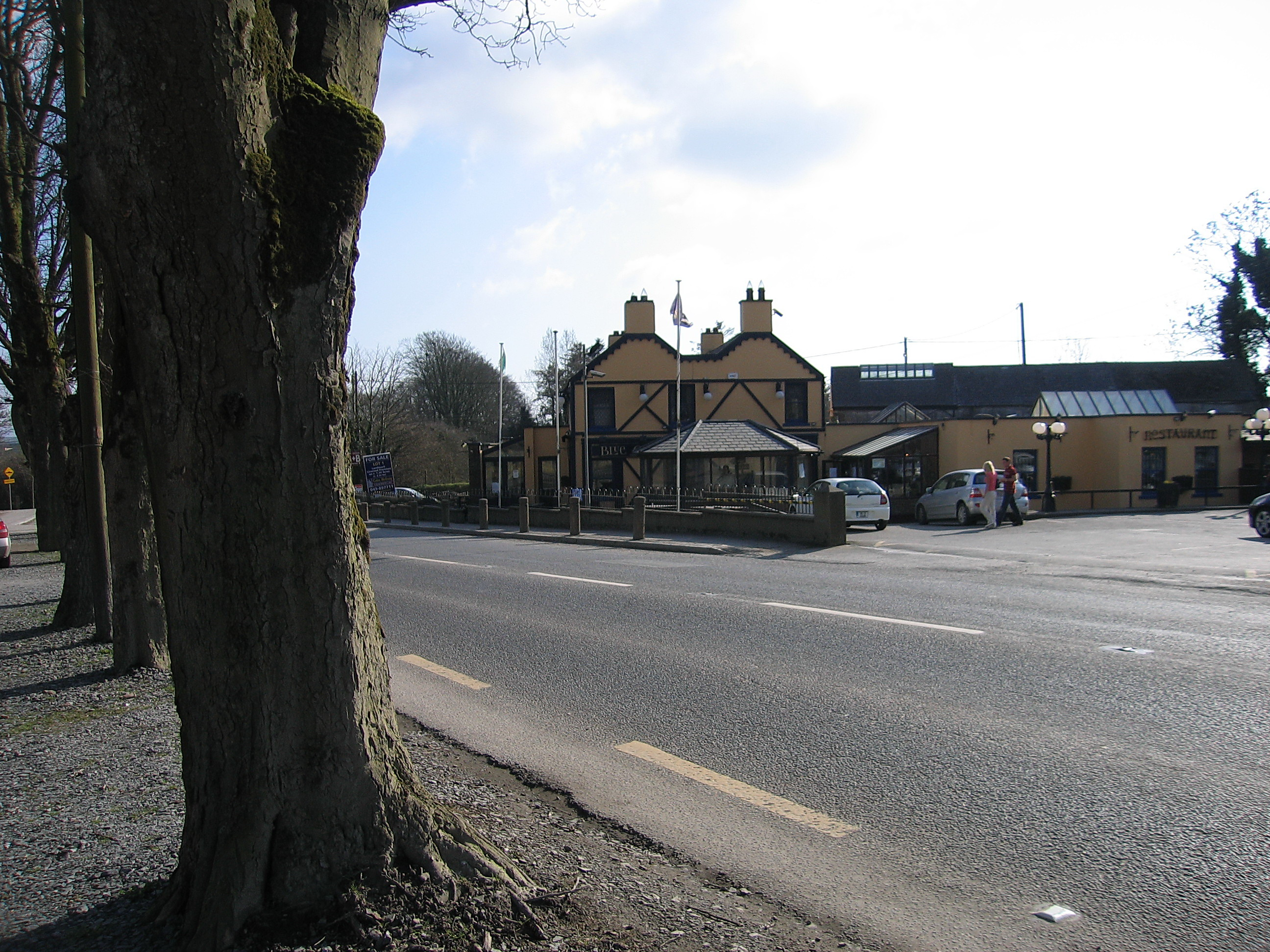
- Brittas, County Dublin

- Location in Ireland
- Coordinates: 53°14′10″N 6°27′15″W
- Country: Ireland
- Province: Leinster
- County: County Dublin
- Local government area: South Dublin

Area
  - Village: 1.7 km^{2} (0.66 sq mi)

Population (2022)
  - Urban: 166

Brittas (Irish: Briotáis, meaning "wooden parapet") is a rural village in County Dublin, just north of the border with County Wicklow on the N81 road. It is in the local government area of South Dublin. The village is notable for five sycamore tree-stump carvings by the side of the road depicting Irish mythological figures carved in 2018.

The River Camac originates close to Brittas before descending through the Slade of Saggart to Saggart and beyond.

== Location ==
Brittas is in the foothills of the Dublin Mountains, 18 km south-west of Dublin city centre (21 km by road).

== Representation ==
Brittas is in the Dáil constituency of Dublin Mid-West, and the local electoral area of Clondalkin for elections to South Dublin County Council.

== Amenities ==
In the summer of 1876, with almost 30 families facing the future without a local education programme, Fr Michael Barry from Saggart was approached about the possibility of establishing a school in Brittas. In 1881, the house beside the old post office was rented from one Mrs Dowling of The Brittas Inn and a school was founded. On the opening day, 105 children registered, aged between 3 and 15.

The Brittas Ponds Fishing Club was founded on Brittas Pond in 1903 by Major Gamble, and was still in existence as of 2015. The ponds first came into existence because of the need for huge amounts of fresh water to service the Swiftbrook Papermills in Saggart. The lands which were then called 'Bog Larkin' were sold by the Dowling family in 1847 and the lands flooded to create the ponds. It is believed that one of the last remaining Bronze Age crannogs in Ireland, and only one in County Dublin, exists within the ponds.

== Blue Gardenia pub ==
The village has one pub, trading almost continuously since 1700, named the Blue Gardenia. Originally owned by the Dowlings in the 1840s and known as the Brittas Inn, by the 1900s it was known as Dillon's, before returning to the name the Brittas Inn. When the Dublin and Blessington Steam Tramway was built in 1888, the tram stop was constructed opposite the pub.

The pub, which has a bar and restaurant that seats 70 guests is on a 1.2-acre site, was intended for sale in 2007 at a guide price of €3.5 million but at some point that year the pub was closed down and remained vacant for many years. It was put on the market in 2013, and eventually sold in January 2018, when it was bought by two County Dublin residents who retained its name and vintage charm. In 2021 a planning application was made to convert part of the ground-floor into two apartments but this was refused by the South Dublin County Council. A previous application to the pub was previously made in 2020. As of January 2023 the pub remained closed.

== St. Brigid's Nursing Home, Crooksling ==
St. Brigid's Nursing Home was a facility caring for long-term female residents on a 26-28 acre site just north of Brittas in the townland of Crooksling. A day care centre was also on the site. St. Brigids' was first acquired by the joint hospital board of Dublin County Borough in 1911 under the 1908 Act and was originally opened in June 1911 as the 'Crooksling Sanatorium', for the treatment of patients with tuberculosis. Away from the pollution of the city below, the fresh and pure air of the site was considered beneficial for the treatment of the illness. In 1912, Thomas Francis McNamara was appointed architect to the Dublin Joint Hospital Board and designed many additions to the site including a new day room, doctor's residence, nurses' quarters etc.

By the late 1950s tuberculosis had effectively been eliminated as a major health risk in Ireland, and the site's function gradually changed to that of a nursing home. The site started to be downgraded in the 2010s, with half of its beds closed in the year 2011. In 2016, the HSE declared that St Brigid's Hospital was not fit for purpose and could no longer care for the elderly.

In April 2021 it was revealed that the Crooksling site, valued at approximately €1m, was expected to be on sale by the end of the month, however Minister for Health Stephen Donnelly delayed the sale. In July 2021 it was perceived that the site had been "safeguarded for the foreseeable future".

In February 2024 there was a major fire at the site. On the morning of Sunday 4 February 2024, a fire broke out causing serious damage to the former nursing home. News media suggested it was arson, highlighting that there had been local rumours that the site was intended to accommodate asylum seekers.

== People ==
Former or current residents of the village (or its immediate hinterland) have included:

- Brendan Grace, Irish comedian and singer.
- Daniel O'Donnell, Irish singer, television presenter and philanthropist.
- Frank Patterson, Irish tenor.
- June Rodgers, Irish comedienne and pantomime actress.
- Katherine Zappone, American-Irish Independent politician who served as Minister for Children and Youth Affairs from May 2016 to June 2020.

== See also ==
- List of towns and villages in Ireland

== Sources ==
- Weafer, Paul (2015). Brittas Village & Townslands - A Rural View of South Dublin. Dublin: Brittas and Districts Community Association.
