= River Camac =

River in Dublin, Ireland

Coordinates: 53.3471°N 6.2927°W

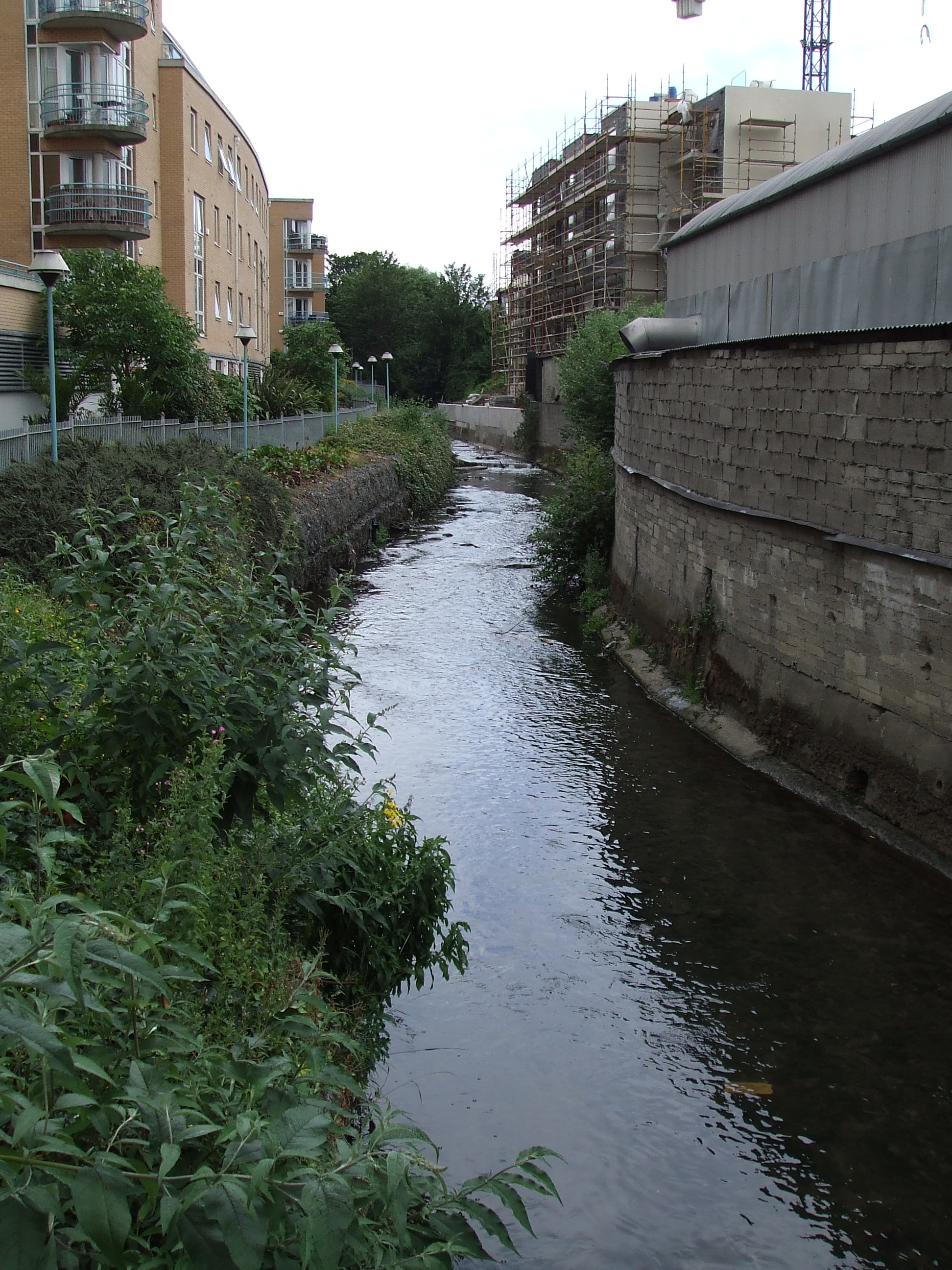
- Camac River looking south at Inchicore by "The Tramyard" development

Location
- Country: Ireland
- Region: Eastern and Midland
- County: South Dublin, Dublin

Physical characteristics
- Source
  - location: Mount Seskin, Slade of Saggart
- Mouth
  - location: River Liffey at Heuston Station, ultimately Dublin Bay

Basin features
- River system: River Liffey
- Tributaries
  - left: Ferny Glinn, the Two Slades, Gallblack Stream (in turn Gallanstown and Blackditch Streams)
  - right: Boherboy Stream (Corbally Slade River), Brownsbarn Stream, Fettercairn Stream, Robinhood Stream (Coolfan River), Drimnagh Castle (or Bluebell) Stream, Walkinstown Stream

The River Camac (sometimes spelled Cammock, or, historically, Cammoge or Cammoke; Irish: An Chamóg or Abhainn na Camóige) is one of the larger rivers in Dublin, Ireland and was one of four tributaries of the Liffey critical to the early development of the city.

== Course ==
The Camac flows from a source on Mount Seskin/Knockannavea mountain northeast of the village of Brittas, County Dublin, joining other mountain streams, before being diverted by an 18th-century diversion from the Brittas River tributary of the River Liffey.

It flows through a mountain valley named the Slade of Saggart which lies just west of the N81 road (and below the site of the Crooksling tuberculosis sanatorium) southwest of the broad Tallaght plain and east of Newcastle. The Slade of Saggart is a large rock-cut valley which was possibly created by fluvioglacial streams deriving from the wasting Slievethoul icecap, as noted by Hoare (1976). The river then flows past Saggart, through Kingswood and under the N7 road. The Camac proceeds through Kilmatead, where there is a small lake with islands, and from there flows into Corkagh Park (formerly Corkagh demesne) where the river was diverted into numerous ponds over the centuries that provided water for local mills. There are two ponds at the back of Kilmateed, a new fishery pond in Corkagh Park, the dry bed of a pond at the back of the Fairview Oil Mill ruins (near Cherrywood), and further downstream next to Moyle Park College, where the water was used by Clondalkin Paper Mills in the past. Many of the concrete ponds are now in poor condition as water levels have dropped and the ponds have silted up. The mill pond serving Leinster Paper Mills was situated on the old Nangor Road, Clondalkin but was covered to make way for a car park and entrance for the Mill Shopping Centre from the Nangor Road side in the late 1980s.

The Camac then flows through Clondalkin village opposite the Garda Station and down Watery Lane, flowing on towards Nangor Road, and meeting tributaries in the industrial Bluebell and Robinhood Estate areas. It then travels through the Lansdowne Valley to residential Drimnagh and Crumlin.

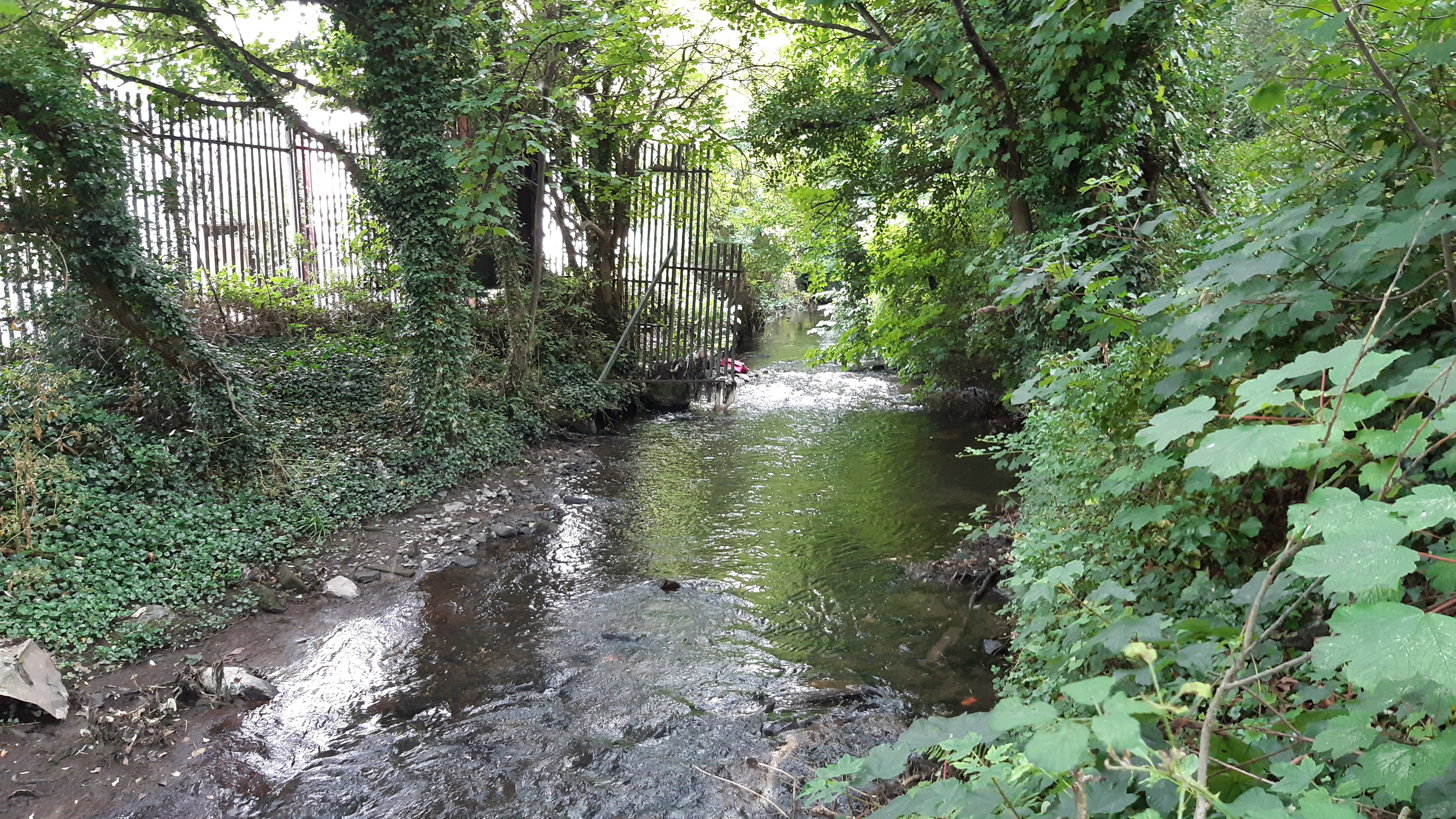
The Camac flowing by the side of Grattan Crescent Park, Inchicore

The river goes on to Inchicore, where it is tunnelled under the Grand Canal before a bridge crossing at Golden Bridge. It runs between Grattan Crescent Park and nearby Richmond Park (home to St Patrick's Athletic football club) where it gives its name to the ground's 'Camac Terrace', and arrives in Kilmainham, where it runs behind the jail museum and is crossed by Bow Bridge at Bow Lane West. It enters the River Liffey alongside Heuston Station, a little upstream of Seán Heuston Bridge. The river was culverted underneath the railway station when it was built in 1846.

=== Tributaries ===
The Camac receives tributaries in the Slade of Saggart, including the Ferny Glinn and the Two Slades, and later from around Newcastle, and near Clondalkin (including the Boherboy, Brownsbarn and Fettercairn Streams, the latter joining near the boundary of Corkagh Park, in which the Camac features). Lower tributaries include the Robinhood Stream (Coolfan River), Gallblack Stream (formed from the Blackditch and Gallanstown Streams), Drimnagh Castle (or Bluebell) Stream, and Walkinstown Stream.

== See also ==
- Brittas Pond
- Kilmainham Mills
- List of rivers of County Dublin
- Rivers of Ireland

=== Bibliography ===
- Doyle, Joseph W. (2011) [2008]. Ten Dozen Waters: The Rivers and Streams of County Dublin (3rd ed.). Dublin, Ireland: Rath Eanna Research. pp. 1–30 + ii + map. ISBN 978-0-9566363-1-7.
- Doyle, Joseph W. (2013) [2008]. Ten Dozen Waters: The Rivers and Streams of County Dublin (8th ed.). Dublin, Ireland: Rath Eanna Research. pp. 1–80 + iv + map. ISBN 978-0-9566363-7-9.
- Sweeney, Clair L. (1991). The Rivers of Dublin. Dublin, Ireland: Dublin Corporation. pp. 1–115, inc. many maps. ISBN 0-9505301-4-X.
