= Saggart =

Village in County Dublin, Ireland

Saggart Teach Sagard (Irish)
- Village
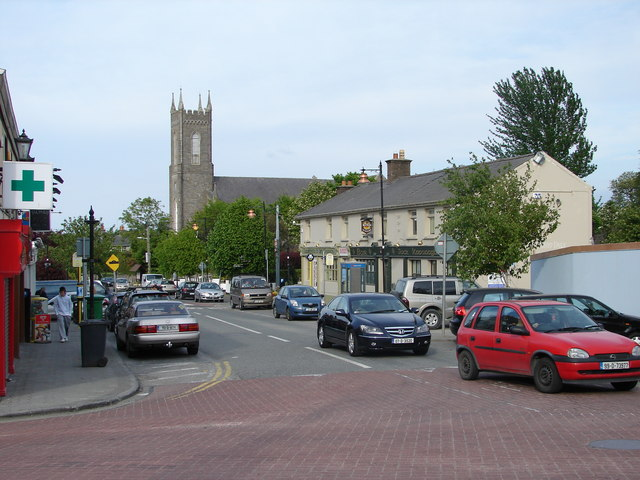
- Saggart's main street

- Location in Ireland
- Coordinates: 53.280°N 6.444°W
- Country: Ireland
- Province: Leinster
- County: County Dublin
- Local government area: South Dublin
- Elevation: 125 m (410 ft)

Population (2022)
  - Total: 4,573
- Eircode routing key: D24
- Irish Grid Reference: O034266

Saggart (Irish: Teach Sagard) is a village in County Dublin, Ireland, south-west of Dublin city, in the local government area of South Dublin. It lies between the N7 (Naas Road), Rathcoole, Citywest and Tallaght. It is one of the fastest-growing settlements in Ireland, with its population doubling between 2011 and 2022. The village is in a townland and civil parish of the same name, in the barony of Newcastle.

== Name ==
A monk called Mosacra founded a settlement close to the site of the village in the 7th century. The name Saggart derives from Teach Sacra, meaning "house of Sacra" in Irish, and the area was known as "Tassagart" for a period.

== History ==
Saggart
Year	Pop.	±%
1991	603	—
1996	550	−8.8%
2002	588	+6.9%
2006	868	+47.6%
2011	2,144	+147.0%
2016	3,133	+46.1%
2022	4,573	+46.0%

Archaeological evidence of ancient settlement in the Saggart area, includes a pair of megalithic standing stones in Boherboy, that are known locally as Adam and Eve. Also nearby is the Raheen Standing Stone, a megalithic standing stone in a field on the Blessington Road, near Crooksling.

A monastery was founded in the area in the 7th century. The remains of this monastery are found on the grounds of an equestrian centre approximately 1.5 km from today's Saggart Village. After its founder, St Mosacra died, it became a nunnery with over 80 nuns living there until the Viking attacks of the 9th century.

By 1207, Saggart, or Tasagart, as it was then called by the Normans, had been made a prebend of St Patrick's Cathedral, Dublin. In 1615, the church was reported as being in good repair but fifteen years later the church is stated to have fallen down, and the Protestant parishioners attended Rathcoole church. The current church at Saggart, the Church of the Nativity of the Blessed Virgin Mary, was built between 1847 and 1849.

From 1888 to 1932, the Dublin and Blessington Steam Tramway stopped at Saggart.

== Nature ==
Saggart lies at the northern end of a mountain valley, the Slade of Saggart, with Brittas at the other side. The River Camac flows through this valley, passing around the village on the way to meet the River Liffey by Heuston Station. The great spotted woodpecker has been seen here.

== Religion ==
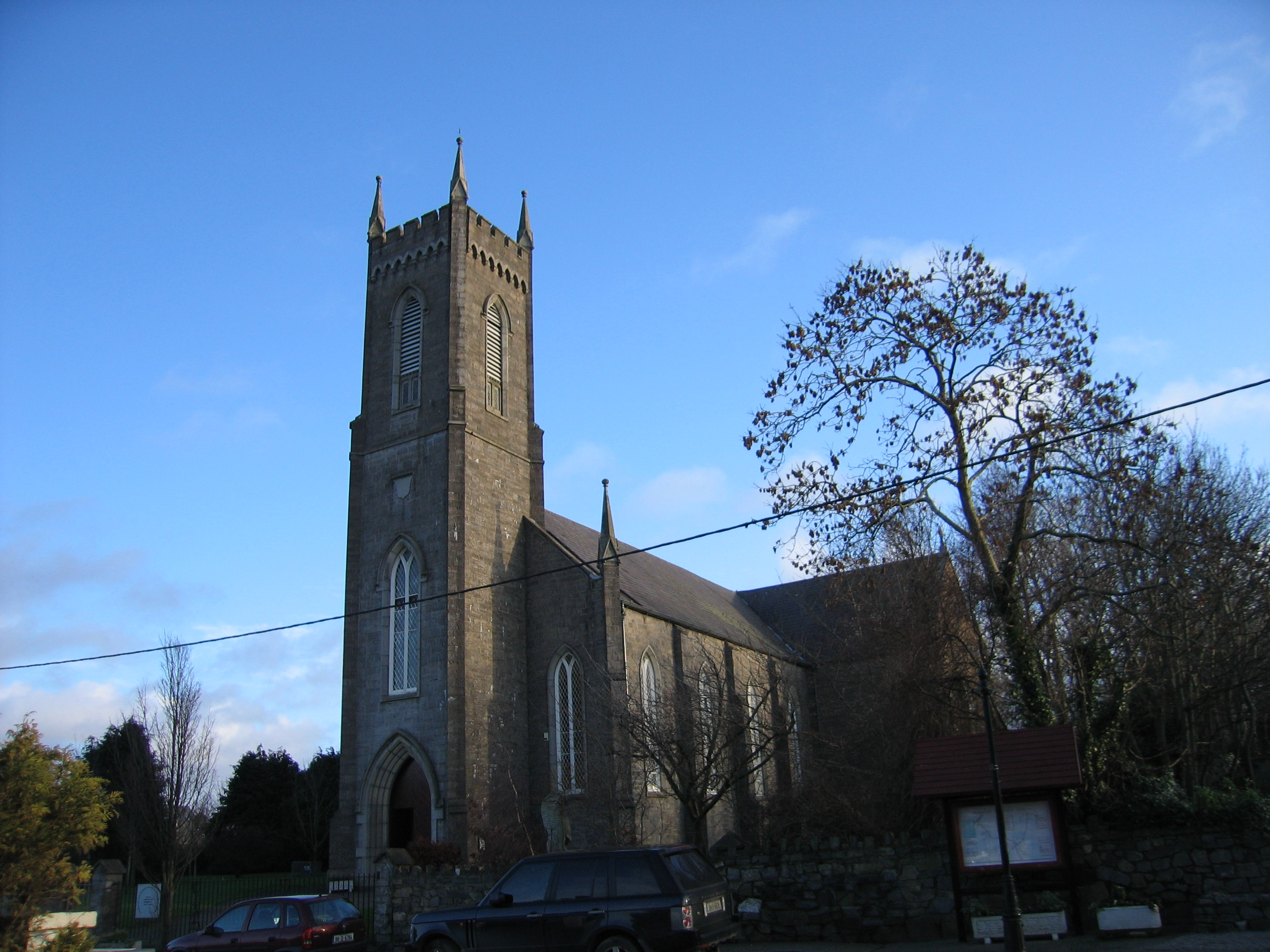
The Catholic church in Saggart was dedicated in August 1849

The boundaries of the Catholic parish of Saggart include the areas of Rathcoole and Brittas, and the parish works in conjunction with the neighbouring parish of St. Finian's, Newcastle. Saggart's parish church was built in 1847 and dedicated, to the "Nativity of the Blessed Virgin Mary", in August 1849. It is within the Roman Catholic Archdiocese of Dublin.

== Amenities ==
Saggart is a heritage village. It is home to the Citywest Hotel, which has been used to host a number of annual events including the Irish Masters (snooker), several award ceremonies, and political ard fheiseanna. Citywest Business Campus is located just to the north of Saggart village. The Citywest Shopping Centre, anchored by Dunnes Stores, is the only major shopping centre in the area and has a pharmacy, cafés and several other shops. There is also a service/petrol station, restaurants and a 4,000-seat convention centre at Citywest. The Citywest Business Campus also includes a Dublin City University facility. Jacob's Bar was established as a public house in the village by members of the Jacob family in 1901.

As of 2021, a section of walking trail, incorporating the Slade Valley and adjacent to Saggart Reservoir, was under construction in the area. The development of the Slade Valley trail was marked as one of the "key actions" under the South Dublin County Council Tourism Strategy 2015-2020, in which it was proposed to take in Rathcoole, Saggart and Brittas.

== Transport ==
Saggart Luas stop is one of two western termini for the Luas Red Line, the other being Tallaght. The line provides a direct link to Dublin city with a journey duration of 45 minutes.

Saggart is served by Dublin Bus route 69 and GoAhead Ireland route W6.

== Sport ==
The local Gaelic Athletic Association (GAA) club, St Mary's GAA, was founded in 1906.

Coolmine Equestrian Centre was established here in 1989. The equestrian centre is home to the remains of the 7th-century monastery of St Mo Sacra. The centre and CEAD-Ireland host equestrian activities and competitions and CEAD-Fest during the summer months.

== Politics ==
For elections to South Dublin County Council, Saggart is part of the local electoral area of Clondalkin, along with Citywest, Rathcoole and Newcastle. Saggart is an electoral division within the Dáil constituency of Dublin Mid-West.

== See also ==
- List of towns and villages in Ireland
