= Kilmainham Mills =

Former mill in Dublin, Ireland

Coordinates: 53.3416°N 6.3066°W

The Kilmainham Mills is a watermill complex used historically as a corn, flour, and woolen mill. It is situated on the River Camac in the Dublin neighbourhood of Kilmainham, Ireland. The mill ceased commercial production in 2000 and has since lain vacant, with proposals to have it converted into apartments, a museum and various other community uses raised but none as yet advancing.

The mill is included on the Record of Protected Structures maintained by Dublin City Council, which purchased it in 2018. As of 2023, remedial works had been carried out by the council to stabilise the mill and associated structures.

== History ==
Milling activity at the site has been recorded for hundreds of years.

In 1973, the mill was purchased by siblings Norrin Kennedy and John O'Loughlin Kennedy, who operated it as The Weavers Shed, an artisanal woolen mill with vertical integration of the entire fabric production process. The Weavers Shed was the subject of an episode of RTÉ's Hands in 1981.

Kilmainham Mill was used as a commercial mill until 2000. It was approved for conversion to apartments in the mid-2000s. This proposed usage was opposed by local groups who hoped that it could be preserved for a cultural use celebrating its industrial heritage, however the apartment project was never commenced and the planning permission ultimately lapsed. The loans associated with the mills were eventually passed to the National Asset Management Agency following the collapse of the Irish property market. Over the following years, the derelict mill buildings became overgrown and degraded significantly, including significant structural damage to timbers and water ingress.

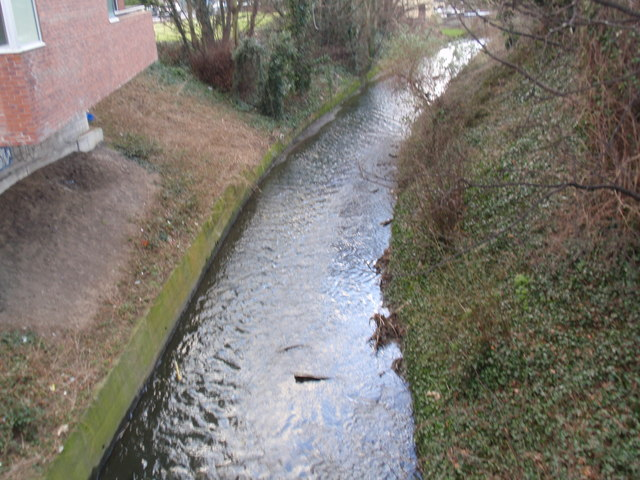
The Camac River, immediately southwest of the mill

The mill was purchased by Dublin City Council in 2018 with the intent of restoring the site for heritage use. Essential repairs were carried out by Dublin City Council in 2023 to make the building safe and accessible, including removal of asbestos. A planning and consultation process to investigate future uses of the site was also carried out. A group named the Save Kilmainham Mill Campaign Group was formed to "encourage Dublin City Council to purchase, preserve and restore" the mill as a public amenity.
