= Lansdowne Valley Park =

Public park in Dublin, Ireland

- Landsdowne Valley Park
- Páirc Ghleann Lansdún
- Location within Dublin Location within Ireland
- Type: Municipal
- Location: Dublin
- OSI/OSNI grid: O 112 324
- Coordinates: 53.331°N 6.329°W
- Area: 7 hectares (17 acres)
- Status: Open all year

Lansdowne Valley Park, or sometimes Landsdowne Valley Park (Irish: Páirc Ghleann Lansdún), is a linear public park in Drimnagh, Dublin. The River Camac flows through it, and it is part of the Green Loop Trail. There is a municipal pitch and putt course in the park.
