= List of submerged places in the Republic of Ireland =

This is a list of submerged places in Ireland. Sometimes, entire villages are submerged under the waters of a reservoir. When the level of waters is low, the structures can emerge and be visible.

== Submerged villages and municipalities ==
A large area of countryside, about 5,000 acres (20 km^{2}), was evacuated to create the Poulaphouca Reservoir in the 1930s and 1940s, including the village of Poulaphouca. 76 houses were also destroyed.

== Submerged landmarks ==
An ancient forest stood in the area between Bray, County Wicklow and Killiney before being submerged by rising sea levels c. 4000 BC. Under the Irish Sea is a "prehistoric palaeolandscape of plains, hills, marshlands and river valleys, in which evidence of human activity is expected to be preserved"; it has been compared to Doggerland in the North Sea.

Lough Nahaltora. County Mayo, contains a submerged forest from c. 2000 BC.

Rosslare Fort was submerged by a storm in 1924–25; a fort had stood on the promontory in Wexford Harbour since the 17th century.

Other submerged sites, according to the National Monuments Service, include "landscapes, harbours, jetties, landing places, fish traps, kelp grids, bridge sites, crannogs and tidal mills."

== Moved landmarks ==
- St. Mark's Cross; formerly located in Burgage More, County Wicklow — this was flooded in the creation of Poulaphouca Reservoir and the cross moved to Blessington
- St. Molua's Church, Killaloe: constructed c. AD 1000 on Friar's Island in the River Shannon, to the south of Killaloe town. In 1929–30 the Shannon hydroelectric scheme raised the water level and submerged Friar's Island, and the church was dismantled and brought north to be constructed on its present site in the grounds of Killaloe Cathedral.
