= KnockanStockan =

Irish independent music festival which existed from 2007 to 2019

- KnockanStockan Independent Music Festival
- Genre: Independent music
- Dates: 26–28 July
- Locations: near Ballyknockan, Blessington, County Wicklow
- Coordinates: 53.12254°N 6.47598°W
- Years active: 2007–2019
- Website: www.knockanstockan.ie

KnockanStockan was an Irish independent music festival established in 2007 and held annually until 2019. In early 2020, the organisers announced that there would be no event that year, making the decision to "end the festival after 13 years". The festival was typically held on farmland overlooking the Blessington Lakes, near Blessington in County Wicklow.

== History ==
2014 lineup poster

In 2007, a musical weekend at The Ballyknockan Inn, with camping facilities available, had 40 acts. Marketed as "A musician’s festival for musicians", this became the basis for KnockanStockan.

The name "KnockanStockan" was chosen as a portmanteau of Ballyknockan and the 1969 festival Woodstock, held in Bethel, New York. Technically, KnockanStockan was held on a site closer to the village of Lacken than Ballyknockan, and even took place on the townland of 'Lackan'.

In 2008, the festival moved to a local farm, and grew to three days and three stages, with over 100 acts, and in 2009, it had over 140 acts. Growth continued in 2010, and Dimestore Recordings and Jack of Diamonds Productions hosted a stage with a number of their acts from their weekly events.

In 2011, the Circus Tent, Fairy Field, family camping, and campervan facilities were added, and local Dublin and Bray bands from the festival formed a 'Busk Mob' in Dublin, singing classic rock hits.

The festival was not held in 2017, but the organisers ran a series of "KnockanStockan presents" events instead. The final festival was held in 2019.

=== Free the Nipple protest ===
On 23 July 2016, concert-goer Carina Fitzpatrick was arrested and escorted off the premises after staging a peaceful Free the Nipple topless protest in which she bared her breasts in the crowd, "doing what most of the men surrounding her were doing - enjoying the concert topless". Fitzpatrick, a jazz singer, noted that the Gardaí "had no notion of asking why I had my top off, because they had already decided that it was out of pure licentiousness", even though what she had simply wanted to express was that "women should be free to dress as they wish without being objectified or sexualised".

According to the Irish Times, other men and women, emboldened by Fitzpatrick's actions, took their tops off and displayed "Free Carina" messages written on their bodies. Festival security put a stop to the female toplessness, but left the men alone. As of 1 August 2016, it was noted that two of the women who had taken their tops off had been arrested, placed in handcuffs and were awaiting court dates.

Afterwards, other women at the festival came up to Fitzpatrick to talk to her about body confidence and feminist issues. Some parents also wanted to thank her, as they believed their children would have "healthier attitudes towards their own bodies and towards women". A Bulgarian woman told Fitzpatrick that going topless was "no big deal" in her country.

The Garda Síochána released the following statement in relation to the incident: "Complaints were made by members of the public at approximately 7.30pm on the 23/07/16 concerning an offence under Section 18 of the Criminal Law Amendment Act, 1935 … i.e. committing public indecency... The offending female was escorted from the event and her name and address were taken. The matter is under investigation."

Speaking to journalist Philip Boucher-Hayes on the RTÉ Radio 1 programme Liveline a few days later on 27 July 2016, Fitzpatrick explained how, on the day in question, the weather had been fine and she had noticed that there were topless men "everywhere", but that women were not afforded the same freedom. "In an age of revenge porn and slut-shaming, where men threaten to humiliate women by posting pictures of their body parts online", Fitzpatrick noted that "the only defence is sexual confidence. We must keep refusing to be threatened by our sexuality but, instead, to own it. Or display it, if we want to. To normalise it".

The protest opened a conversation in Ireland about bodily autonomy for women, with broadsheets the Irish Times and Irish Independent both covering the incident. Fitzpatrick also considered that the "censorship of women at Knockanstockan by the authorities was (for many people) a degradation of the innocence and the freedom of expression that (were) integral to the festival's culture."

In an August 2016 Facebook post shared thousands of times afterwards, Fitzpatrick explained that the aim of her actions was to highlight "the many glaring double standards that are imposed upon women". The Irish Naturist Association, also in a Facebook post, noted that they believed the protest was "just the start of a campaign that if common sense prevails will lead to a more equal society here in Ireland".

== Awards ==
In 2008 KnockanStockan won "Best Small Festival" at the Irish Festival Awards. In 2012, KnockanStockan was shortlisted for the Irish Times "The Ticket" festival awards. Also in 2012, KnockanStockan was nominated for six Irish Festival Awards, including Best Small Festival, Best Line Up and the Social Responsibility Award.
