= Catherine Fulvio =

Irish chef

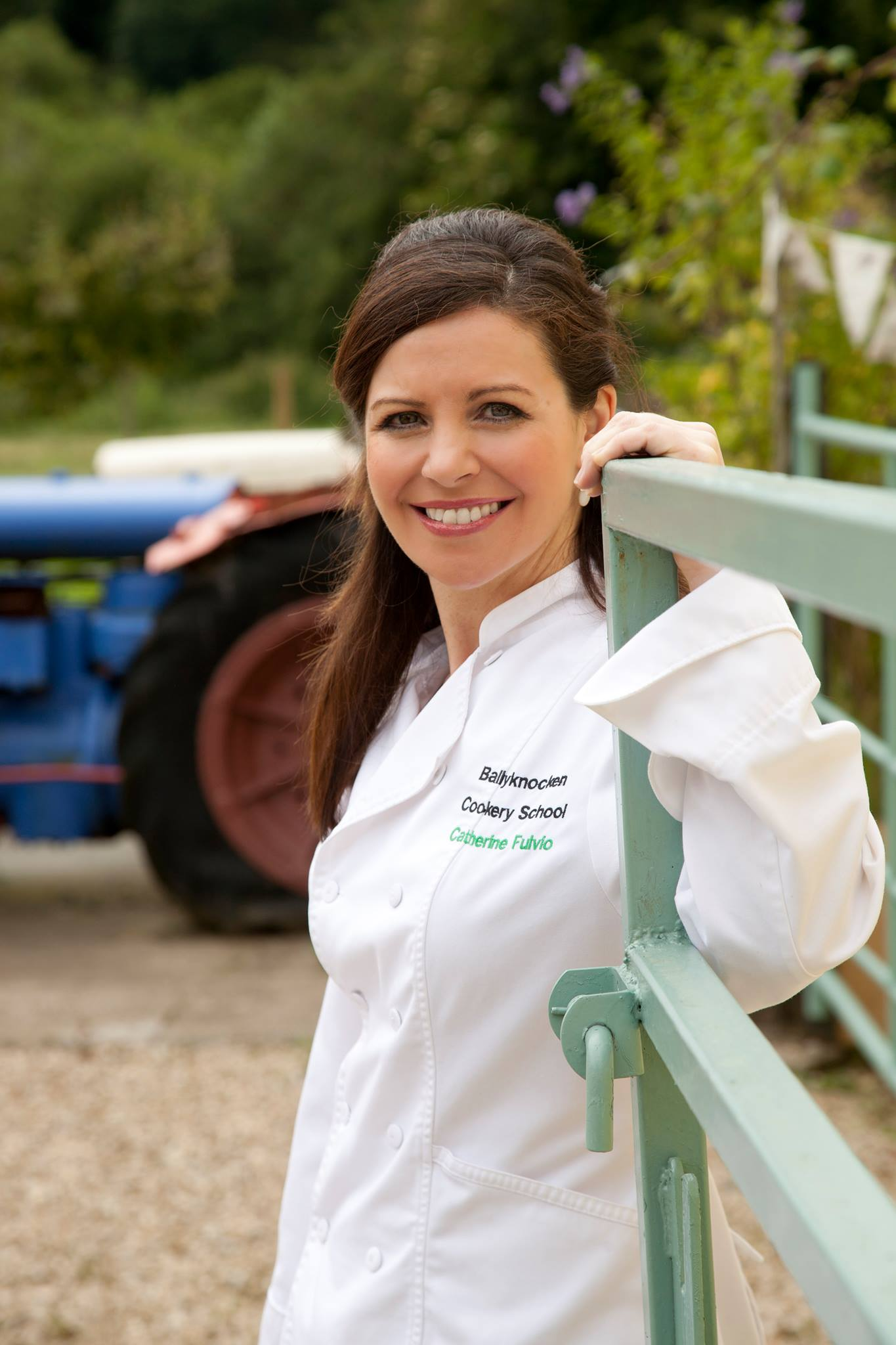
- Born: Catherine Byrne; January 1, 1970 (age 56); Glenealy, County Wicklow, Ireland
- Spouse: Claudio Fulvio (m. 1996)
- Children: 2
- Culinary career
- Awardss
- Gourmand World Cookbook Award; Bord Gais Irish Book Awards 2010
- Website: www.catherinefulvio.com

Catherine Fulvio (née Byrne) is an Irish TV chef, food writer, author, and the owner of Ballyknockan House and Cookery School.

== Early life ==
Fulvio was born and raised at Ballyknockan House in Glenealy, County Wicklow. She and her siblings were raised on a farm at Ballyknockan.

== Career ==
Since 2004 Fulvio has been the principal proprietor of Ballyknockan House Bed & Breakfast, which she later expanded to include Ballyknockan Cookery School. Fulvio is a TV personality in Ireland, the UK, and the US, and has authored multiple cookbooks.

=== TV work ===
Fulvio has been featured on several cooking-related TV shows, both in Ireland and abroad. She was nominated for a Daytime Emmy Award for Outstanding Culinary Host for the US TV series "A Taste of Ireland" on Recipe TV. Fulvio has also featured in other TV shows, including:

- Lords & Ladles – originally on RTÉ, which is on Netflix and Amazon Prime Video.
- Tastes Like Home – RTÉ
- Saturday Kitchen
- BBC A Taste of Success – RTÉ Player
- Catherine Celebrates – RTÉ Catherine's Italian Kitchen
- RTÉ Catherine's Roman Holiday
- RTÉ Catherine's Family Kitchen
- RTÉ The Today Show
- NBC The Best Christmas Food Ever
- BBC iPlayer

=== Writing ===
As of 2021, Fulvio has authored six cookbooks covering various meals and cooking styles, from Italian dishes to baking recipes. Fulvio is also a weekly food columnist for the RTÉ Guide, where she shares weekly recipes.

=== Cookbooks ===
- A Taste of Home
- The Weekend Chef: Easy Food for Lazy Days
- Catherine's Italian Kitche
- Eat Like An Italian: Recipes for the Good Life
- Bake Like An Italian: More Recipes for the Good Life
- Catherine's Family Kitchen

== Personal life ==
Catherine is married to her husband Claudio, of Palermo, Italy. Together they have two children.

After the death of her mother, Fulvio took over the management of the Ballyknocken House Bed & Breakfast, which was a 4-star Victorian-style guesthouse located in Wicklow, 47 km from Dublin. The Ballyknocken Cookery School was opened in 2004 on the grounds of Ballyknocken House.

== Awards and achievements ==
- Tastes Like Home: Best Reality Series, 2021 Taste Awards
- Catherine Fulvio: Entrepreneur of the Year 2013, ActionCOACH
- Bake Like An Italian: Best Italian Cuisine Cookbook 2015, Gourmand Awards
- Eat Like An Italian: Cookbook of the Year 2012, Bord Gais Energy Irish Book Awards
- Ballyknocken Cookery School: Cookery School of the Year 2007, Cordon D’Or Gold Rubbon Culinary Academy Awards
- Catherine's Italian Kitchen: Best Italian Cuisine Cookbook Ireland 2011, Gourmand World Cookbook Awards
- Catherine's Italian Kitchen: Best Television Celebrity Cookbook Ireland 2011, Gourmand World Cookbook Awards
