= R758 road (Ireland) =

Road in Ireland

R758 road
- Bóthar R758
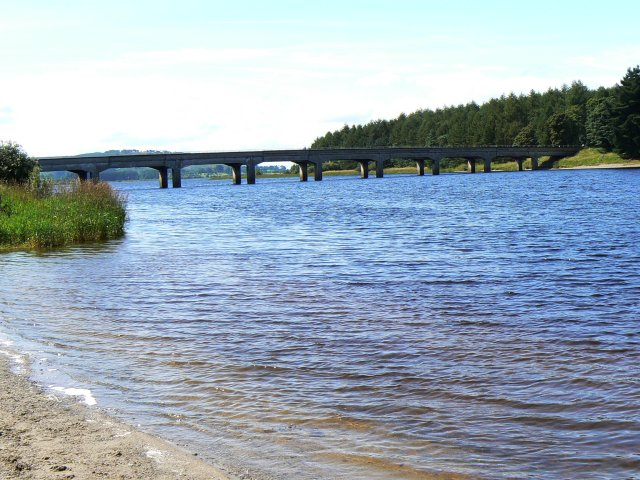
- Baltyboys Bridge carries R758 over Poulaphuca Reservoir

Route information
- Length: 11.8 km (7.3 mi)

Major junctions
- From: R756 at Lockstown, County Wicklow
- To: N81 at Burgage Moyle

Location
- Country: Ireland

Highway system
- Roads in Ireland; Motorways; Primary; Secondary; Regional
← R757	→ R759

The R758 road is a regional road in County Wicklow, Ireland. It connects the R756 to the N81. The road travels through the village of Valleymount and crosses Poulaphouca Reservoir via two bridges. The road is 11.8 kilometres (7.3 mi) long.
