= St. Mark's Cross =

- Ardchros Naomh Marcas (Irish)
- St Baoithin's Cross
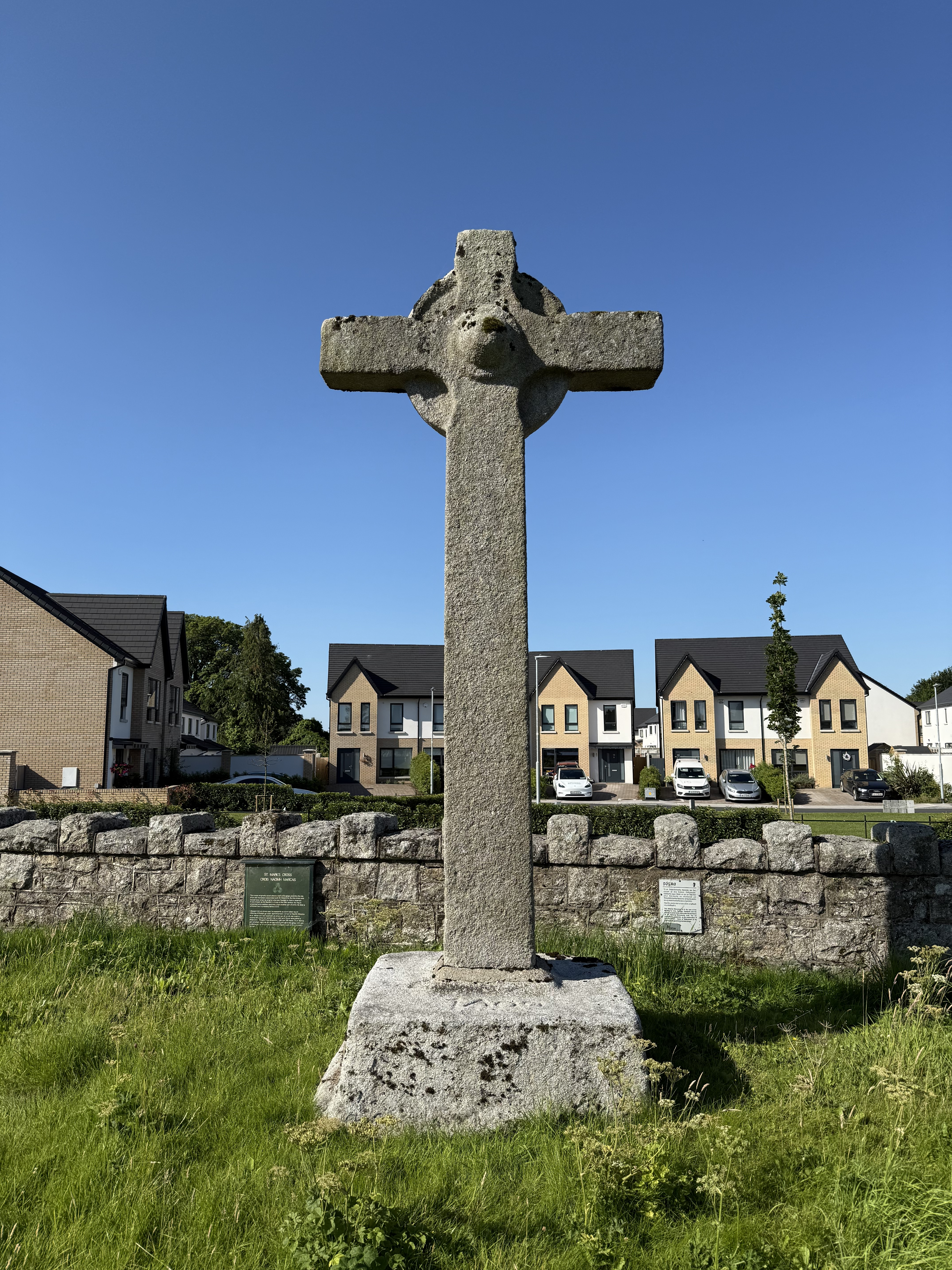

- Location within Ireland
- 53.161499°N 6.54141°W
- Type: High cross
- Location: Burgage More, Blessington, County Wicklow, Ireland

History
- Built: 12th century AD

Site notes
- Height: 4.2 metres (14 ft)
- Area: Liffey Valley

National monument of Ireland
- Official name: St. Mark's Cross
- Reference no.: 280

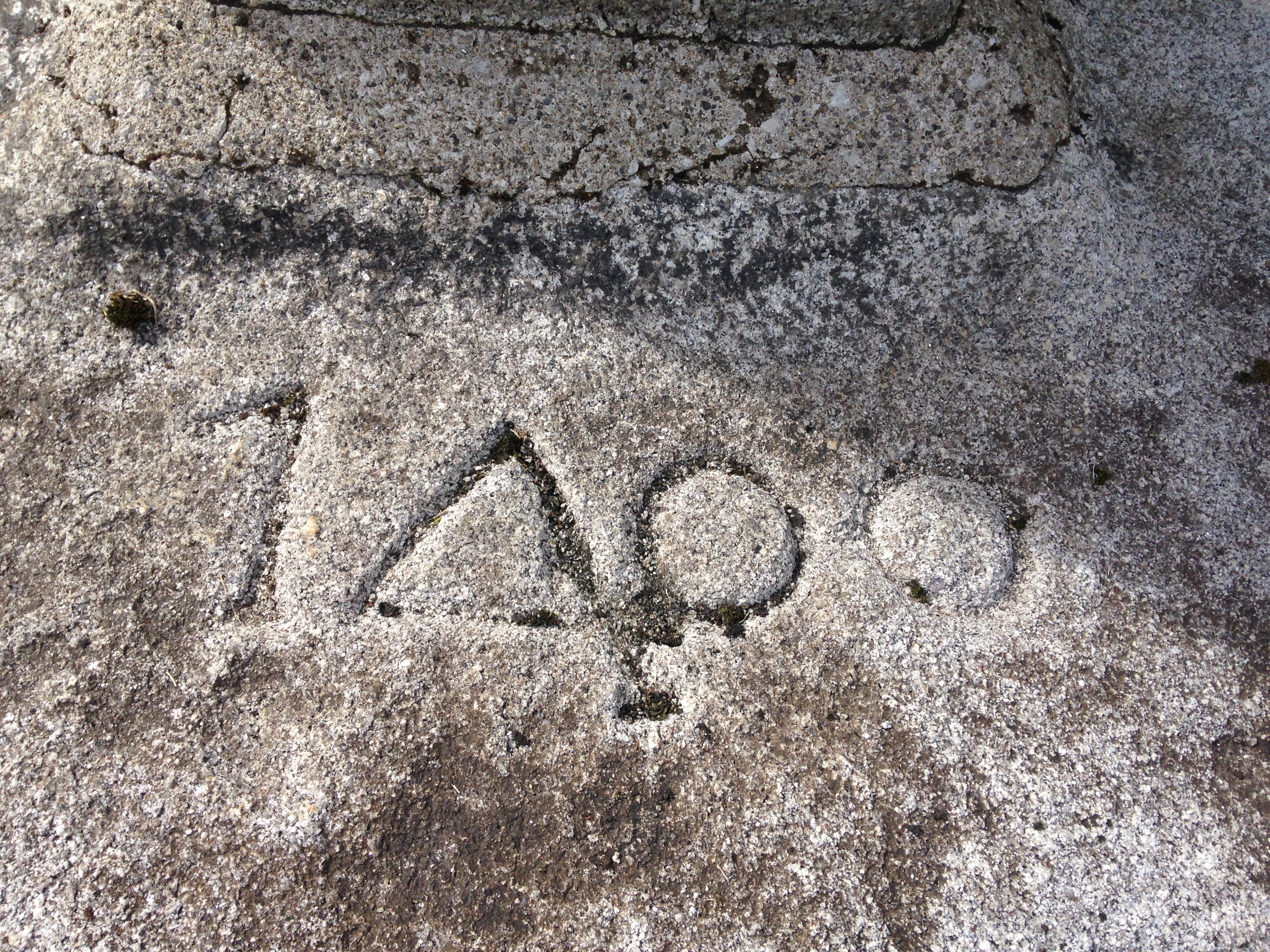
Carving at the base of the cross, reading "1400"

St. Mark's Cross is a high cross and National Monument located in Blessington, County Wicklow, Ireland.

== Location ==
St. Mark's Cross is presently located at the south wall of Burgage cemetery, Blessington, 600 m (660 yd) west of the River Liffey.

== History ==
St. Mark's Cross was erected in the 12th century next to a church and holy well in Burgage More. In the 19th century, it was also known as Saint Baoithin's Cross. The original site was submerged during the creation of Poulaphouca Reservoir, and the cross was moved to Burgage cemetery.

== Description ==
The cross is made of blue-grey granite and stands 4.3 metres (14 ft) high. Like nearby St. Kevin's Cross in Glendalough, St. Mark's Cross was made from a single piece of granite. The cross has an unpierced ring, unlike most Celtic crosses, and unusually long arms. There is a decorative boss in the centre of both faces. On the base of the cross is a weathered inscription.

== See also ==
- A "massive" broken high cross in the townland of Ballintubber, near Blessington.
