= John Lackey (cyclist) =

Irish road racing cyclist and director of the Tour of Ireland

Personal information
- Born: 7th October 1932 Soran, County Longford, Ireland
- Died: 5th November 1990 (aged 58) Blessington, County Wicklow,Ireland

Cycling career
- Sport: Cycling
- Discipline: Road racing
- Role: Rider

Major wins
- 1st in Grand Prix of Ireland (1953)

John Lackey (c. 1933 - November 1990), from County Longford, Ireland, was an Irish road racing cyclist, and later cycle sport administrator and race organiser, holding office at club and national level in Irish cycling for more than 20 years, including more than a decade directing the Tour of Ireland multi-stage road race.

== Life ==
John Lackey came from Soran, between Killoe and Ballinalee, Co. Longford.

=== Racing career ===
Lackey began his cycling career with the St. Mark's club in Dublin, where he had moved for work, in 1951. He started by touring, then pursuing time trials, and then mass-start races, winning his first attempt in that discipline.

He later cycled with Tailteann cycling club, and was for some years its captain.

He won more than 200 races, primarily in Ireland. He won the Grand Prix of Ireland in 1953. In the Tour of Ireland, he finished in 1954 as one of just 15 from a field of 108, was twice third in the general classification, and came second, by only 42 seconds, in 1955, when the tour ended in Longford. Lackey also won the first Tour of Wicklow.

He was selected for and rode in the 1954 Route de France (a 10-day amateur stage race) Irish national team, and the World Road-racing Championships in Denmark in 1956. In 1957 was selected to ride in and captain the all-Ireland team for the World Championships in Belgium.

In 1961 he became the first rider from Ireland to win the Tour of the North (in Northern Ireland).

=== Cycling and race administration ===
Having held various club and Dublin County Board offices, he was elected as massed-start (road racing) secretary of the internationally recognised cycling federation, the CRE, in November 1960, for the 1961 season. He held that role on the C.R.E., and a similar role on the Irish Cycling Federation, executive committees, over several years.

After his racing career, Lackey became a key organiser of stage races in Ireland, including the Tour of Ireland, of which he was director for 14 or more years.

=== Personal life ===
Lackey, a Protestant, was married to Doris Lackey, a former national women's cycling president. He lived his later life in Dublin and near Blessington in Co. Wicklow, and retired as joint Managing Director of Kelly's Builders Providers of Thomas St. Dublin, in early 1990. He died in early November 1990. His funeral was at Cloughlea and his ashes were interred at Glasnevin. His brother William "Bill" Lackey also cycled. A son, Ian, later spent a period as Garda Superintendent for Lackey's home area in Longford.
