= Blessington =

Town in western County Wicklow, Ireland

Blessington Baile Coimín
- Town
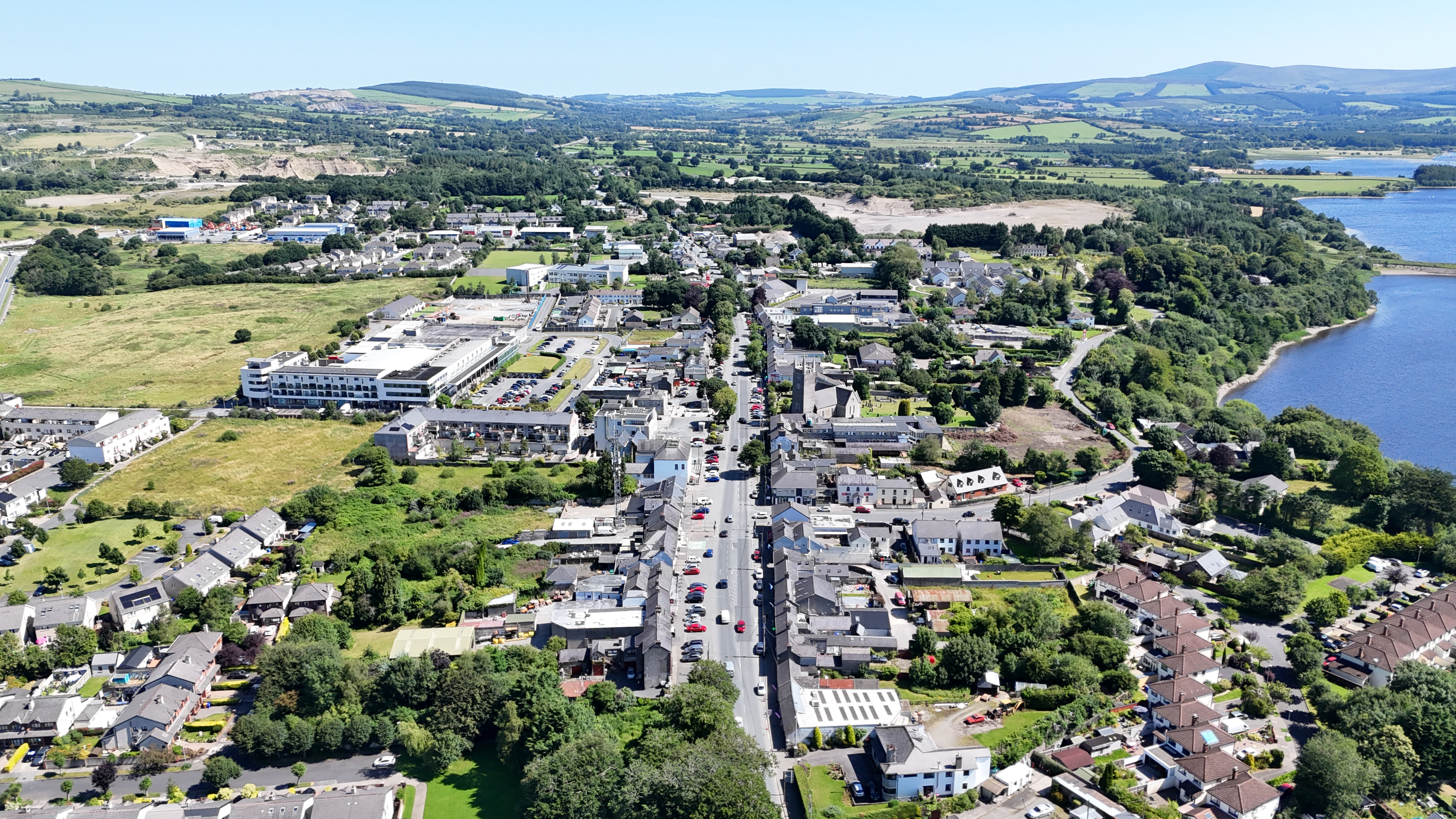
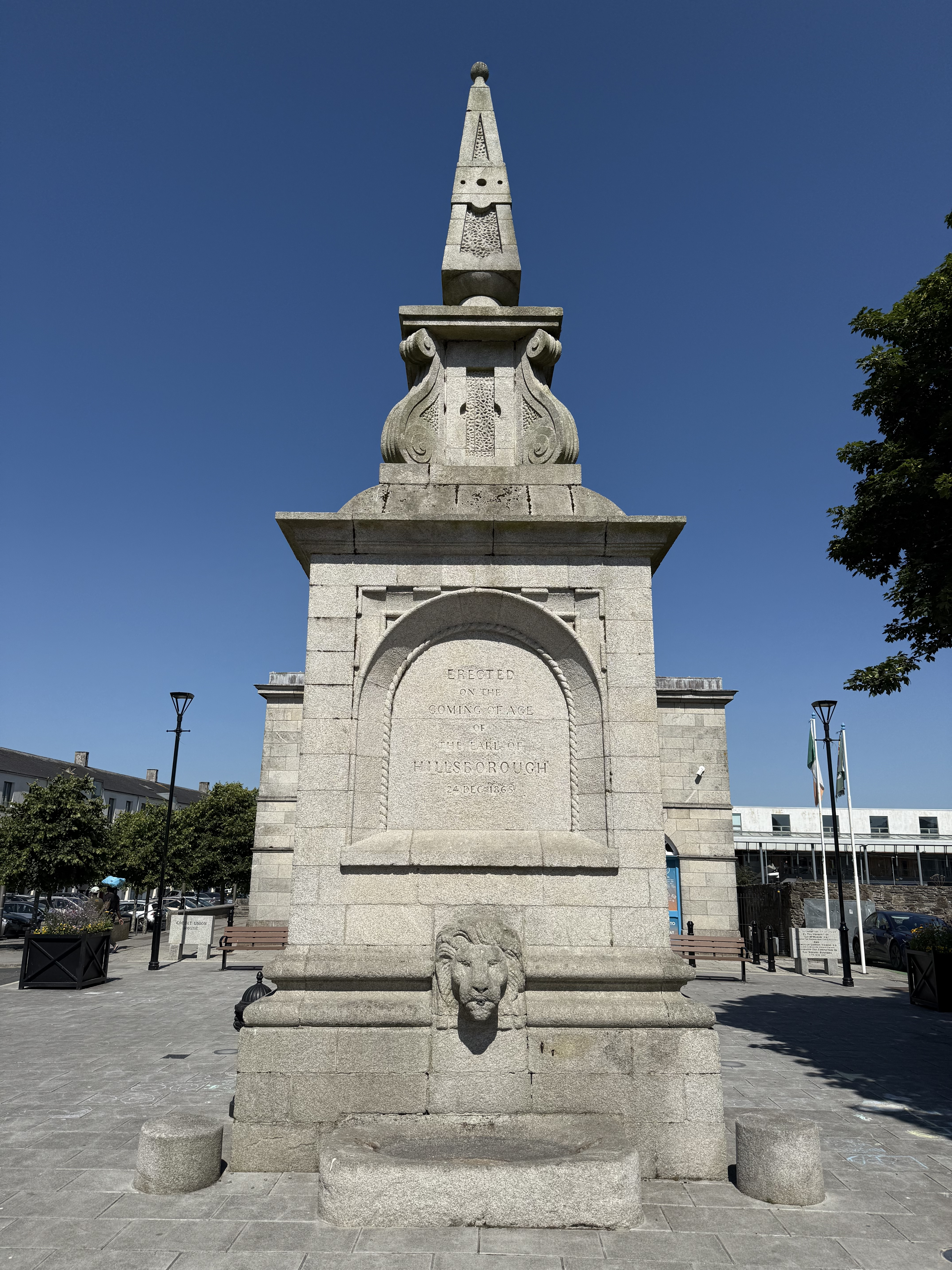
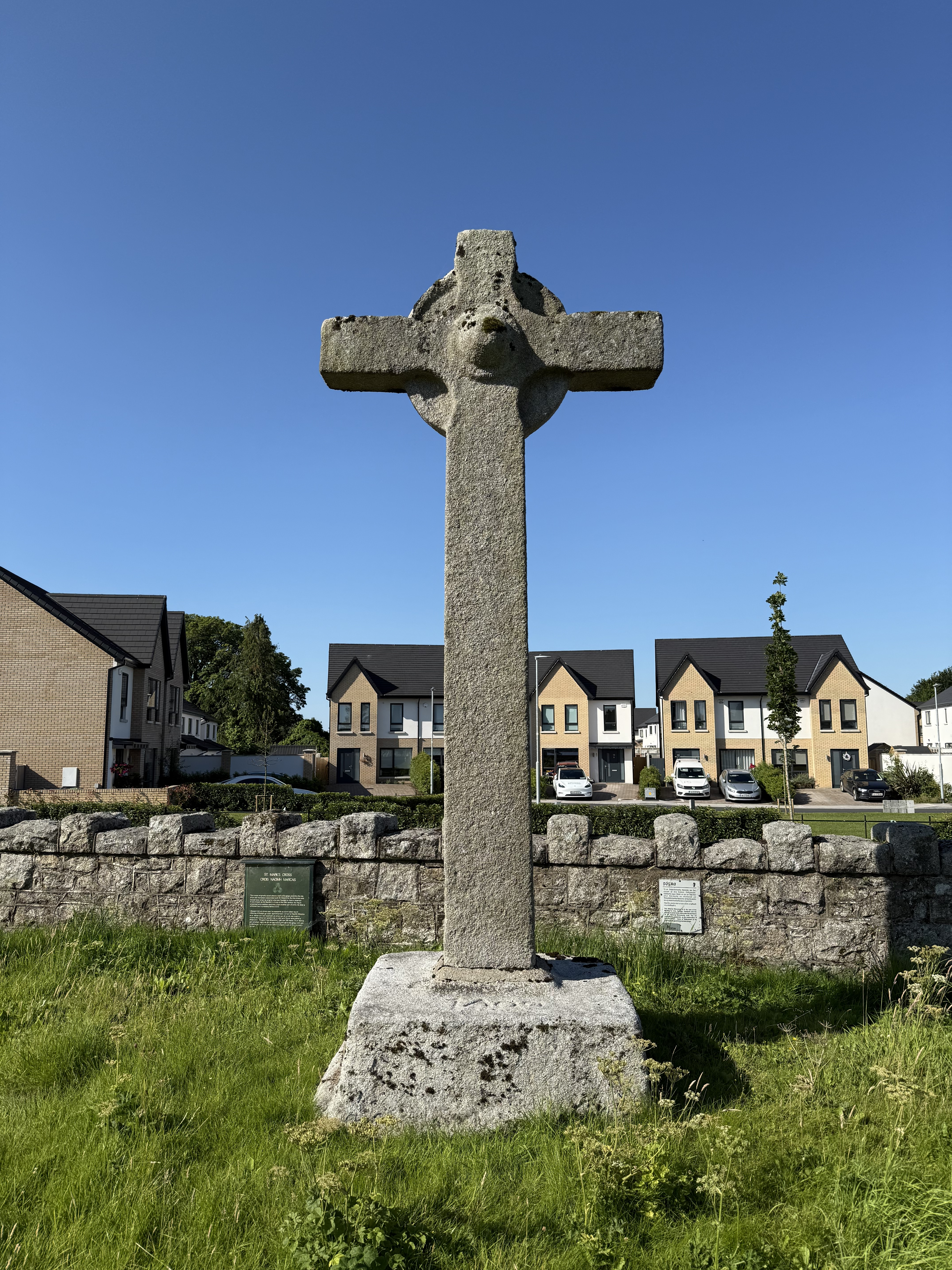
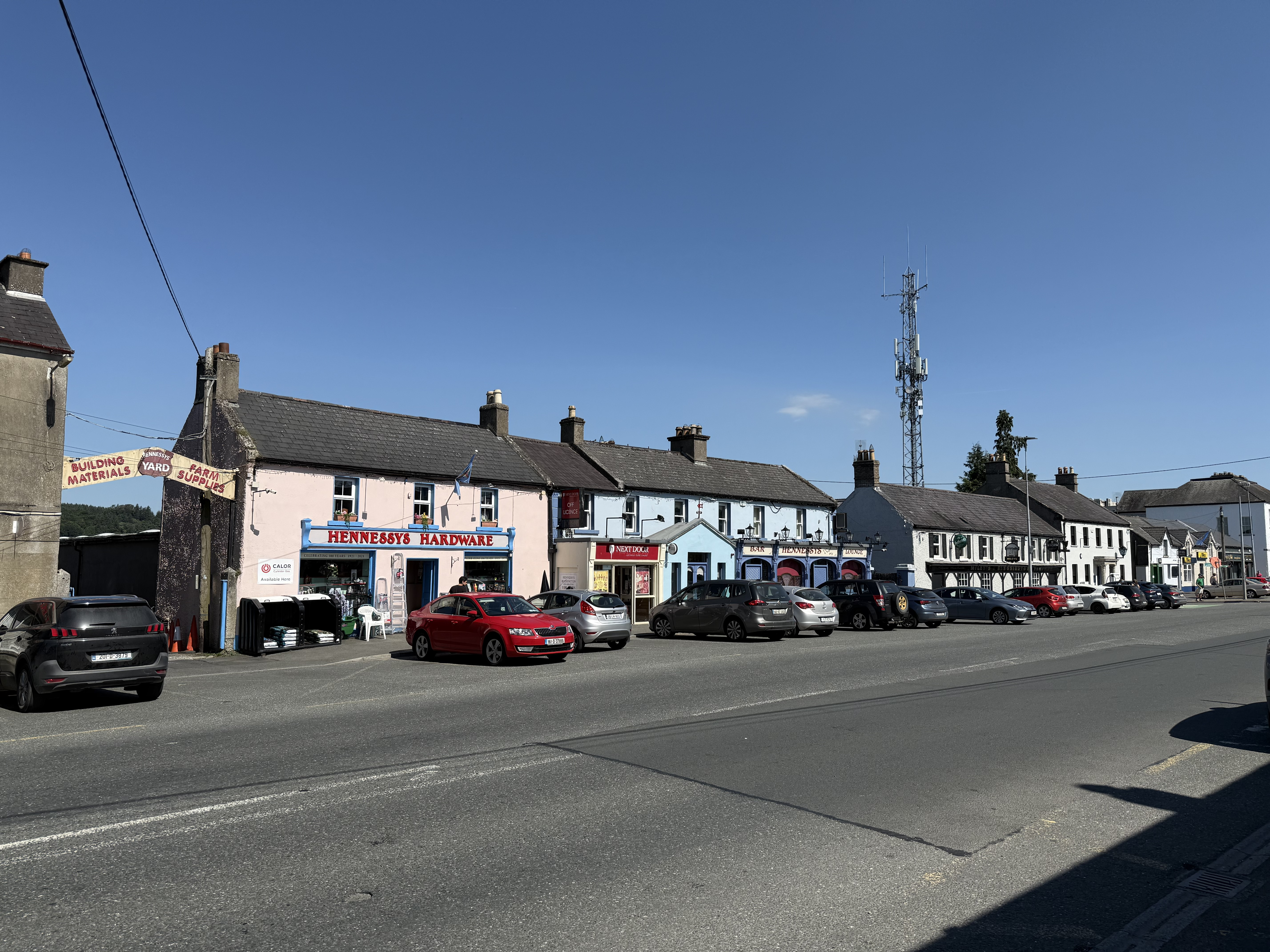
- Skyline of Blessington Downshire Monument St. Mark's Cross Main Street

- Location in Ireland
- Coordinates: 53.170°N 6.533°W
- Country: Ireland
- Province: Leinster
- County: County Wicklow
- Elevation: 223 m (732 ft)

Population (2022)
  - Total: 5,611
- Irish Grid Reference: N976142

Blessington, historically known as Ballycomeen (Irish: Baile Coimín, meaning 'town of Comyn', from the Irish surname Ó Coimín), is a town on the River Liffey in County Wicklow, Ireland, near the border with County Kildare. It is around 25 km south-west of Dublin, and is situated on the N81 road, which connects Dublin to Tullow. The town is in a townland and civil parish of the same name.

== History ==
=== Etymology ===
The current name 'Blessington' was first recorded in 1667. It may be based on a false etymology that confused the surname Coimín with the Irish word comaoin, which means blessing.

=== Ancient and medieval history ===
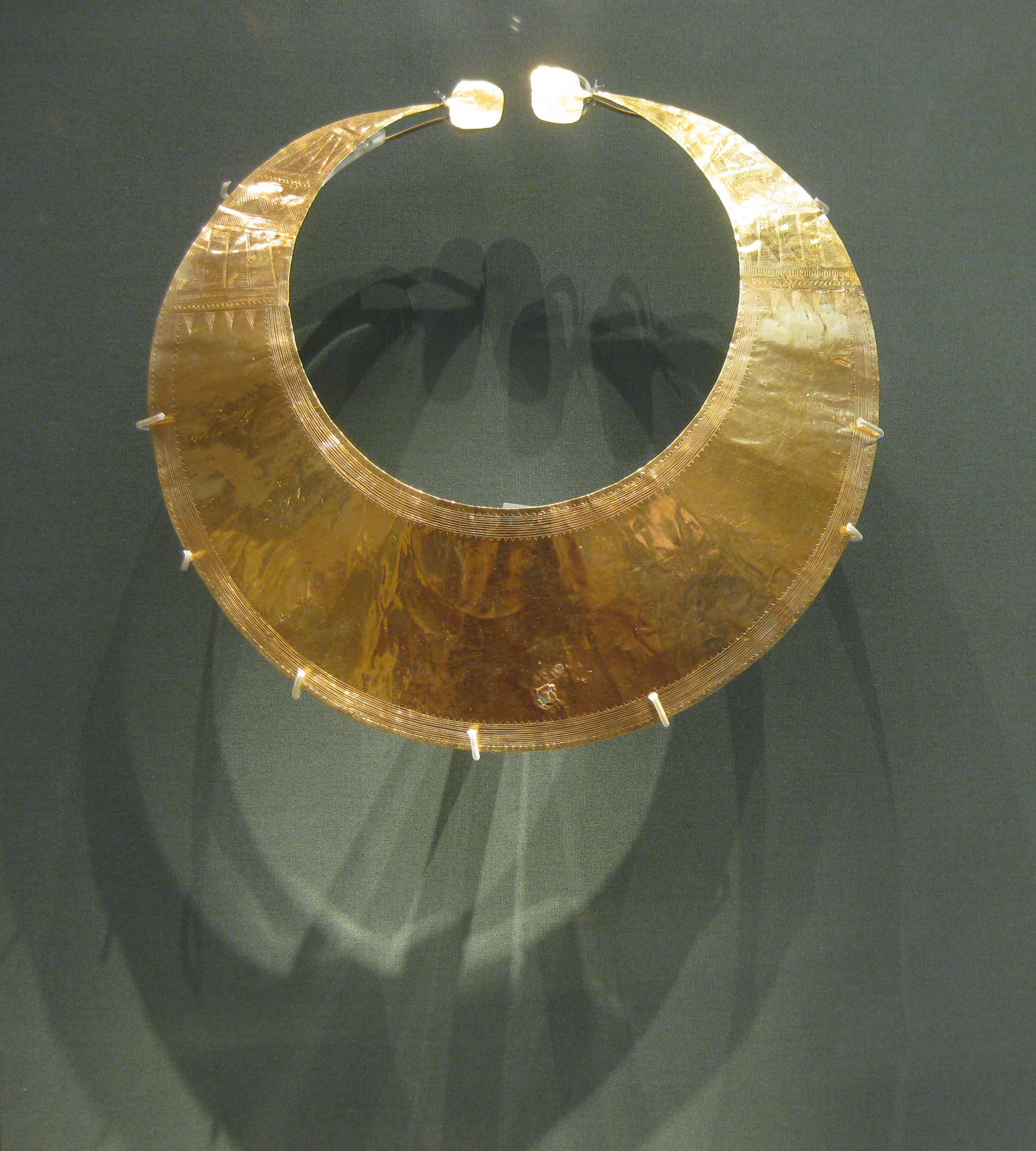
Gold lunula (2400 BCE - 2000 BCE) found in Blessington and now in the British Museum

Evidence of Bronze Age activity in the area is demonstrated by the spectacular Blessington gold lunula, now in the British Museum. The nearby Rath Turtle Moat was occupied from the 12th century onward by Norse Gaels and Normans.

Blessington was previously called Munfine, and in the medieval period was part of the lordship of Threecastles; Threecastles Castle is a three-storey tower house situated 5 km from Blessington, which was most likely built by Gerald Fitzgerald, Lord Deputy of Ireland, or his son Sir James Fitzgerald.

The abandoned medieval village of Burgage More is just south of Blessington town. It was an ecclesiastical settlement and is the site of a ruined tower house and church. A granite high cross named St. Mark's Cross was erected there in the 12th century beside a holy well. The cross was moved from Burgage More to Burgage Cemetery in the 20th century due to the construction of the Poulaphouca Reservoir and rising water levels.

=== Early modern history ===
In 1667, Michael Boyle, Church of Ireland Archbishop of Dublin and Lord Chancellor of Ireland, bought the lordship, previously the property of the Cheevers, for £1,000. Archbishop Boyle received a royal charter to establish the town of Blessington, in the townland of Munfine, as a borough.

Construction of Blessington House was begun in 1673 and afterwards St Mary's Church on Main Street, which was completed in 1683. On Archbishop Boyle's death in December 1702, his son, Murrough Boyle, 1st Viscount Blesington, inherited the Blessington estate. Lord Blessington's son, Charles, 2nd Viscount Blesington, died in June 1732 without an heir, and the estate was inherited by his sister Anne, then her son, William Stewart, 1st Earl of Blessington. The earl died in August 1769 without an heir and the estate passed to Charles Dunbar, a great-grandson of the 1st Viscount Blessington, who also died heirless in 1778, when the estate passed to Wills Hill, 1st Earl of Hillsborough, whose seat was Hillsborough Castle in Hillsborough, County Down, a great-great-grandson of Archbishop Boyle. Lord Hillsborough was created as the 1st Marquess of Downshire in August 1789. The Hills held the estate until 1908.

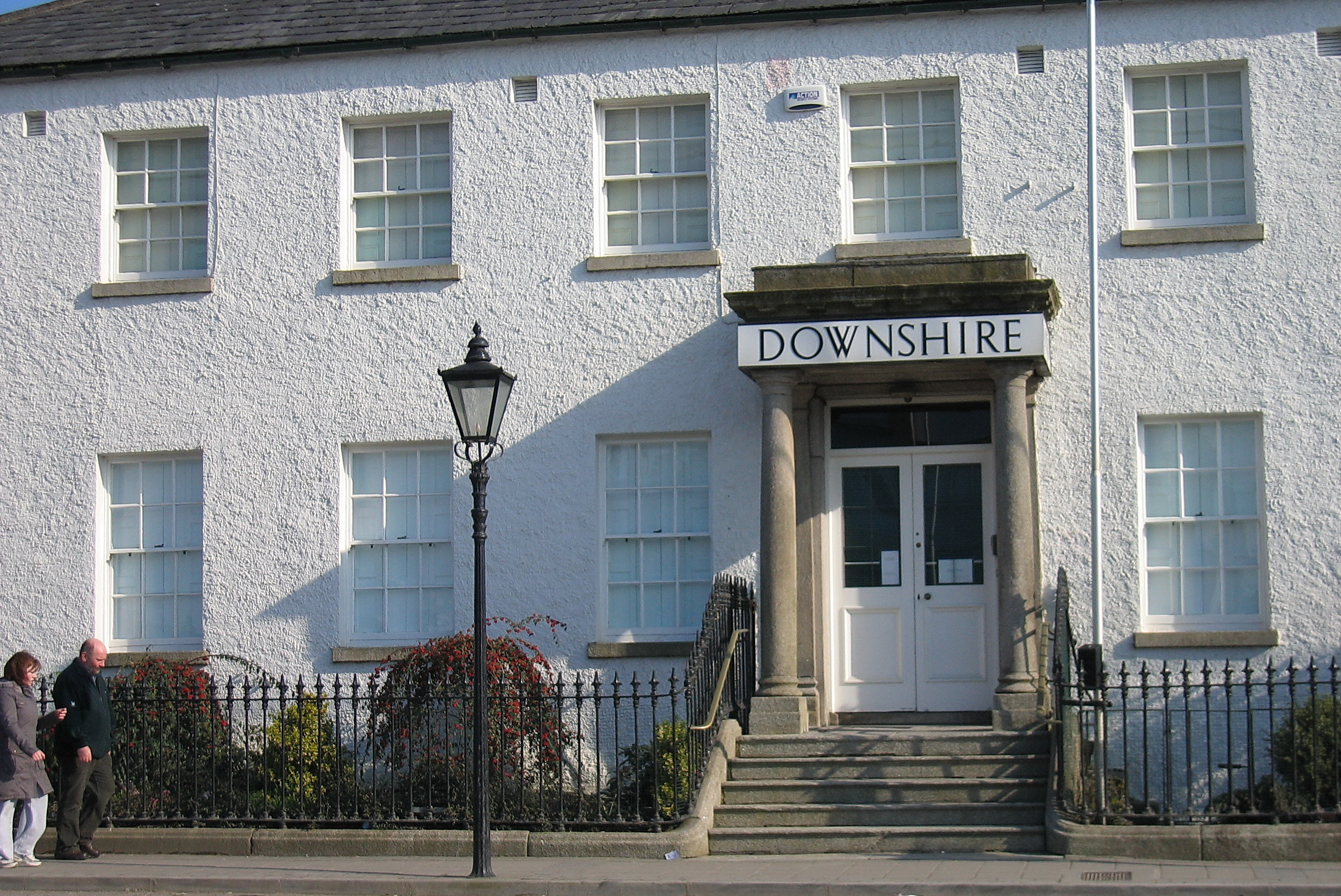
The Downshire Hotel, a landmark on Main Street, is now closed

The main road of the town is an example of a planned improvement of towns and villages associated with estates in the late 1700s and early 1800s. Arthur Hill, the 3rd Marquess of Downshire commissioned a house to be built for his agent c. 1820. The building later operated as the Downshire Hotel, until its closure in 2005. The Marquess was also responsible for the construction of several prominent buildings in the town such as the Market House (c. 1820), Downshire Lodge (c. 1830), and the Parish schoolhouse (c. 1830).

Russborough House, situated approximately 5 km south of Blessington, was built by the Leeson family, Earls of Milltown, and became the home of philanthropist Sir Alfred Beit (1903–1994), before becoming a museum.

=== 20th-century history ===
During the Irish Civil War, Blessington became a place of strategic importance for the Anti-Treaty forces who regrouped in the town after defeat in Dublin. It was envisioned that they could use the town as a base from which to link up with other Anti-Treaty fighters to launch a new attack on Dublin in July 1922. However, the plan was hampered by lack of coordination and provisions. The Anti-Treaty forces were quickly dispersed following a skirmish with Free State troops.

Above the nearby village of Lacken in the early hours of 18 April 1941, an RAF Handley Page Hampden aircraft (Registration AD730) got lost in bad weather and crashed on Black Hill (Kilbeg) killing its entire crew of four. The airmen were brought to Blessington and buried with full military honors on 22 April 1941 at St. Mary's Church by order of the Irish Government. The Irish Times the day after reported that “During the funeral all shops in Blessington were closed and blinds drawn on windows.” A memorial stone was unveiled at the crash site on 18 April 1991.

=== Modern development ===
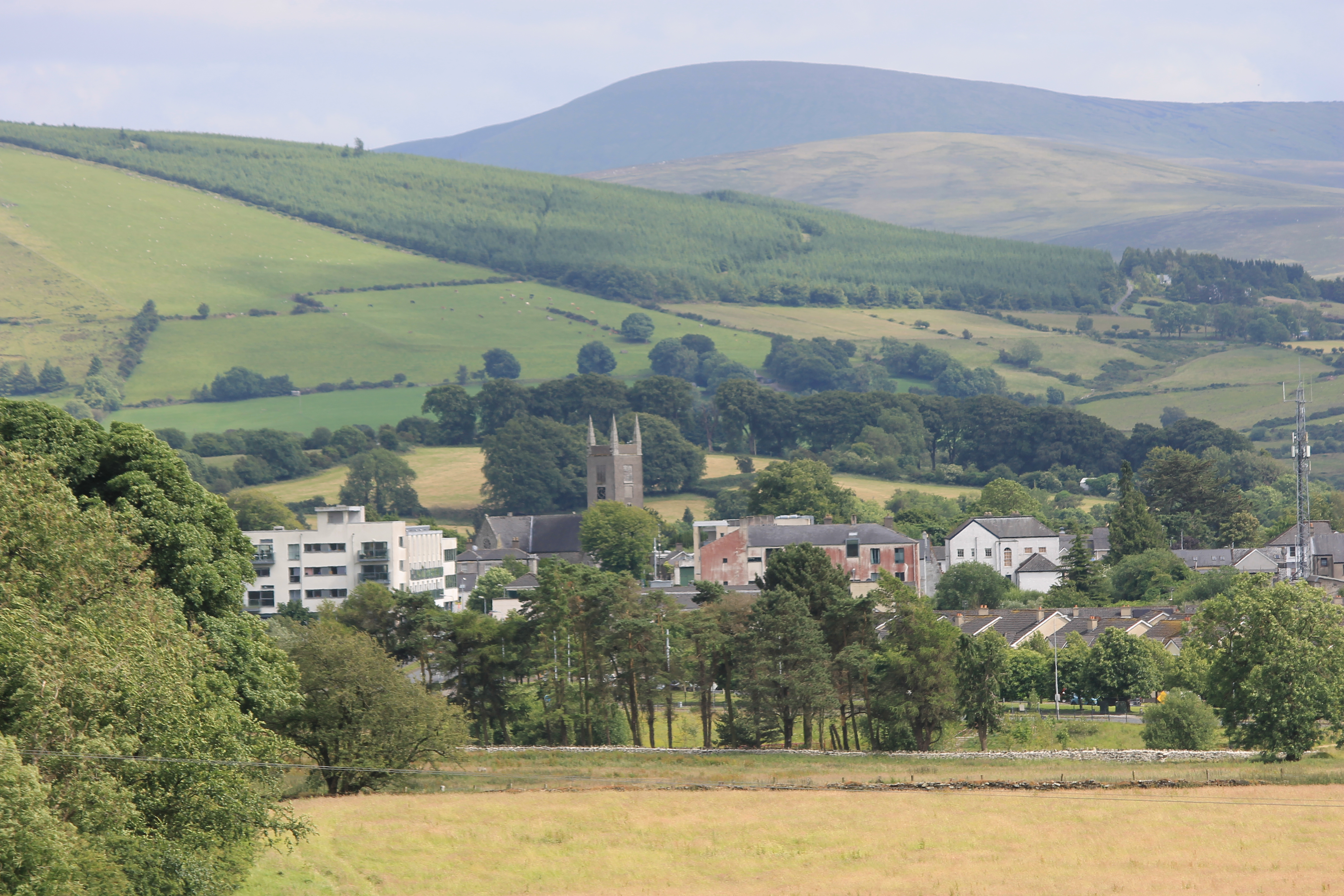
View of Blessington town from a field north of the town.

Since the turn of the 21st century, Blessington's population has increased substantially, more than doubling from 2,509 at the 2002 census, to 5,010 by the time of the 2011 census. Population reached 5,611 in 2022. The majority of housing estates were constructed on the western side of the town, off the R410, which is the road to Naas. A new inner bypass has also been opened that alleviates traffic on Main Street to some degree.

Infrastructure improvements since 2005 include a playground, fire station, a central retail development, including a Dunnes Stores outlet and a public library (opened in 2006) above it, expansion of a SuperValu supermarket, and addition of an ALDI supermarket.

== Amenities ==
=== Pubs ===
The town has a number of pubs, namely Hennessy's, Miley's, Murphy's, the West Wicklow House and the Rambler's Rest.

=== St Mary's Church ===
St Mary's Church is situated in Market Square, in the middle of the town. It was built around 1683, having been financed by Archbishop Boyle. While most of the church was rebuilt in the 19th century, the tower of this old church remains at the west end.

The church is well known in the bell-ringing community for housing the oldest complete set of bells in Ireland. The six bells date to 1682 and were cast by James Bartlet, who was the master founder of Whitechapel at that time. The money for these was also given by Archbishop Boyle. They are still rung twice a week, for Sunday morning service and on Saturday nights, for ringing practice.

While it holds the oldest peal of change-ringing bells in Ireland, the oldest bells hung for change-ringing in Ireland are found in St Audoen's Church in Dublin city centre. Three of the bells (the 3, 4, and 5 of the 6 bell-peal) date to 1453, and were cast in York.

=== Poulaphouca Reservoir ===
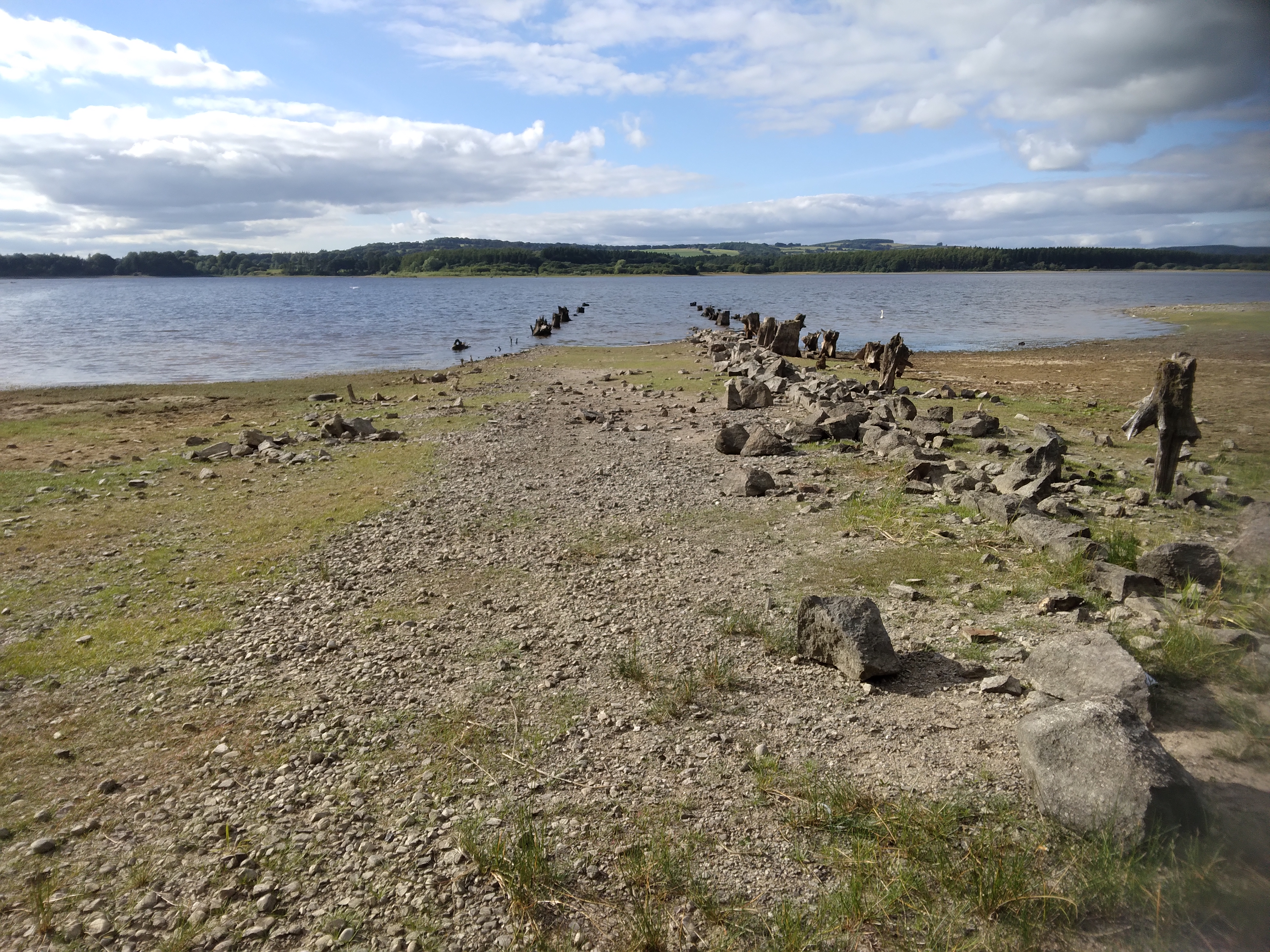
Remains of a road leading into the reservoir (pictured during a drought, August 2022)

Also known locally as the Blessington Lakes, the reservoir was created in 1940 when the waterfall at Poulaphouca on the River Liffey (which flows from the Wicklow Mountains to Dublin) was dammed by the ESB for a hydroelectric plant which is still in use today. The valley was flooded and the resulting lakes extend over approximately 5,000 acres (2,023 ha). A small village called Ballinahown was submerged by the damming of the waterfall, and the remains of roads can still be seen leading down into the lake.

In addition to electricity, the lakes also provide water for the locality and the Dublin region as well as provide a leisure resource. There is now a lakeside luxury hotel complex in the Blessington area, with its own helipad, and lakeside facilities which have helped to develop tourism in the area. The lake is also extensively used by boatmen and fishermen, and is a training location for the Irish Air Corps HQ divisions from Baldonnel, 15 km north of Blessington, and also Local Civil Defence Water rescue teams.

=== Blessington Greenway ===
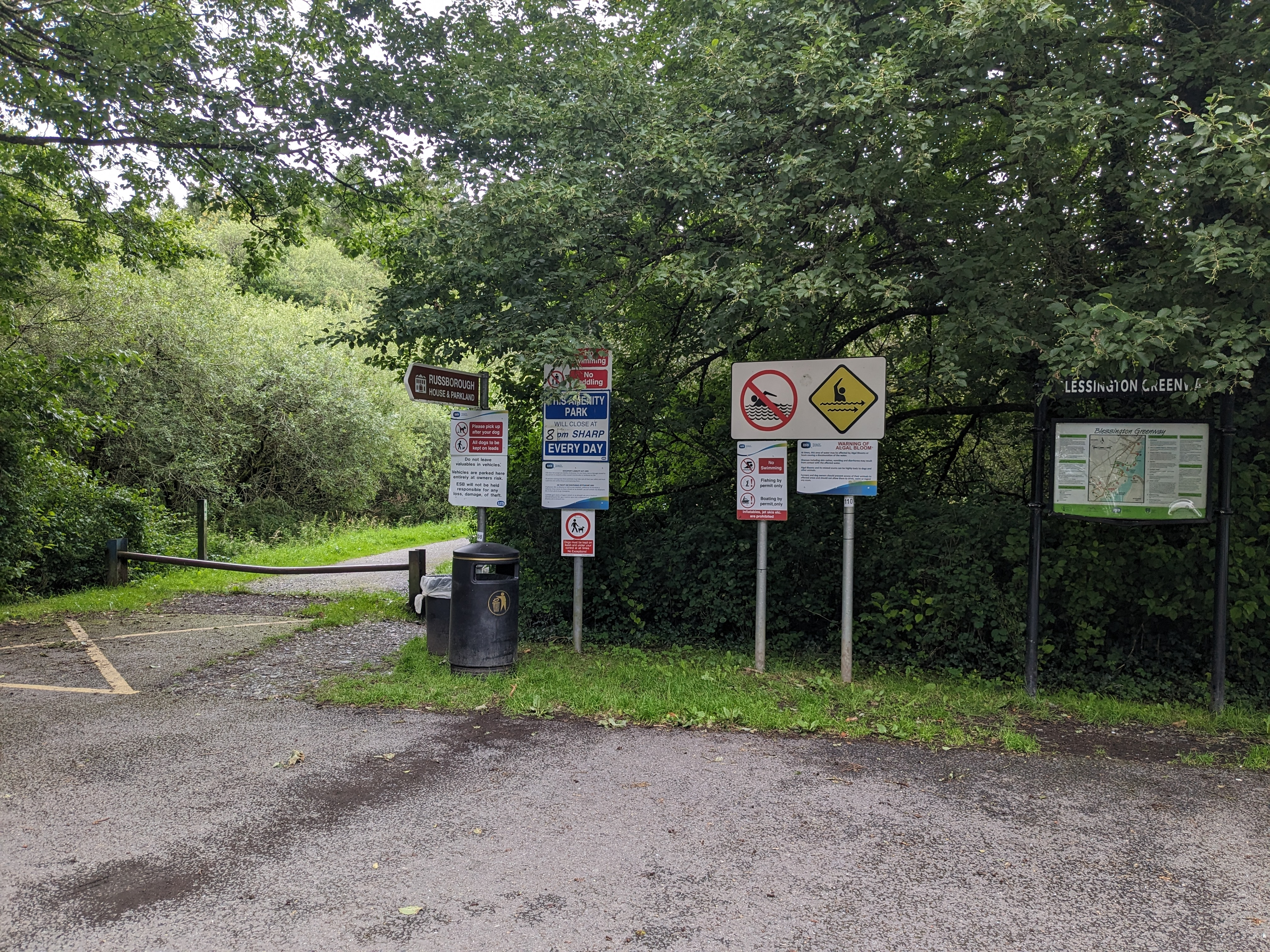
Blessington Greenway at Russellstown Bay adjacent to Russborough House

The Blessington Greenway is a 6.5 km walking trail that links Blessington with Russborough House. The trail starts in Blessington and leads south to The Avon activity centre at the southern edge of the town where it then follows along the lake shore, crossing a medieval ringfort, and uses the footpath along part of the N81 road before turning back into the forest at Burgage Moyle lane. It then crosses the Valleymount Road (R758) and makes its way to Russellstown Bay adjacent to Russborough House. A second phase for the greenway, laid out in a planning submission by Wicklow County Council in early 2022, is proposed to expand the trail to include a 33 km loop surrounding the lake, taking in the villages of Lacken, Valleymount and Ballyknockan.

== Transport ==
In 1888, the Dublin and Blessington Steam Tramway service commenced from Terenure to Blessington via Tallaght, linking with the horse trams from the city. This service ended at the end of December 1932 and was replaced with a conventional bus service, Dublin Bus route 65. Lacking a train station in the town, this service continues to operate as the main public transport connection between Blessington and Dublin city.

Blessington is on the N81 national secondary road, and is connected via the R410 regional road with Naas. The latter starts in the south end of the town heading west and proceeds through a natural gap in the hills of Glending Forest and Eadestown. The route is treacherous during heavy winter snowfalls, and is sometimes closed in severe conditions.

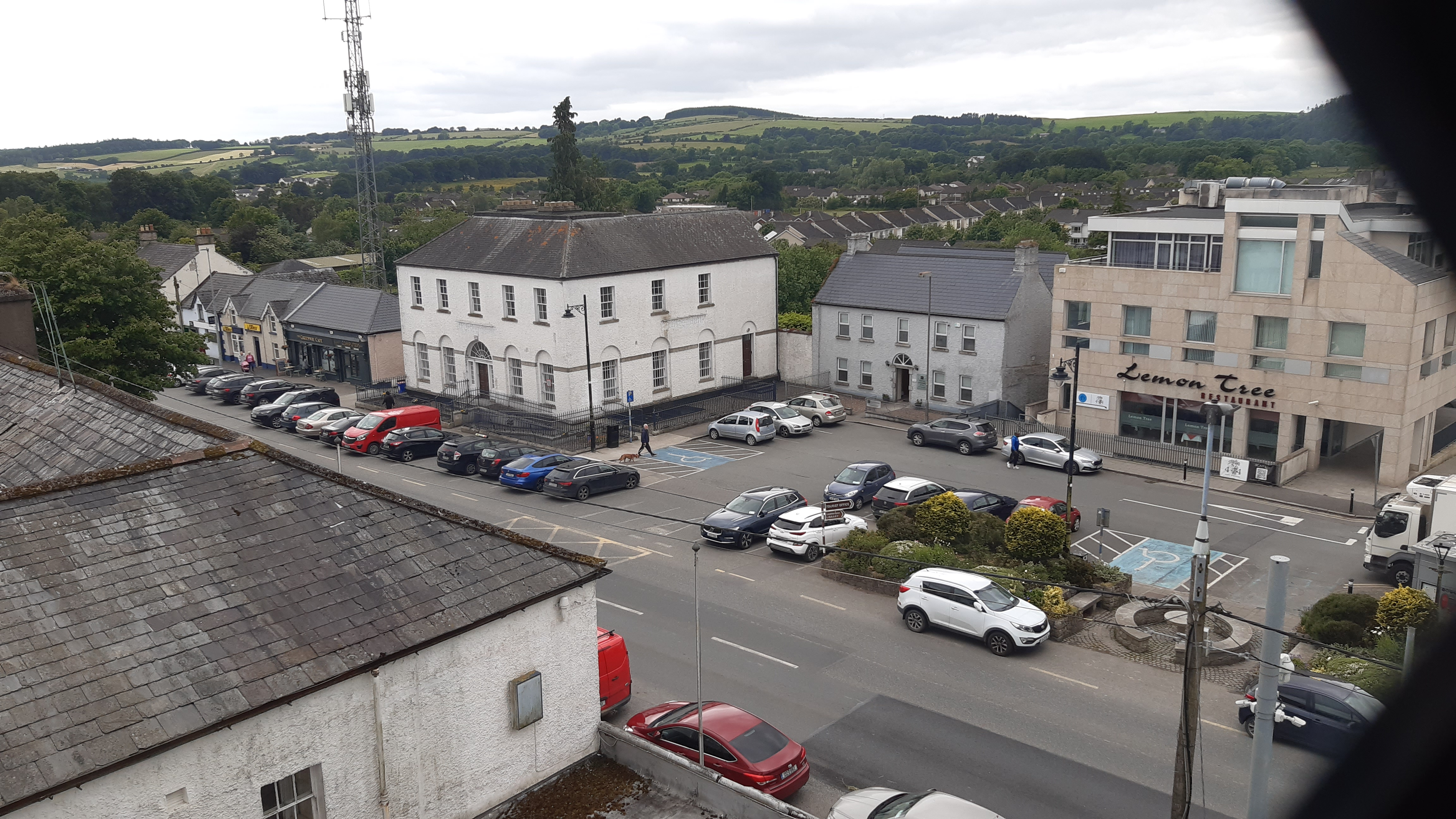
The town square as seen from the tower of St Mary's Church (Slieveroe hill in the background)

Since August 2021, Blessington has been served by route 884, a Mon-Fri public bus service operated by TFI Local Link Kildare South Dublin, which connects the town with Naas and Sallins railway station. The arrivals at the railway station are scheduled to link in with departures to, and arrivals from, Heuston railway station in Dublin.

Dublin Bus route 65, starting at Poolbeg Street in Dublin City Centre, takes approximately 1 hour 15 minutes and passes through Rathmines, Terenure, Templeogue, Tallaght, and Brittas on its way to Blessington. A limited number of daily services on route 65 are also extended to Ballyknockan and Ballymore Eustace. The Ballymore service routes via the N81, as does the Ballyknockan service.

Bus Éireann route 132 (Dublin-Bunclody) routes via Tallaght Hospital, Blessington, Baltinglass and Rathvilly en route to Bunclody. One journey is extended weekly to Wexford and Rosslare Europort.

== Education ==
The town and its hinterlands are served by several primary schools and one secondary school.

The local primary schools include St Mary's National School, a Roman Catholic national school, which comprises St Mary's Junior National School (infants to 2nd class) and St Mary's Senior National School (3rd to 6th class). As of 2019, the combined coeducational school(s) had over 600 pupils enrolled. The local Church of Ireland national school is known as Blessington Number 1 National School, and had approximately 200 pupils enrolled in 2018.

Gaelscoil na Lochanna (School of the Lakes) is a gaelscoil which was founded in 2006 to cater for those in the area who wished to educate their children primarily through the Irish language. As of 2022, it had 169 pupils enrolled. A nearby Educate Together national school was founded in 2006 on the site of a long-standing school and has a large sports field.

The only secondary school in Blessington, Blessington Community College, is on the Naas Road and had an enrolment (in 2022) of 584.

== Notable people ==
Former or current residents of the town have included:

- Bobbi Arlo, singer
- Sir Alfred Lane Beit (1903–1994), British Conservative Party politician, art collector, philanthropist, honorary Irish citizen, and owner of Russborough House.
- Gerald Boland (1885–1973), Irish Fianna Fáil politician who briefly commanded the 3rd South Dublin Brigade in Blessington.
- Jack Boothman (1935–2016), 31st president of the Gaelic Athletic Association (GAA) between 1994 and 1997.
- Elizabeth Grant (1797–1885), Scottish diarist and lady of the manor of Baltyboys House.
- Josh Gray (born 1997), former member of disbanded six-piece Irish boy band HomeTown (2014–2016) managed by Louis Walsh.
- John Lackey, Irish road racing cyclist, cycle sport administrator and Tour of Ireland race director.
- Frank McCann, Blessington publican convicted of the murder of his wife Esther and eighteen-month-old foster-daughter Jessica in September 1992.
- Kevin McClory (1924–2006), Irish screenwriter, film producer, and film director who produced the James Bond film Thunderball.
- Lorenzo Moore (1808–1894), noted Anglican clergyman in New Zealand, who was born in Blessington.
- Dr. Patrick Purcell, owner of the car which was linked to the killing of Lizzie O'Neill in June 1925.
- Louise Quinn (born 1990), Republic of Ireland national football team player.
- Isaac Sharp (1681–1735), early New Jersey settler, politician and judge who settled in Salem County, New Jersey and originally named the area Blessingtown after his home town.
- Dame Ninette de Valois (née Edris Stannus) (1898–2001), Irish-born British dancer, choreographer, and director of classical ballet who spent her childhood at Baltiboys near Blessington.
- Brian Warfield (born 1946), vocalist, banjo, harp, and bodhrán player and lead songwriter with Irish band The Wolfe Tones.

== See also ==
- Gleninsheen gorget – Bronze Age gold collar from Ireland
- KnockanStockan – Irish independent music festival which existed from 2007 to 2019
- List of towns and villages in Ireland
- Market Houses in Ireland
- Seefin Passage Tomb – Passage grave in County Wicklow, Ireland
