= Ballyknockan =

Village in County Wicklow, Ireland

Ballyknockan Buaile an Chnocáin
- Village
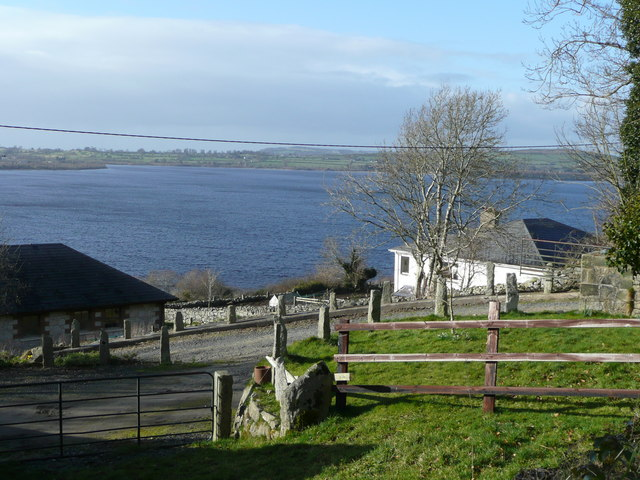
- Ballyknockan overlooks Poulaphouca Reservoir

- Location in Ireland
- Coordinates: 53°06′21″N 6°29′52″W
- Country: Ireland
- Province: Leinster
- County: County Wicklow

Population (2016)
  - Total: 227

Ballyknockan or Ballynockan (/bæləˈnɒkən/ bal-ə-NOK-ən; Irish: Buaile an Chnocáin) is a village and townland in County Wicklow, Ireland. The village is known for its granite quarries which were the site of intensive industry from 1824 until the mid-20th century.

Ballyknockan is situated on the western edge of the Wicklow Mountains, where a large granite band extends from Dublin Bay to County Carlow. The village is located 220 m (722 ft) above sea level, and is around 40 km (25 mi) from Dublin.

The historian Maurice Craig noted in 1997 that the village was unique amongst the villages of Leinster, and possibly unique in all of Ireland, due to the abundance of stone which was used in the construction of things "which in other villages are made of less durable materials."

== History ==
The valley below Ballyknockan, where the Kings River once joined the River Liffey (before the valley was flooded), was inhabited during the Stone Age. Local historian C.J. Darby identified an ancient burial site at Carrigacurra on the edge of the shoreline of the lake in early 2010, charcoal remains from which were dated to between 760-414 BC. Other archaeological monuments in the vicinity of the village include a fulacht fiadh, children's burial ground (cillín), bullaun stone, and ringfort.

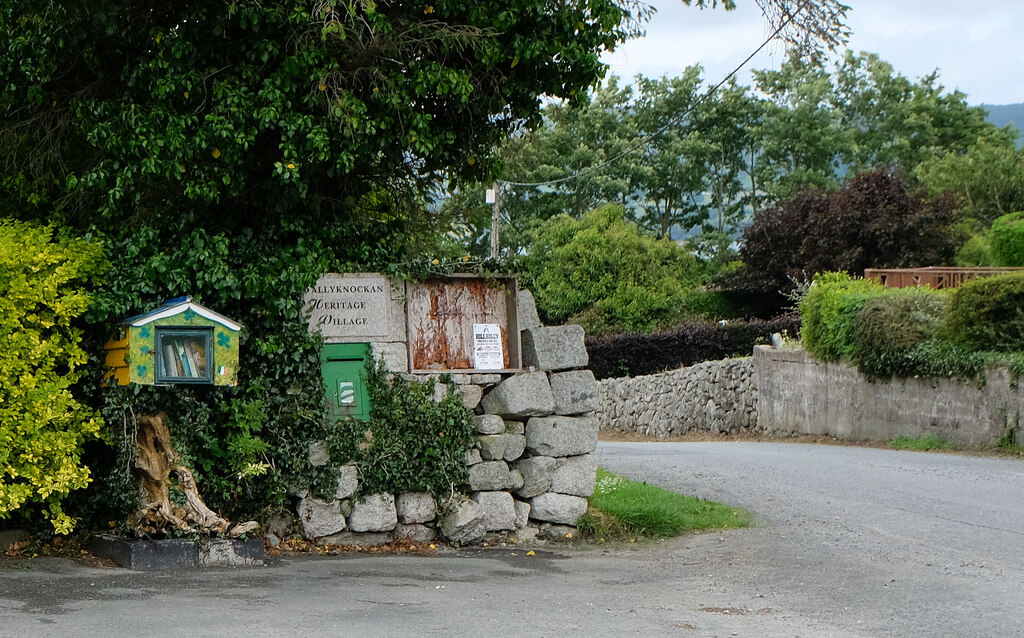
Postbox in the village

It is not known at what point the village of Ballyknockan itself was established, but a location named "Boylenknoccan" is first mentioned in the Calendar to Fiants of the reign of Henry VIII in 1569. "Boylenknoccan" derived from the Gaelic words 'buaile' ('buailidh', meaning a cattle fold or summer pasture), and 'cnocán' (meaning a hillock). The practice of booleying, where cattle are moved to summer pastures for grazing, was used in ancient Ireland and practiced in places like the Wicklow Mountains until relatively recently. Places named 'Bolenstokane' and 'Bolinknockan' are marked in the Down Survey of 1656-1658.

=== Quarrying industry ===
The village underwent considerable change once the first granite quarries were opened in 1824. The site became "probably the most important area for supplying cut stone blocks of granite for the construction of many of Dublin city's major public buildings" of the era, according to the Geological Survey of Ireland, helped by a boom in church building across Ireland after the Catholic Emancipation Act 1829, and an emerging Catholic population who were becoming increasingly able to afford monumental headstones.

Many of the first quarry workers came from nearby Manor Kilbride and the Golden Hill quarry there. According to an Ordnance survey of 1838, there were 400 people living in Ballyknockan, of whom 160 were employed in the quarries. Three pre-famine era churches on Westland Row in Dublin were built exclusively of Ballyknockan granite, as was Saint Francis Xavier Church on Gardiner Street.

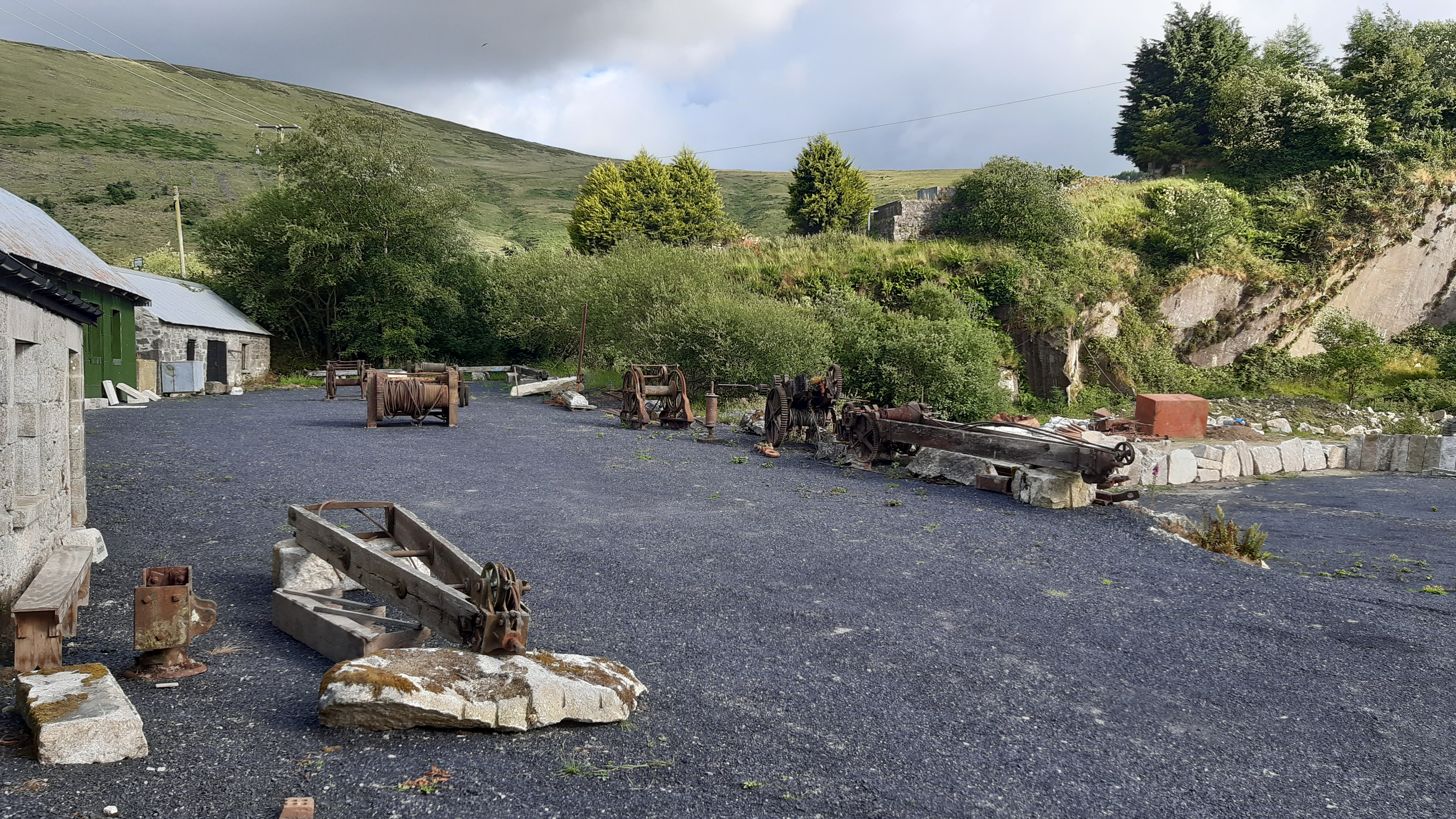
The yard of McEvoy Stone, one of the original granite quarries, with old quarrying machinery on display in 2024

For the benefit of the children of quarry workers, the Marquess of Waterford built a fee-paying school in the village, at which pupils paid between one pence or three pence a week, depending on their level, providing the teacher with an annual salary of six pounds. As of 1866, there were 23 males, and 7 females in attendance at the school. A non fee-paying school was also available in the village of Valleymount nearby.

=== Ballyknockan Brass Band ===
The Ballyknockan Brass Band were mentioned in the Leinster Express newspaper in 1880, when they played at a large land meeting in Blessington at the height of the Land League era. Two thousand people attended the meeting. The band became "one of the best in Ireland", performing every Sunday in Blessington, and also played at Carton House, County Kildare on Whit Monday, June 1887. In the late 19th century, brass bands became very popular in the United Kingdom of Great Britain and Ireland, to which Ireland still belonged at the time:

Like the workingman bands in Great Britain at the time, the songs and airs they performed were mostly classical and popular opera pieces. However, the influence of the Gaelic League popularised patriotic and nationalistic songs and airs (in Ireland). The bandsmen were very involved in the days politics, and as part of the Gaelic League participated in Gaelic sports. The famous Ballyknockan Crosspikes 98's football team began in 1887, with many bandsmen amongst its ranks. Their name was derived from the 1798 rebellion, and the emblem was two crossed pikes.

According to Barry Kinane in "Welcome to the Granite City: A Social History of Ballyknockan", the "sound of practicing musicians would have filled the evening air in Ballyknockan in the later nineteenth century." At the time, Ballyknockan was a thriving community, and the village social life would have revolved around the Ballyknockan Brass Band and the Crosspikes 98's Gaelic football team. Whenever the team played, the band would be there to accompany them.

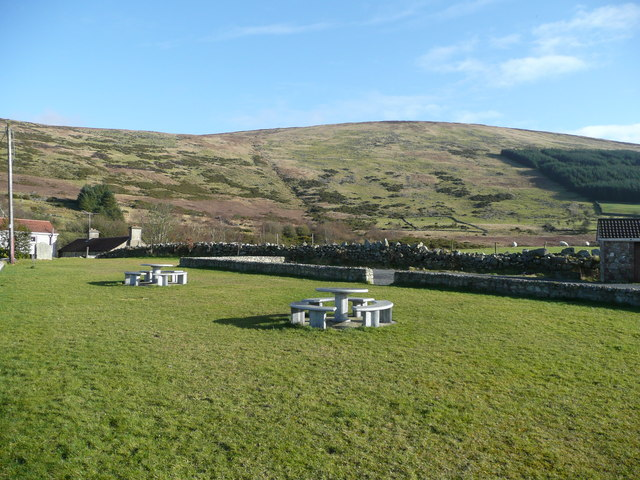
A picnic area in the village, with the slopes of Silsean hill in the background

The band had many benefactors, including Thomas Myles O'Reilly, a prominent local figure who was the UCD-educated son of a local quarry owner, and also a politician, journalist, historian and close friend of Charles Stewart Parnell. O'Reilly, writing under the handle of T.M. O'Reilly, had a weekly column in the Kildare Observer entitled "Wicklow Notes", and was instrumental in the fight against the 'Landgrabber' - involving many land disputes with Lord Waterford over grazing rights. O'Reilly was arrested and imprisoned in Naas Gaol in November 1881 after being suspected of inciting unrest as part of the Irish National League, but was released in early 1882.

In 1890, the Irish Parliamentary Party split after it was discovered that Charles Stewart Parnell had had an affair with a married woman, Kitty O'Shea, in what became one of the greatest political scandals of the late 19th century. During the crisis years, the band divided into two opposing factions; the Parnellites and the Healyites (after Tim Healy, an outspoken anti-Parnellite). A local priest, Monstsignor M. Browne (1892-1979), serving as the curate of Valleymount, wrote a book named "In Monavalla" (1963) under the pseudonym of Joseph Brady, which told the story of a night in Ballyknockan when the anti-Parnellites raided the band hall and stole instruments, some of which were found in a field the following day. The book was loosely based on fact, as recounted by Barry Kinane:

The turbulence and unrest between the musicians made the columns of the local papers. This compelled the local parish priest, Fr. Rowan, to write a letter to the newspaper to defend quarry owner William Osborne. There were reports of police activity, drunkenness, smashes windows, swords, and animosity between the workers and William Osborne. Osborne had previously supported the football team and band and built the 'band house' that the band rented. During the dispute, he threw the band out and confiscated their instruments.

A brass band festival took place at Poulaphouca in September 1898, at which the Protestant Row Band and the Dublin Bricklayers Band were to participate, along with the Ballyknockan Brass Band. Extra tram services were implemented on the Blessington and Poulaphouca Steam Tramway to convey people from Dublin and Blessington to the event. A series of arguments broke out at the festival, owing to political tensions:

...one (argument) involved a man from Carrigacurra and the leader of Protestant Row Band. It got so out of control that the police from Hollywood could hardly contain it. Perhaps some of the unionist airs of the Protestant Row Band and too much drink upset the staunchly nationalistic Ballyknockan men. It was not until one of the other bands played some airs "dear to the men's hearts" that the fighting ceased...

The band were known as the Ballyknockan Parnell Independent Brass Band for a period, before settling on the less politically-affiliated name of the Ballyknockan Stonecutters Brass Band by 1904. Around this time, a band named the Blessington Fife and Drum Band existed concurrently in Blessington.

=== Land War period ===
In 1885, Lord Waterford served notice on the people of Ballyknockan to evict 500 people from "Kyle to Carrigacurra" for the non-payment of rent. T.M. O'Reilly wrote a letter to the Freeman's Journal where he publicly attacked Lord Waterford by writing he was "posing before the public as a model landlord while his treatment was bringing misery and ruin in a happy and industrious community." Waterford took legal action against O'Reilly, who was representing the tenants. In November 1885, bonfires were lit over the hills to celebrate O'Reilly's win over the landlord.

Ballyknockan was an area of anti-landlord agitation during the Land War. In 1887, a widow named Biddy Mulvey and her blind sister were to be evicted from their home. Men employed by her landlord, Michael "Thunder" Cullen, knocked the roof of her house in May of that year and evicted the family while they were at mass. A law at the time stated that if a house was built within a day with smoke coming out of the chimney, the occupants couldn't be evicted. The community worked together and built a house in a day for them and the fire was lit, ensuring they could not be evicted. The Leinster Leader reported that the Ballyknockan Brass Band, with their "splendid brass instruments in order, accompanied by the Ballyknockan 98 Cross Pikes in their uniforms" helped march Biddy Mulvey back to her home. A plaque commemorating the event can be seen on the remains of the ruined cottage.

=== Later years ===
In June 1905, J. J. Redmond, a technical instructor for County Wicklow, commenced a series of lectures in Ballyknockan for the stonecutters and quarry workers, to educate the men on new technical developments and techniques in stonemasonry. John Doyle, a local stonemason, was the Ballyknockan Brass Band's major at this time, whose workmanship replicating the ancient high cross of Glendalough was displayed at the Irish International Exhibition in May 1907.

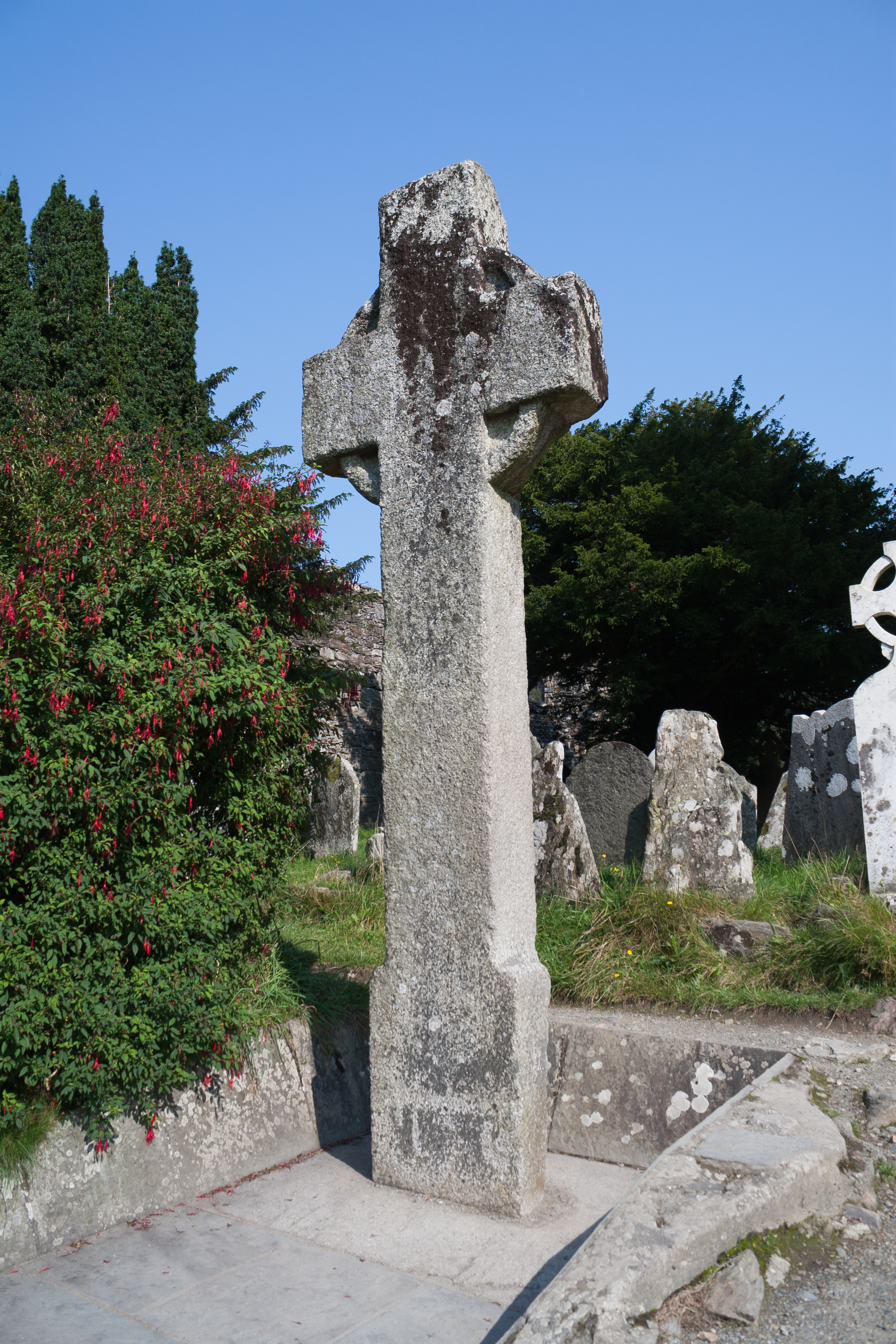
The high cross at Glendalough

In 1940, the village of Balinahown was completely flooded and parts of the surrounding villages of Valleymount and Lacken were also flooded to make way for the Poulaphouca Reservoir which spans out over 20 km^{2} (8 sq mi) across the land. The valley was flooded to a height of 180m (500ft) above sea level. Since then, the village overlooks the reservoir that provides water to thousands of Dublin homes and creates electricity, while also offering many water pursuits such as fishing, sailing, windsurfing, boating, and leisure cruising and canoeing.

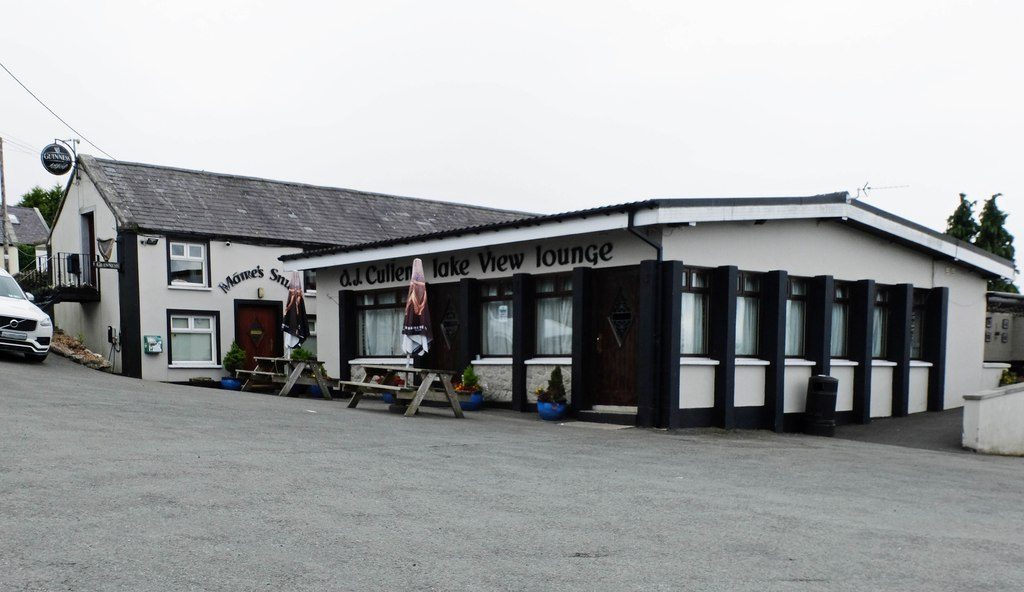
Cullens bar, Ballyknockan in 2025

In October 1941, a commemoration procession was held in Dublin for Charles Stewart Parnell. Crowds assembled at Stephens Green to march to the Parnell Monument on O'Connell Street and then to Glasnevin Cemetery to his graveside for a ceremony. Such was the reputation of the Ballyknockan Brass Band that they held a place marching behind the Lord Mayor of Dublin, ahead of the GAA and the IRA Veteran's Band. They were also invited to perform in Croke Park at the 25th anniversary of the Easter Rising on 14 April 1941. Apart from the prestige of these occasions, the band went into decline during the 1950s. One of the last appearances of the band was on 11 December 1952 at an event to mark the switching on of electricity in Valleymount for the first time.

Ballyknockan became less important as the demand for stone declined with the advent of concrete products, and the parish life of the village gravitated towards nearby Valleymount. With new developments in concrete, many local young men had no employment prospects in the quarries and had to emigrate to England to find work. By 1970, the golden age of quarrying stone in the village had mostly ended.

Ballyknockan hosted KnockanStockan from 2007 until 2019, an independent music festival held annually in the summer.

== Built heritage ==
Stonemasons employed in the quarries from 1824 eventually started settling in the village and built houses for themselves, using the ample granite available in the construction of their homes. As recorded in Ó Maitiú and O'Reilly's 1997 book "Ballyknockan: A Wicklow Stonecutters' Village":

Signs on the approach road welcome visitors to Ballyknockan Granite Village and helps prepare them for a most remarkable heritage... Door and window surrounds, chimneys, fireplaces, verges and barges are almost always well-cut and dressed and often chamfered. Associated out-buildings are similarly treated. Ashlar work is common in the village. Only wells, drains and structures built into the slope tend to be rougher in construction. Floors are often of well-fitted stone flags. Fireplaces tend to be decorated, albeit soberly. Worked stone intended for buildings and carved decorative pieces for churches, graveyards, etc. lie scattered throughout the district.

== Filming location ==
The following works have been filmed in part in Ballyknockan:

- Captain Boycott (1947)
- Shake Hands with the Devil (1959)
- The Irish R.M. (1983-1985) featured a scene in the old quarry in one episode
- The Lilac Bus (1990)
- Widows' Peak (1994)
- P.S. I Love You (2007)

== See also ==
- List of towns and villages in Ireland
- Glyder, a local metal band
- Tŷ unnos, an old Welsh belief that if a person could build a house on common land in one night, the land then belonged to them as a freehold
