= Valleymount =

Village in County Wicklow, Ireland

Valleymount An Chrois
- Village
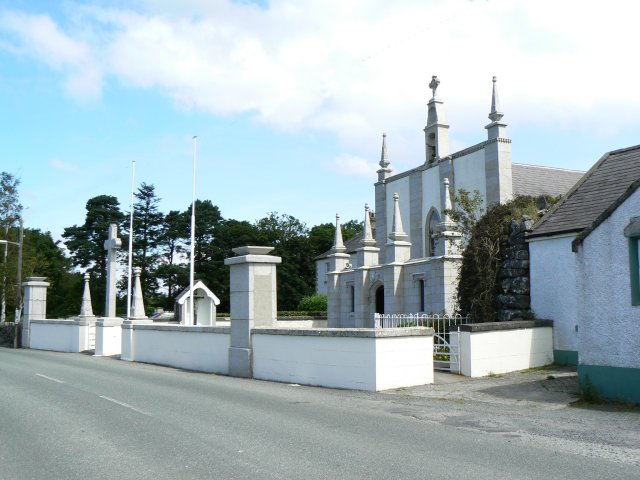
- St. Joseph's Catholic church

- Location in Ireland
- Coordinates: 53°06′21″N 6°31′30″W
- Country: Ireland
- Province: Leinster
- County: Wicklow
- Elevation: 198 m (650 ft)
- Time zone: UTC+0 (WET)
  - Summer (DST): UTC-1 (IST (WEST))
- Irish Grid Reference: N984072

Valleymount (Irish: Móin an Bhealaigh or An Chrois) is a small village in western County Wicklow, Ireland. The name 'Valleymount' does not appear before 1839. Previously, the village was known as 'the Cross of Ballymore' or simply 'the Cross', with 'cross' referring to land belonging to the church.

== Location and transport ==
Vallymount is located approximately 32km from Dublin city centre.

Valleymount is at an average elevation of 198m above sea level and is situated on the R758 regional road. The village is on a land spit created by the flooding of the River Liffey and its primary tributary the King's River in the late-1930s and early-1940s for the Poulaphouca Dam project. The Poulaphouca project now supplies water to the Greater Dublin Area, and electricity to the ESB national grid.

It is serviced by the Dublin Bus 65 route which connects to Dublin twice daily (Mon - Fri).

The Valleymount Spur of St Kevin's Way, the pilgrim route to the ancient monastery site at Glendalough runs through Valleymount village. Another spur runs from the nearby village of Hollywood to Glendalough.

Vallymount neighbours the villages of Hollywood, Ballymore Eustace, Blessington, Ballyknockan and Lacken.

== History ==
Neil 'Plunkett' Boyle, born at The Rosses in County Donegal in 1898, was shot at Knocknadroose aka Knocknadruce, near Valleymount on 15 May 1923 as part of the Irish Civil War. Boyle, who led the Anti-Treaty IRA in County Wicklow, was reputedly the last person to be killed as part of the conflict. He was 24. A granite stone marks the site of his execution at May Nolan's Cottage.

== Townlands ==
The townlands in the area of Valleymount include: Ballyknockan, (The) Togher, Monamuck, Valleymount (or Cross), Humphrystown, Lockstown Upper, Lockstown Lower, Baltyboys Upper, Baltyboys Lower, Rathballylong, Annacarney, Blackditches Upper, Blackditches Lower, Carrigacurra, Lugnagroagh, Tulfarris, Granabeg Upper, Granabeg Lower, Knocknadruce and Knocknadruce Upper. Nearby (to the NE) is the 'lost' townland of Ballinahown which was completely flooded by the Poulaphouca project in the late-1930s and early-1940s

== Built heritage ==
=== St. Joseph's Church ===
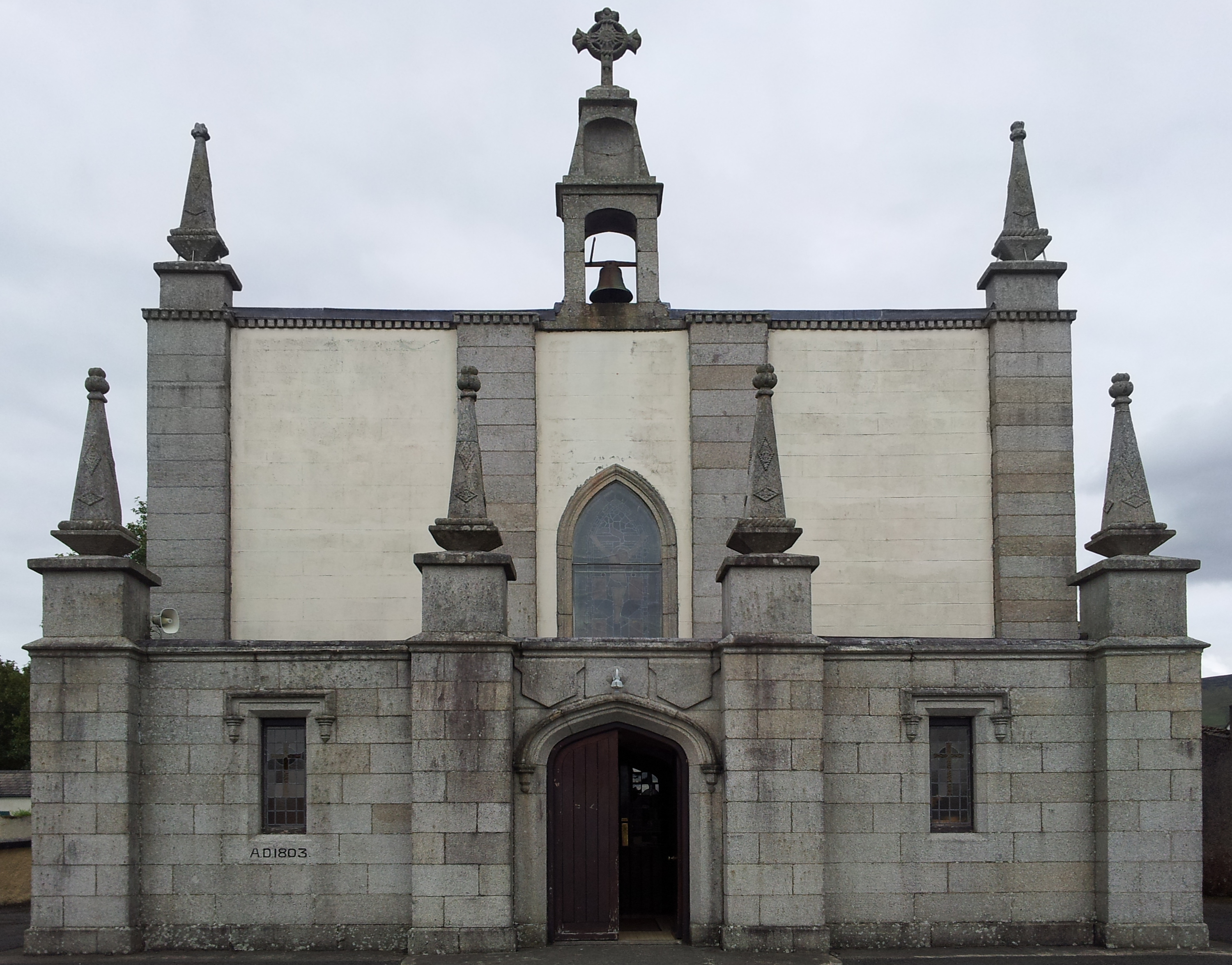
St. Joseph's church

The most notable building is St. Joseph's Catholic Church. Built in 1803, to which a porch extension was added around 1835, the 'Mexican style' of the church is attributed to design ideas brought home by Irish emigrants returning from New Mexico, and adapting the style to the local area. The church features stained glass windows by Harry Clarke, a leading figure in the Irish Arts and Crafts Movement and art students from Dublin's Art colleges sometimes visit the church to see the windows.

=== Star Inn ===
The pub was established around 1836, and changed owners. The current proprietor took over the family business in 1985 and refurbished the premises in 1996. The Inn is apparently named after the Morning Star that could be seen from the entrance.

=== Other notable buildings ===
Valleymount House is a stone building that was the village's one and only shop and post office until it closed in 2006.

The village also used to have its own forge which was active until the 1980s.

There is a prehistoric sweathouse in the townland of Annacarney near Valleymount.

== Sports ==
Honours won by Valleymount GAA club include the Intermediate Football Championship (1952,1964,1978,1989), Junior Football "A" Championship (1963,1998,2020), Minor Football Championship (1951), Junior Hurling Championship (1988), and Intermediate Hurling Championship (1989).

Rugby player Brian Carney played Gaelic football for Valleymount GAA and won a junior championship medal in 1998 with the club.

== Filming locations ==
The following films were made in or near Valleymount:

- The Outcasts (1982) includes a scene filmed by Cyril Cusack in the old forge (Tom Tipper's forge) in Valleymount (south of the Star Inn)
- Widows' Peak (1994) was filmed in the area, particularly in Ballyknockan
- Braveheart (1995) was partially filmed near Valleymount, and a route around the lake is called "Braveheart Drive"
- This Is My Father (1998), featuring Aidan Quinn and James Caan, was filmed around Valleymount, Hollywood and Kilteel in County Kildare
- P.S. I Love You (2007), starring Hilary Swank, saw some scenes filmed locally near Valleymount and in Ballyknockan

== People ==
- Jack Reynor (born 1992), Irish-American actor, grew up in Valleymount

== See also ==
- List of towns and villages in Ireland
