= Lacken, County Wicklow =

Village in County Wicklow, Ireland

Lacken An Leacain Lackan
- Townland
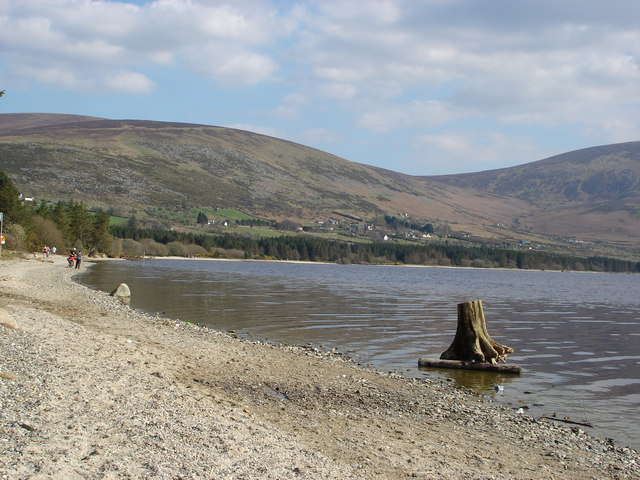
- View of Pollaphuca Reservoir from Lacken townland

- Location in Ireland
- Coordinates: 53°08′01″N 6°28′41″W
- Country: Ireland
- Province: Leinster
- County: County Wicklow

Population (2011)
  - Total: 200
- Time zone: UTC+0 (WET)
  - Summer (DST): UTC-1 (IST (WEST))
- Irish Grid Reference: O005111

Lacken or Lackan (Irish: An Leacain) is a townland and small village in the west of County Wicklow, Ireland, located on the shores of the Blessington lakes and western edge of the Wicklow Mountains.

Lacken in situated on the Blessington 'Lake Drive' and is sometimes noted for its view across the lake. The area has been used as a location for a number of films, including Dancing at Lughnasa (1998), This Is My Father (1999) and P.S. I Love You (2007).

As of the 2011 census of Ireland, the townland had a population of 200 people.

== History ==
=== Built heritage ===
Evidence of ancient settlement in the townland includes holy well, bullaun stone and ecclesiastical enclosure sites. The local Catholic church, Our Lady Of Mount Carmel church, is in the parish of Valleymount and was built in 1811.

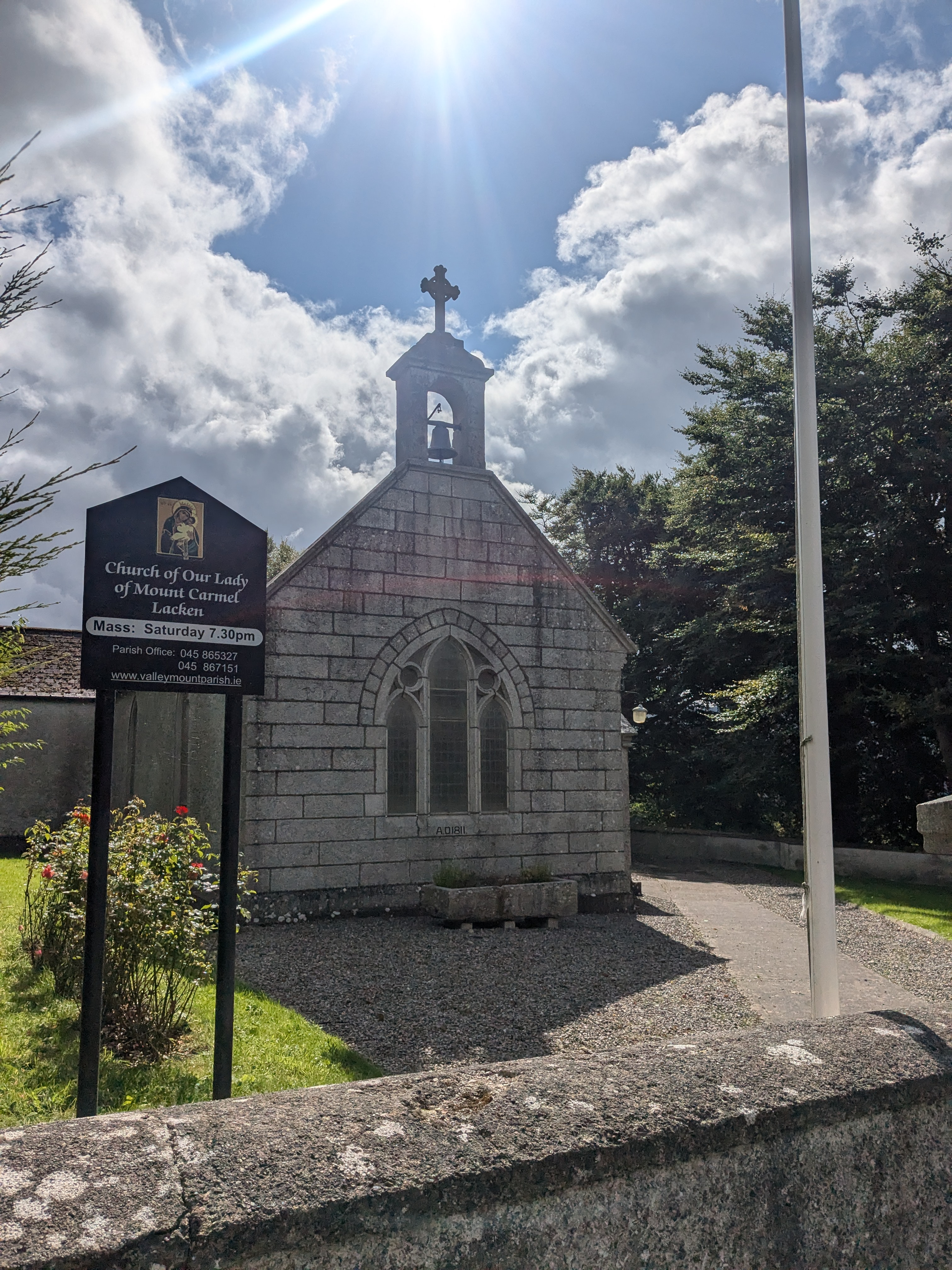
Church of Our Lady of Mount Carmel

A primary school was built in Lacken in 1869, and later converted to become a community centre. A new primary school was built and opened in January 2011, and (as of 2013) had an enrollment of 71 pupils.

A post office was opened in Lacken on 4 September 1951 as a sub-office to Blessington, but has since closed.

The route of the Art O'Neill Walk (later to become the Art O'Neill Challenge) from Dublin Castle to Glenmalure passes along the mountain ridge uphill of the village in the townland of Ballynulty. In an attempt of the walk in May 1952, nine walkers associated with the Na Fánaithe walking group descended the hill to attend mass in Lackan en route.

=== RAF crash ===
At approximately 04:34am on 18 April 1941, a Handley Page Hampden aircraft (Registration AD730) got lost in bad weather and crashed on nearby Black Hill (Kilbeg) killing its entire crew of four. All of the crew were under the age of 23.

The plane was one of seven aircraft which had departed RAF Lindholme, North Yorkshire the previous evening around 20.15pm on a bombing mission to Berlin. On the return leg, AD730 went missing. Lack of visibility, bad weather or failure of equipment due to technical or atmospheric problems have all been given as possible reasons for the plane going off course. The plane crashed in an almost inaccessible part of remote bog on Black Hill and it took searchers two days to find the remains of all four crew members. It appeared that death would have been instantaneous as the crew had not even been aware to put on parachutes. Full military funerals took place on Tuesday 22 April 1941 at St. Mary’s Church, Blessington, by order of the Irish Government. In attendance was a Mr. Leywood of the British Legation, who had arrived in Blessington on Sunday 20th and visited the scene of the crash. The Irish Times the day after reported that “During the funeral all shops in Blessington were closed and blinds drawn on windows.” A memorial stone was unveiled at the crash site on 18 April 1991 and the crew are remembered in the prayers of the congregation of St. Mary’s on every anniversary of the crash. The crew included wireless operator/gunner Sgt. Frederick Henry Erdwin, navigator Sgt. John Thompson Lamb, WOp/Gunner Sgt. Stanley Wright, and pilot officer John Kenneth Hill.

=== Mass path ===
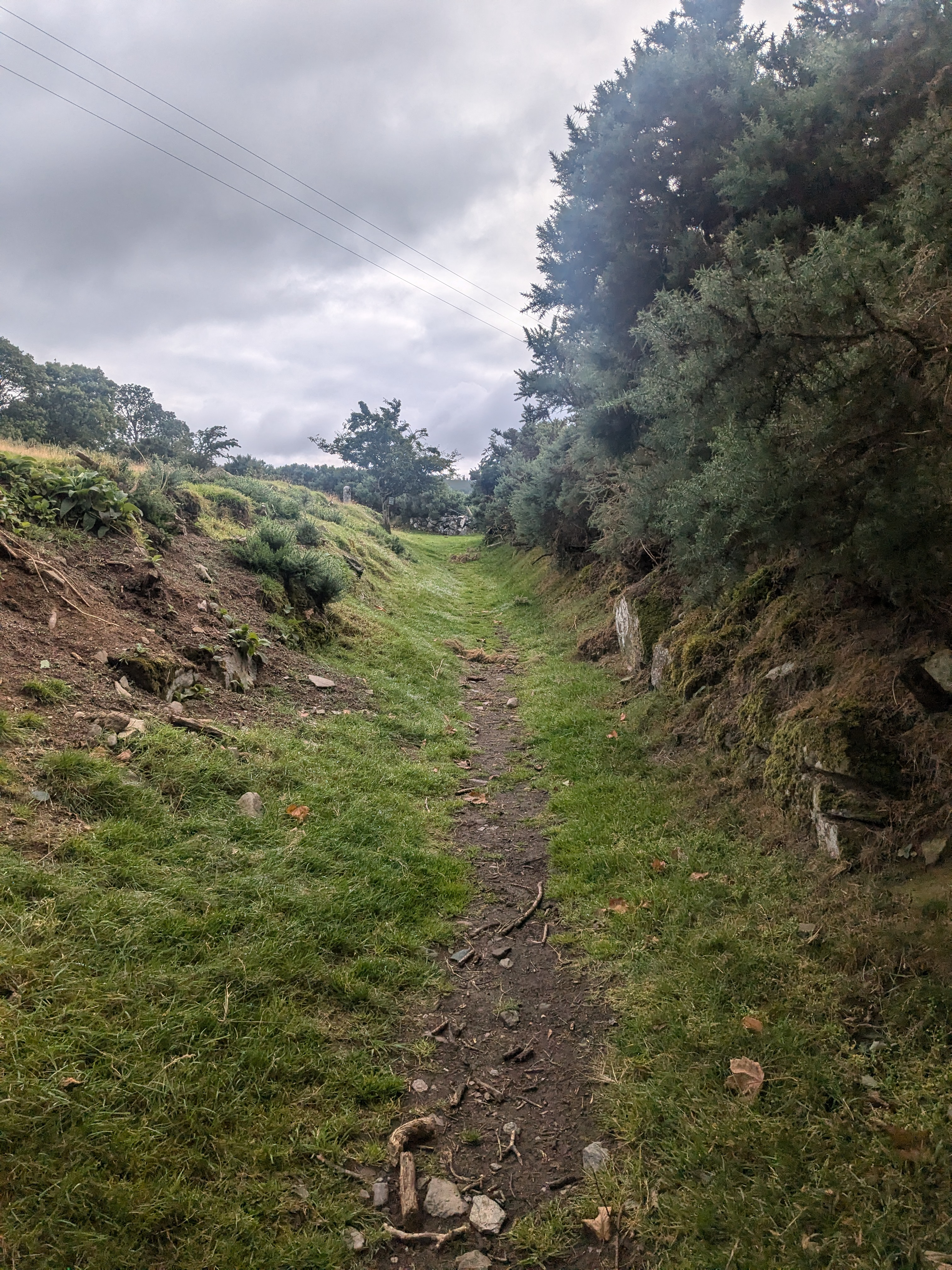
Lacken Mass Path

Lacken Mass path is a walking trail that is accessible from the village. The trail follows a signposted route to Lugnagun and unmarked tracks and Coillte forestry roads to Sorrel Hill and Black Hill.

== Filming location ==
The following films have been filmed, in part, in the Lacken area:

- Captain Boycott (1947)
- Dancing at Lughnasa (1998)
- This Is My Father (1999)
- P.S. I Love You (2007)

== See also ==
- List of towns and villages in Ireland
