= Poulaphouca Reservoir =

Pollaphuca Reservoir Taiscumar Pholl a' Phúca
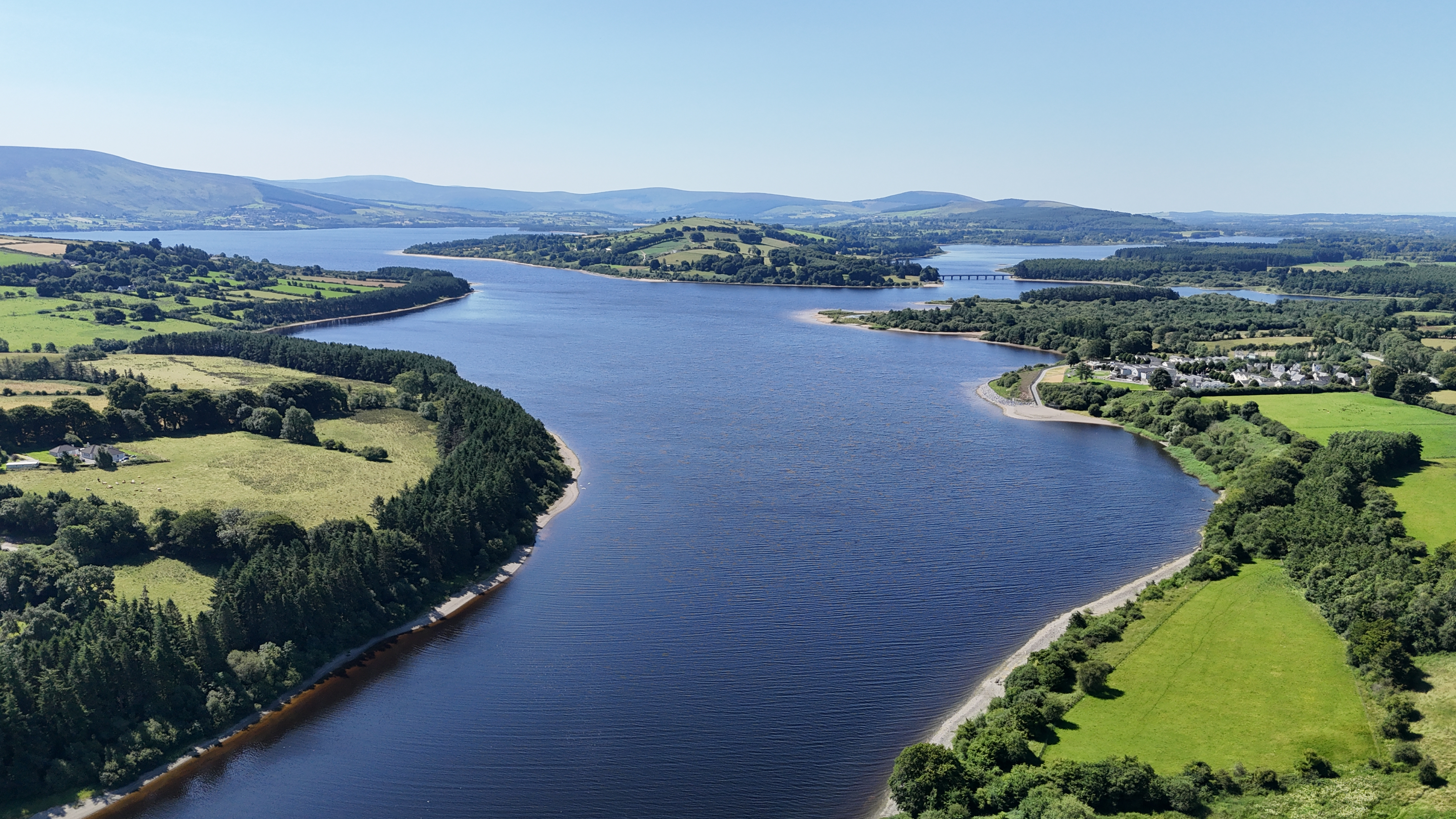
- The lake in summer 2025

- Location within Ireland
- Country: Ireland
- Location: County Wicklow
- Coordinates: 53°7′24″N 6°30′21″W
- Purpose: Water supply and hydroelectricity
- Status: In use
- Construction began: 1937
- Opening date: 1940
- Operator: ESB

Reservoir
- Total capacity: 166 billion litres
- Active capacity: 148 billion litres
- Surface area: 22.26 square kilometres (5,500 acres)

Power Station
- Installed capacity: 30 MW
- Website; ESB

Poulaphouca Reservoir, officially Pollaphuca (from Irish Poll a' Phúca, meaning 'the Púca's hole'), is an active reservoir (for both water supply and electricity generation) and area of wild bird conservation in west County Wicklow, Ireland named after the Poulaphouca waterfall on its south-western end where the water exits the lake. The lake is also commonly known as the Blessington Lakes, even though there is just one.

It holds 166 billion litres (43.8 billion gallons, or 0.2 cubic km) and has a surface area 22.26 km^{2}, making it the largest artificial reservoir in Ireland by capacity and surface area. It has a 44.3 km (27.5-mile) shoreline, and is 39.6 km (24.6 miles) from the sea.

== History ==
It was created between 1937 and 1947, with flooding beginning at 10:00 on 3 March 1940 by damming the River Liffey at Poulaphouca as part of the Electricity Supply Board project to build a second hydroelectric station in Ireland, Ardnacrusha on the River Shannon being the first.

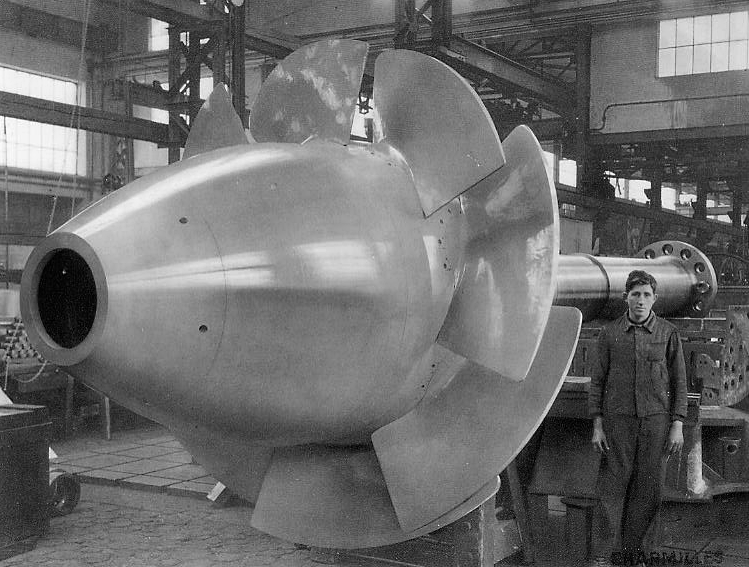
Kaplan turbine of the Poulaphouca power station

The reservoir is one of two major sources of Dublin's water supply, the other major supply being Vartry Reservoir in east Wicklow.

Between 1938 and 1940, 76 houses were demolished, and the bridges at Humphreystown, Baltyboys, and Burgage blown up, in anticipation of the flooding of the valley for the Poulaphouca hydroelectric power station.

In 1947, the recently flooded reservoir appeared in scenes of the film Captain Boycott, parts of which were filmed in the lakeside villages of Lacken and Ballyknockan.

== Technique ==
The Poulaphouca Reservoir supplies the three power stations along the River Liffey, which are located in Poulaphouca, Golden Falls and Leixlip. Poulaphouca has the largest capacity with two 15 MW generators driven by Kaplan turbines, the other two stations have a capacity of 4 MW each, so the total capacity of the power stations on the River Liffey is 38 MW.

The Kaplan turbines of the Poulaphouca station were delivered by the Swiss manufacturer Ateliers des Charmilles from Geneva, Switzerland. Each turbine has a capacity of 25,300 horsepower at a hydraulic head of 50.5 m. The contract was executed in collaboration with English Electric from London.

== Nature ==
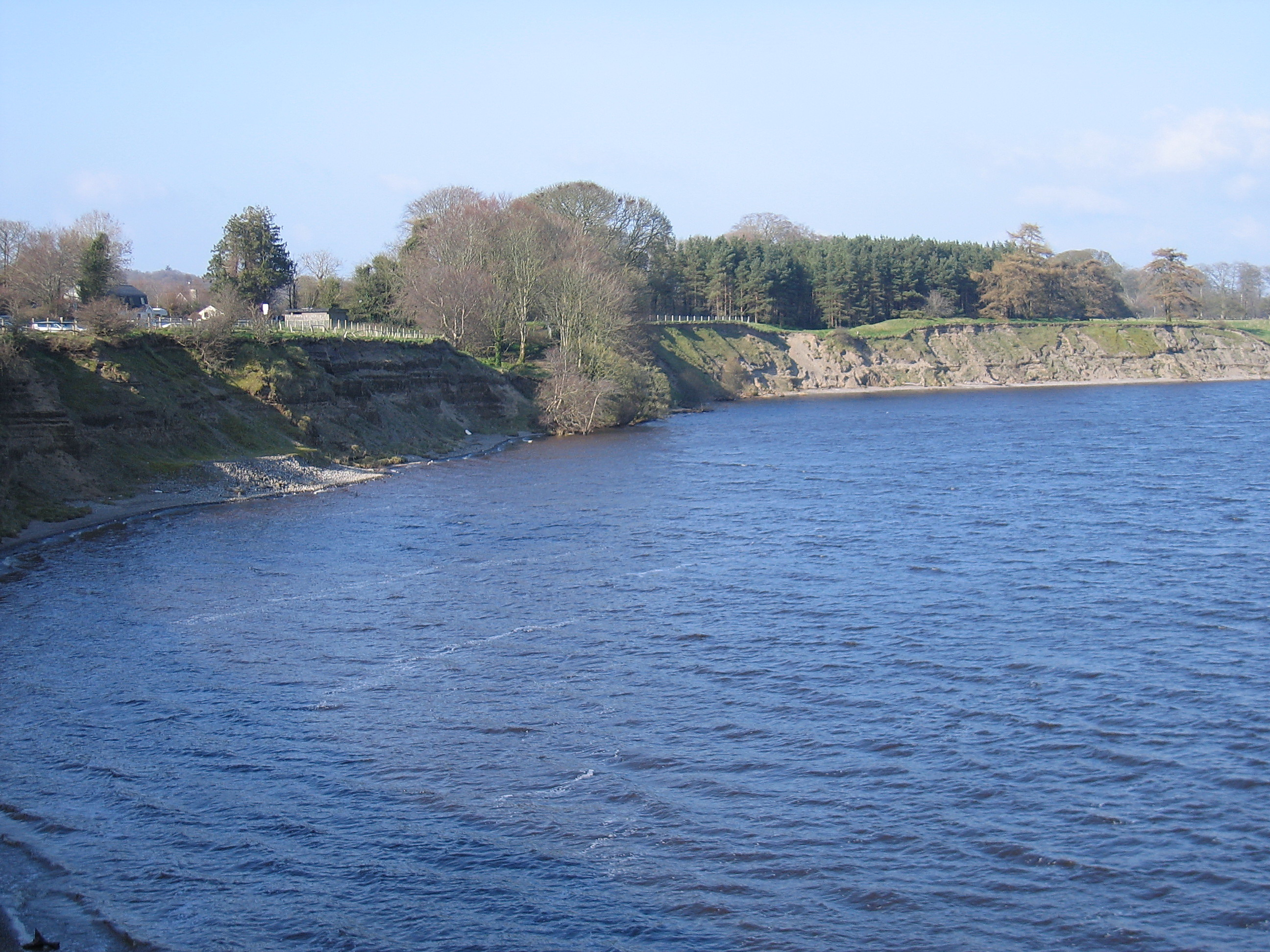
After 60 years the lakes had formed cliffs and beaches.

The reservoir is sometimes known as "lakes" due to its shape, which arises because it lies in not one but two river valleys - that of the Liffey and, primarily, that of the King's River. The King's River joined the Liffey at Baltiboys, at which point it was the larger flow, and when the Liffey was dammed upstream of the confluence, the King's River Valley was flooded far to the south.

A ridge of land, on which the village of Valleymount lies, divides the southern part of the reservoir.

The goosander, recently arrived as a breeding species in Ireland, can sometimes be seen here.

== Blessington Greenway ==
The Blessington Greenway walk is 6.5 km in length and links the historic town of Blessington with the Palladian mansion at Russborough House. The trail starts in Blessington village and leads south to the Avon Ri Activity Centre at the southern end of the town and weaves its way along the lake shores and forestry, crosses an ancient medieval Ringfort, and then uses the footpath along part of the N81 before turning back into the forest at Burgage Moyle lane. The Greenway follows the lakeshore and phase 2 is underway, with the goal of a 30 km greenway around the reservoir for walking, cycling and other recreational activities.

== Gallery ==
Map of Wicklow detailing the lake

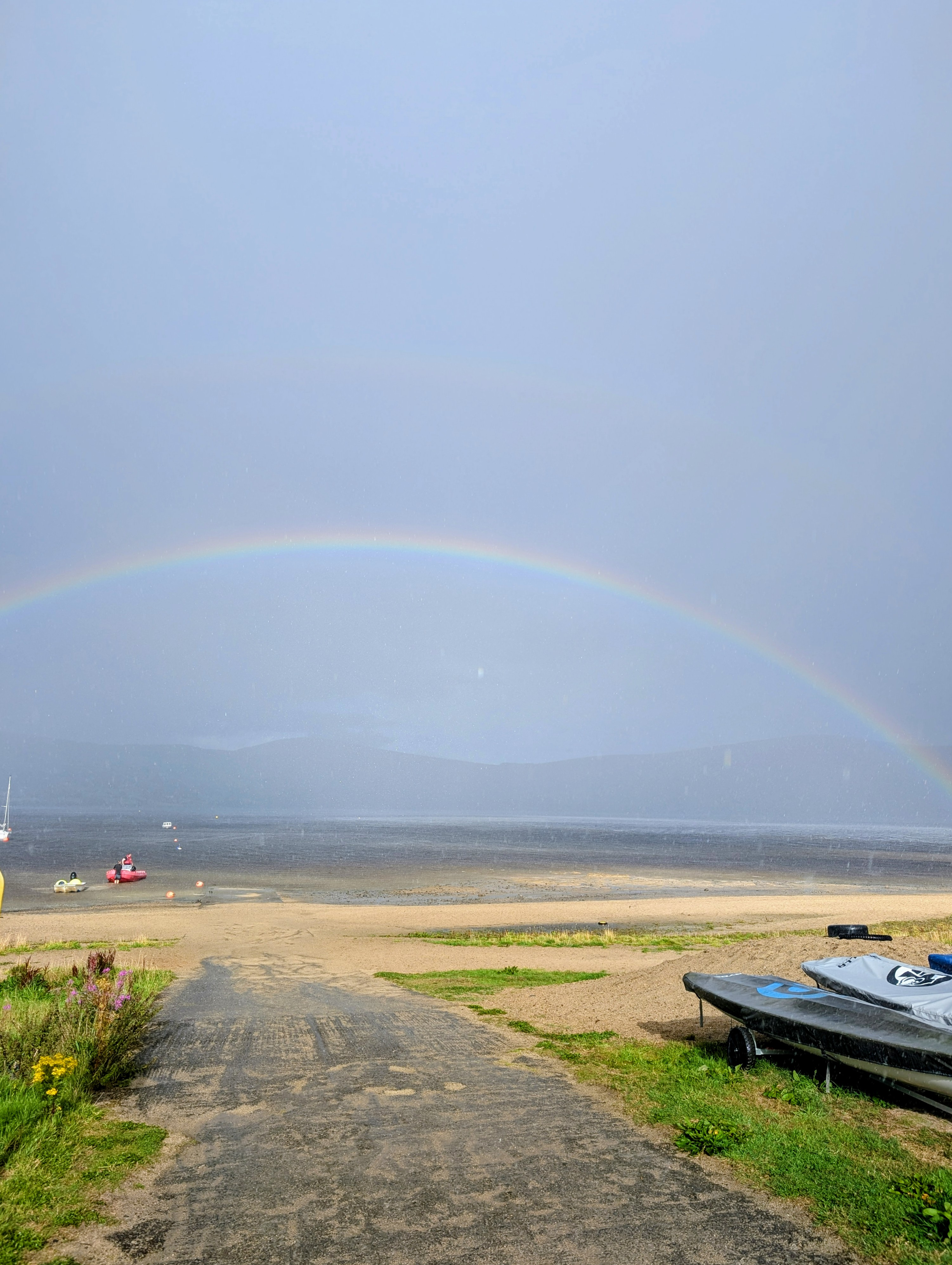
A rainbow over the lake, as seen from the Blessington Lake Sailing Club

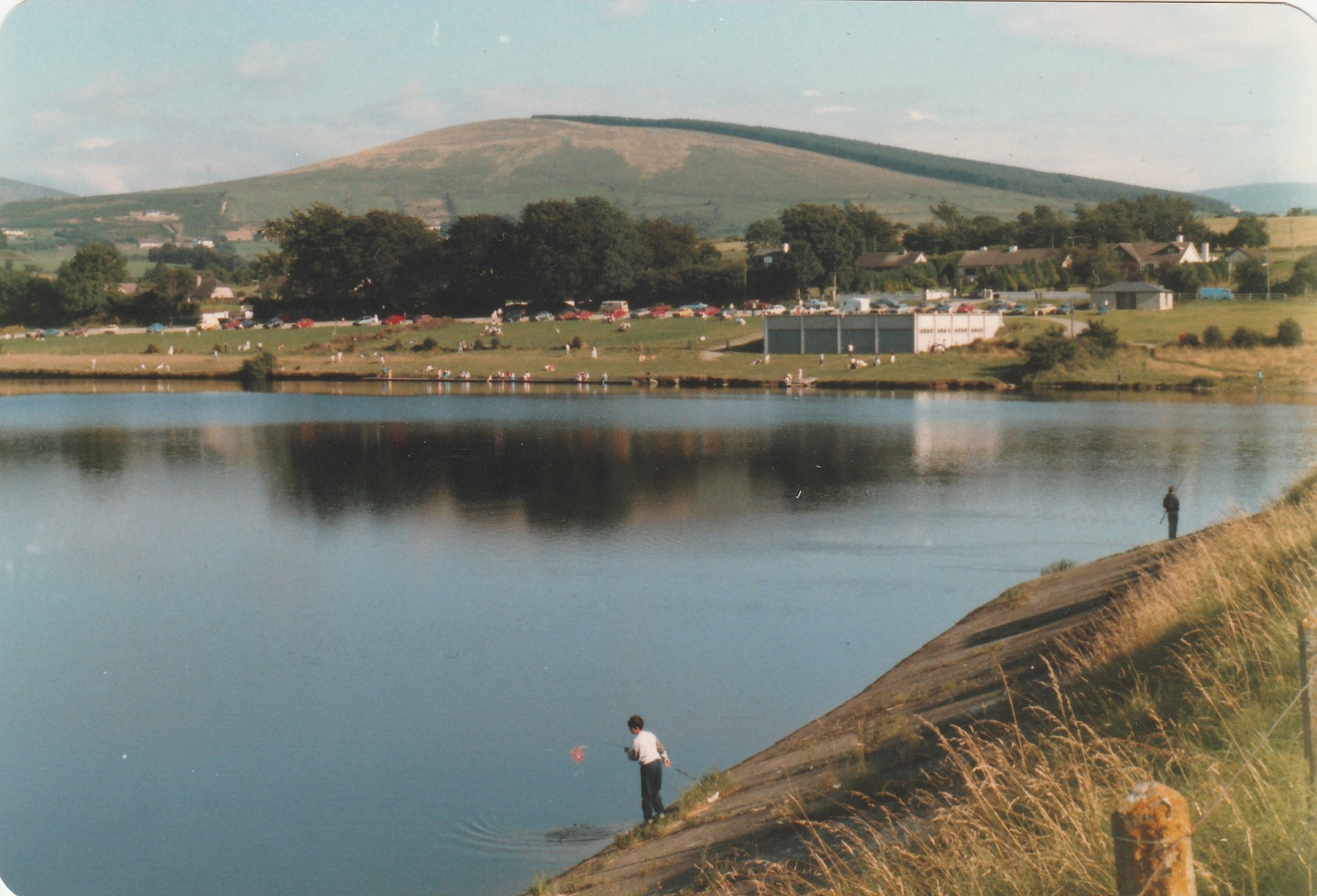
The lake in 1988

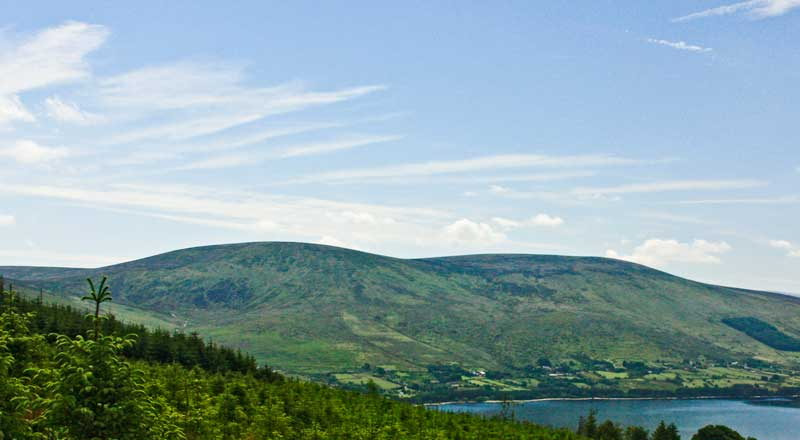
Moanbane hill overlooking the lake

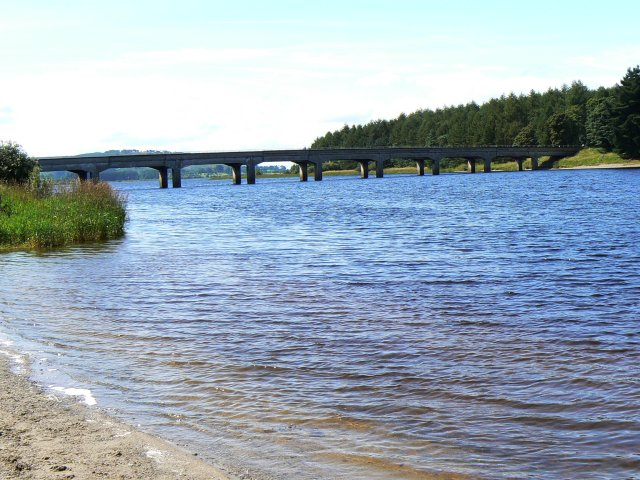
Baltyboys Lower Bridge crossing the lake

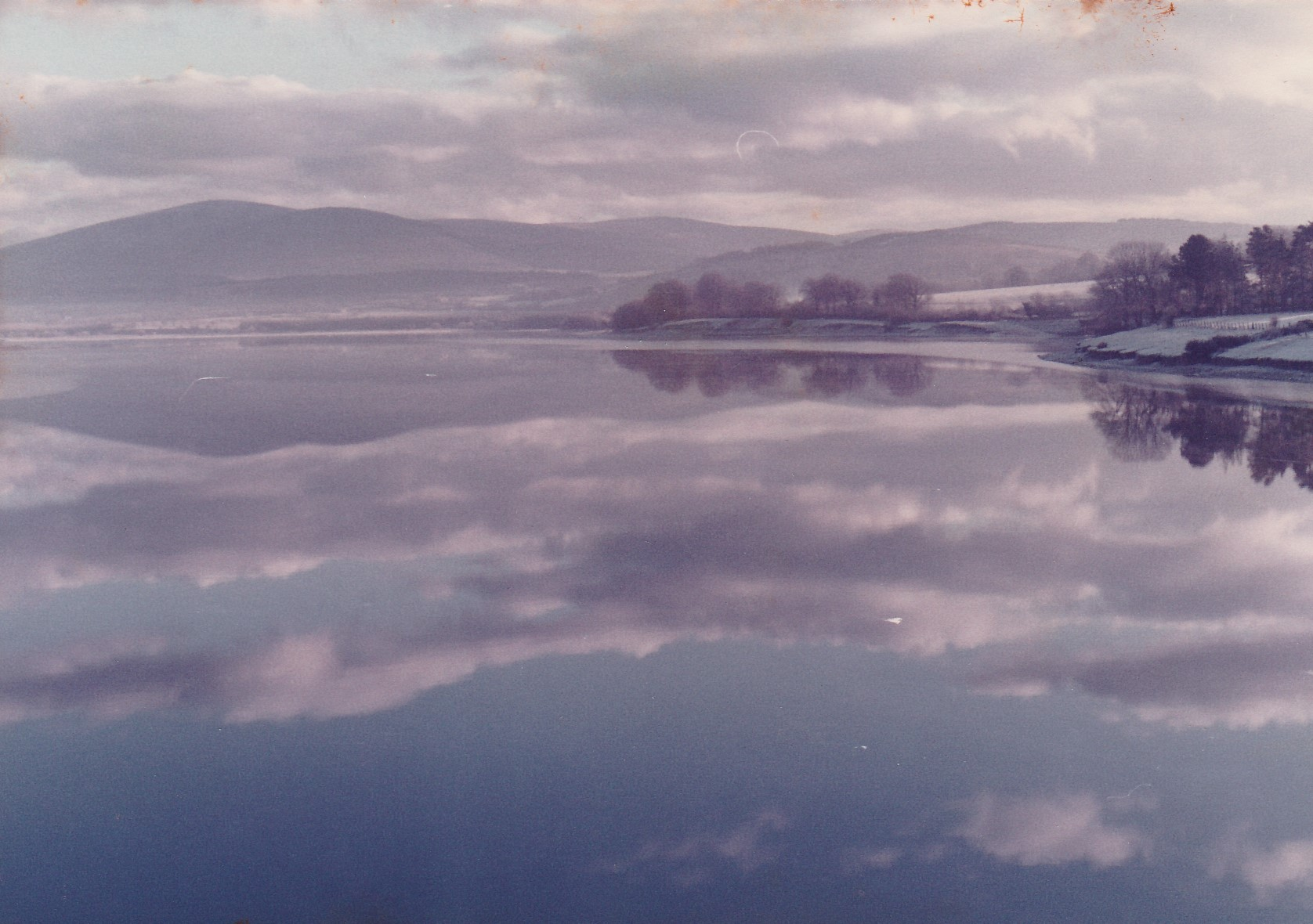
A frosty day by the lake

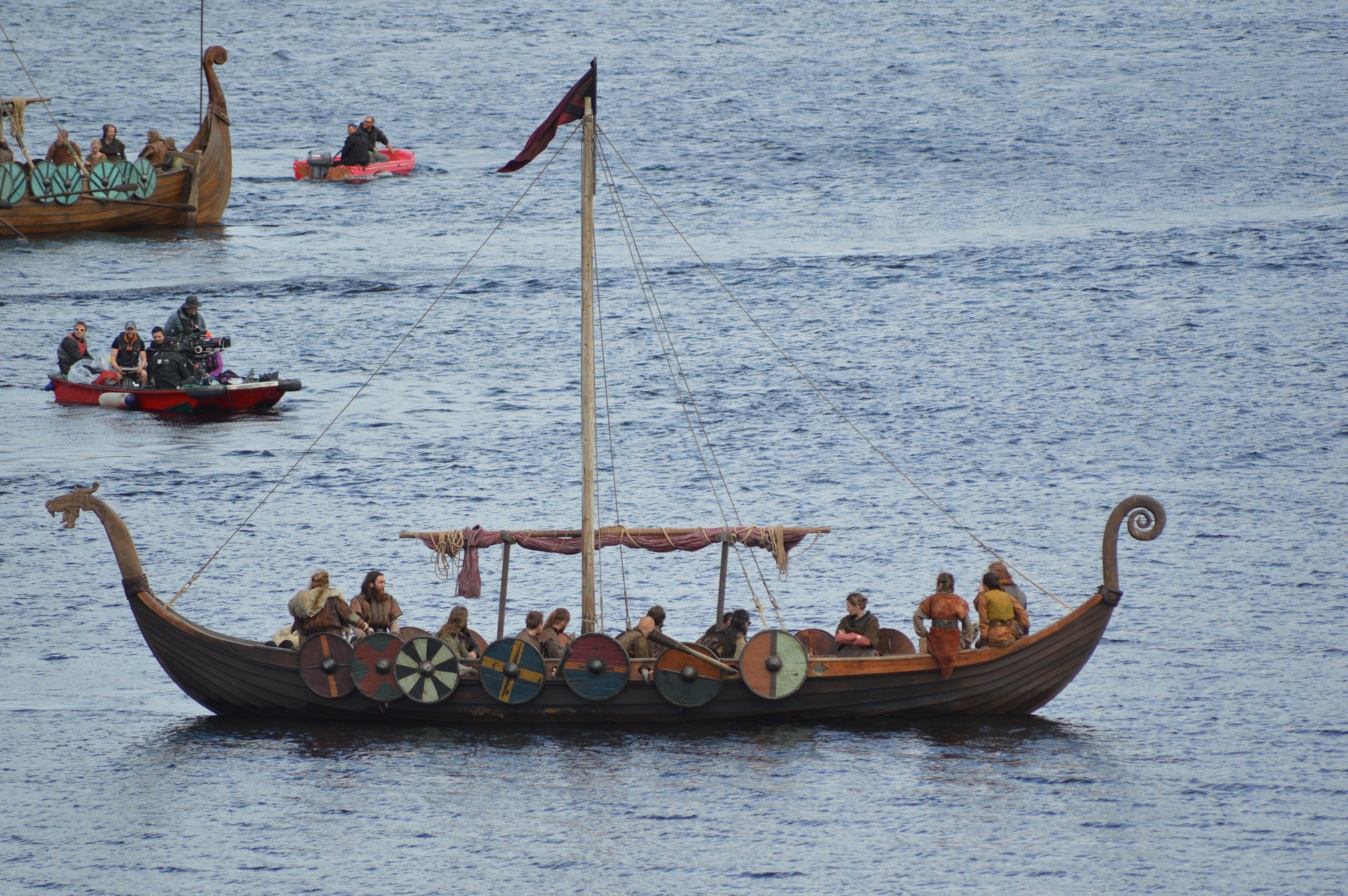
Filming for Vikings on the lake in 2015

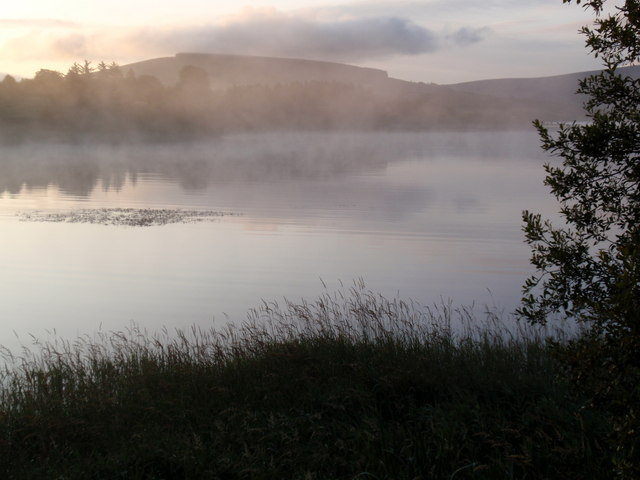
Mist on the lake

== See also ==
- Ardnacrusha power plant
- Carnsore Point
- Electricity Supply Board
- Blessington Sailing Club
