= Michael Boyle (archbishop of Armagh) =

Irish priest (c. 1609–1702)

The Right Reverend and Right Honourable Michael Boyle PC (Ire)
- Archbishop of Armagh; Primate of All Ireland
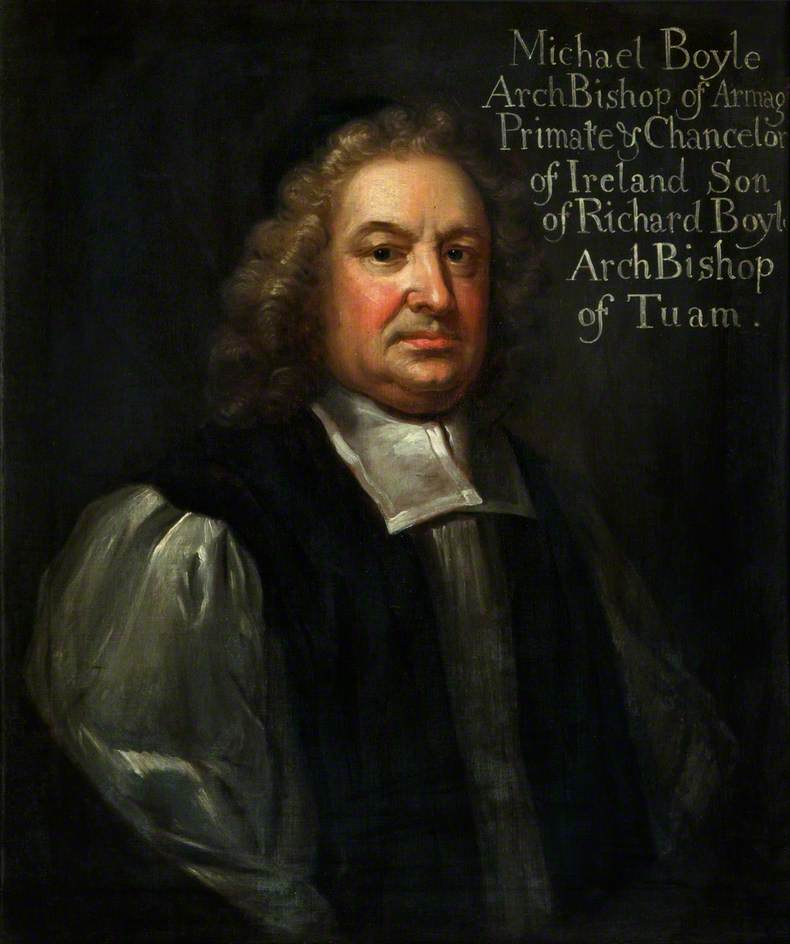
- Church: Church of Ireland
- Archdiocese: Armagh
- Appointed: 21 January 1679
- In office: 1679–1702
- Predecessor: James Margetson
- Successor: Narcissus Marsh
- Previous posts: Dean of Cloyne; Bishop of Cork, Cloyne and Ross; Archbishop of Dublin

Orders
- Consecration: 27 January 1661 by John Bramhall

Personal details
- Born: c. 1609
- Died: 10 December 1702 (aged 92–93)
- Denomination: Anglican
- Children: 7, including Murrough
- Education: Trinity College, Dublin

Michael Boyle, the younger (c. 1609 – 10 December 1702) was a Church of Ireland bishop who served as Archbishop of Dublin from 1663 to 1679 and Archbishop of Armagh from 1679 to his death. He also served as Lord Chancellor of Ireland, the last time a bishop was appointed to that office.

== Early career ==
Boyle was born circa 1609, the eldest son of Richard Boyle, Archbishop of Tuam and Martha Wright. His uncle was Michael Boyle (bishop of Waterford and Lismore). It was through the descendants of his first cousin once removed Richard Boyle, 1st Earl of Cork that the Boyle name became ennobled over the centuries with multiple peerages, including Earl of Cork, Earl of Orrery and Earl of Shannon.

Boyle was educated at Trinity College Dublin, where he proceeded M.A., and on 4 November 1637 was incorporated M.A. of Oxford. In 1637 he obtained a rectory in the diocese of Cloyne, received the degree of D.D., and became Dean of Cloyne in 1640. During the war in Ireland acted as chaplain-general to the English army in Munster.

In 1650, the Protestant royalists in Ireland employed Boyle, in conjunction with Sir Robert Sterling and Colonel John Daniel, to negotiate on their behalf with Oliver Cromwell. The Marquess of Ormonde resented the conduct of Boyle in conveying Cromwell's passport to him, which he rejected.

== Restoration ==
At the Restoration, Boyle became a member of the Privy Council of Ireland, and was appointed Bishop of Cork, Cloyne and Ross. In addition to the episcopal revenues, he continued to receive for a time the profits of six parishes in his diocese, on the ground of being unable to find clergymen for them. For Boyle's services in England in connection with the Irish Act of Settlement 1662, the Irish House of Lords at Dublin ordered a special memorial of thanks to be entered in their journals in 1662. Boyle was translated to Archbishop of Dublin in 1663, and appointed Lord Chancellor of Ireland in 1665. Though the appointment of a cleric as Lord Chancellor had previously been common, Boyle's was the last such appointment and it appears he was offered the position only because no professional lawyer of repute could be found to take it: the aged and ineffective Sir Maurice Eustace had remained in office as Chancellor until his death simply because of the difficulty in finding a suitable replacement. In the event Boyle proved to be a hard-working and incorruptible Chancellor, who earned the regard of successive Lord Lieutenants. While he undoubtedly used his influence to advance the career of his son-in-law, Sir William Davys, who was appointed Lord Chief Justice of Ireland in 1680, such use of patronage was an accepted part of seventeenth-century politics.

In 1675 Boyle was promoted from the see of Dublin to that of Armagh.

On the accession of James II, Boyle was briefly continued in office as Lord Chancellor, and appointed for the third time as Lord Justice, in conjunction with the Earl of Granard, and held that post until Henry, Earl of Clarendon, arrived as Lord Lieutenant of Ireland in December 1685. Clarendon had formed a very high opinion of Boyle, and is said to have objected to his dismissal from the Chancellorship, despite his lack of legal training, and his increasing infirmities, of both body and mind.

=== Blessington ===
In 1667, Boyle, then serving as the Archbishop of Dublin, bought the old Norman Lordship of the Three Castles in west Wicklow (as well as an estate in Monkstown, Cork) for £1,000. Both estates had previously belonged to the Cheevers, a County Meath Anglo-Norman family.

Boyle chose to live in his newly acquired Wicklow estate and was granted a royal charter to establish a new town there on a greenfield site, which he named Blessington – or Blesinton as it was more commonly referred to during the 1600-1800s. Planned to occupy the ancient townland of Munfine, the town was granted borough status and was to "extend into the said county of Wicklow every way from the middle of the said town two hundred or more acres in the whole". He started building Blessington House in 1673, and at his own expense also erected a church (St Mary's Church, Blessington), which he supplied with plate and bells. In connection with this town, in 1673 he obtained the title of Viscount Blessington for his only surviving son, Murrough Boyle.

== Last years ==
In Boyle's last years his faculties are stated to have been much impaired: "his memory gone, deaf and almost blind, a mere wreck of the past". After about 1683 he was unable to personally perform the functions of his office, and he stepped down as Lord Chancellor in 1686. He attended the brief Patriot Parliament called by James II in 1689. He died in Dublin on 10 December 1702, in his ninety-third year, and was interred in St. Patrick's Cathedral there. Little of the wealth accumulated by Boyle was devoted to religious or charitable uses. Letters and papers of Boyle are extant in the Ormonde archives at Kilkenny Castle and in the Bodleian Library. Portraits of Archbishop Boyle were engraved by Loggan and others.

== Family ==
He married firstly Margaret Synge, daughter of Rt. Rev. George Synge, Bishop of Cloyne and his first wife Anne Edgeworth: she died in a shipwreck in 1641, along with their infant daughter Martha. He married secondly Mary O'Brien, daughter of Dermod O'Brien, 5th Baron Inchiquin and Ellen FitzGerald. In addition to his son, who was created Lord Blessington, he had six daughters by his second marriage, named Elizabeth, Mary (who died young), Margaret, Eleanor, Martha, and Honora. Elizabeth married Denny Muschamp of Horsely, Surrey, the Muster Master-General for Ireland, and was the grandmother of John Vesey, 1st Baron Knapton. Margaret married Samuel Synge, Dean of Kildare, who was the elder brother of Edward Synge, Archbishop of Tuam. Eleanor married William Hill of Hillsborough: they were the parents of Michael Hill (1672-1699). Martha married Sir William Davys, Lord Chief Justice of Ireland. Honora married three times: firstly to Thomas Cromwell, 3rd Earl of Ardglass; secondly Francis Cuffe MP; and thirdly Sir Thomas Burdett, 1st Baronet, of Dunmore.

== Notes ==
Political offices
Preceded by Sir Maurice Eustace	Lord Chancellor of Ireland; 1665–1686	Succeeded by Sir Charles Porter
Church of Ireland titles
Preceded by James Margetson	Archbishop of Dublin; 1663–1679	Succeeded by John Parker
