= Blessington House =

Former country house in County Wicklow, Ireland

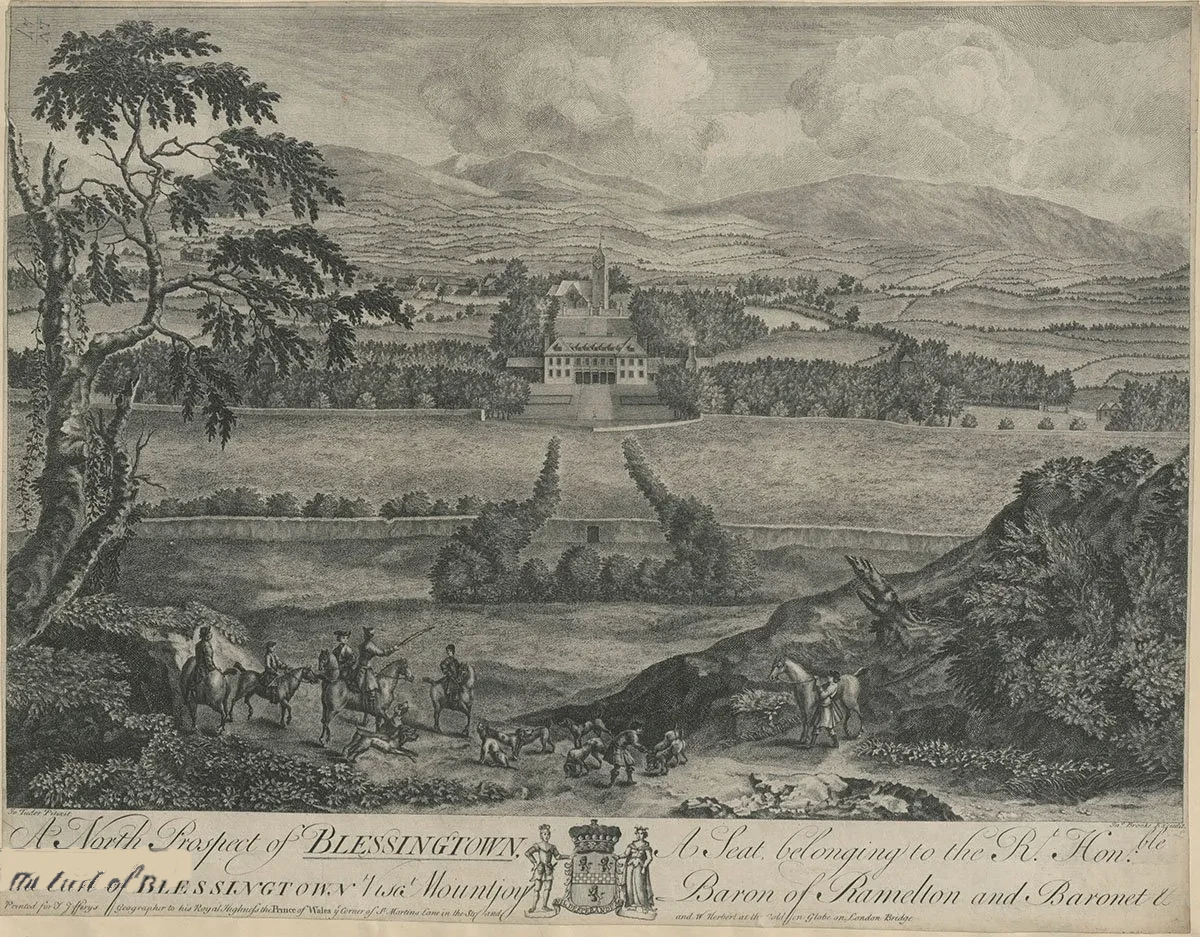
- A 1745 engraving of the house and grounds by Irish landscape artist Joseph Tudor

- Location within Ireland
- Alternative names: Downshire House

General information
- Status: Private dwelling house
- Type: House
- Architectural style: unknown
- Classification: Demolished
- Location: Blessington; County Wicklow, Ireland
- Coordinates: 53.174291°N 6.537954°W
- Construction started: 1673
- Estimated completion: unknown
- Renovated: c. 1785-1791
- Demolished: 1798, and in a ruinous state by the 1840s
- Cost: at least £1,900

Dimensions
- Diameter: 106 ft (32 m)
- Other dimensions: 61 feet wide, with walls at least 10 feet high

Technical details
- Material: lime, stone, brick and sand
- Floor count: two storeys (above a wine cellar) with a dormered attic in a high-pitched roof. Five-bay centre recessed between two, three-bay projecting wings joined by a balustraded colonnade

Design and construction
- Architects: Thomas Lucas (original) and Charles Lilly (renovation)
- Developer: Michael Boyle

Blessington House, Blessington Manor, the Manor House of Blessington, or Downshire House (post-1789), was a large estate house in Blessington, County Wicklow, Ireland built in 1673, and destroyed during the 1798 Rebellion. It was never rebuilt.

== History ==
=== Background ===
In 1667, Michael Boyle, then serving as the Church of Ireland Archbishop of Dublin, bought the old Norman Lordship of the Three Castles in west Wicklow (as well as an estate in Monkstown, Dublin) for £1,000. Both estates had previously belonged to the Cheevers, a County Meath Anglo-Norman family.

Boyle chose to live in his newly acquired Wicklow estate and was granted a royal charter to establish a new town there on a greenfield site, which he named Blessington - or Blesinton as it was more commonly referred to during the 1600-1800s. Planned to occupy the ancient townland of Munfine, the town was granted borough status and was to "extend into the said county of Wicklow every way from the middle of the said town two hundred or more acres in the whole".

Boyle encouraged farmers of the Protestant faith to settle on the estate, as was the case in most large landed estates of the period. Regular Thursday markets were established, and to encourage settlement, the town was to be a free borough, possessing a sovereign, two bailiffs and twelve burgesses. It would also have the right to send two burgesses (M.P.s) to every parliament in Dublin. Historian Jim Corley, writing in the Journal of the West Wicklow Historical Society, gives an overview of Boyle's dominance over the estate in its early years:

His Lordship fenced off his deerpark, and built an imposing mansion on it. No-one could hunt there without his permission, excepting only the Lord Chancellor. He appointed bailiffs to protect his deer from poachers. His fishing and hawking rights were protected likewise. Guilty poachers would be tried by his court, fined or put in prison. He erected (at least up-dated) the mill race and corn mill on the Liffey. Grain growers were obliged to have their crop ground at the Lord's mill, or face heavy fines. Waifs, strays, felons and fugitives were severely dealt with, often being whipped out of the area. He had pigeon houses on his Manor. All mines were his sole possession (..) He would subsidise and supervise the local inn. He would look after street lighting and cleaning. He would contribute to bridge and road building.

=== Construction ===
In 1673, construction began on the brick mansion of Blessington House, to designs by Dublin architect and carpenter Thomas Lucas. Lucas had previously worked on St Patrick's Cathedral, Dublin and on the original west front of Trinity College Dublin, which was eventually demolished in the 1750s. Lucas is known to have remained in Boyle's employment during 1673 and 1674.

According to Phibbs, the method of payment to the builder was agreed thus: "£100 in hand, £100 when the first storey was set, £100 when the walls were ready for the roof and the last payment made when the work was completely finished". The work was to be carried out "exactly according to the draught of the same house made by said Lucas" and the agreements made between Boyle and his contractors specified that the two-storied house, built of lime, stone, brick and sand, was to be 106 feet long, 61 feet wide, with walls at least 10 feet high and a cellar 60 feet long and 28 feet wide.

The building had a recessed centre at the back, eight dormers on the roof, and typical of many houses of the period was designed to have its principal rooms on the first floor, according to the piano nobile architectural principle. In front of the house was a large circular pond.

Lucas was also tasked with designing the interior of the house, while a Dublin mason named Thomas Browne was assigned with carrying out all masonry work. Lucas's contract was for £1,300 and Browne was to be paid £600, but additional expenses and furnishings ended up adding considerably to the cost. Construction of such a large building was a huge financial undertaking and consequently Boyle, as Chancellor, sought from Thomas Osborne, the Lord High Treasurer, an increase in his salary from £2,000 to £3,000 per annum. According to Trant, it is unclear what the result of this request was.

=== Landscaping ===
The demesne and deer park, luxuriously planted with a variety of trees, extended to over 440 Irish acres, with the deer park covering 340 acres of this. Boyle had to be personally granted a license by King George II for the enclosed deer park. By 1684, the lands were described in an Abstracts of Grants of Lands as "now inclosed with a wall about the deer park".

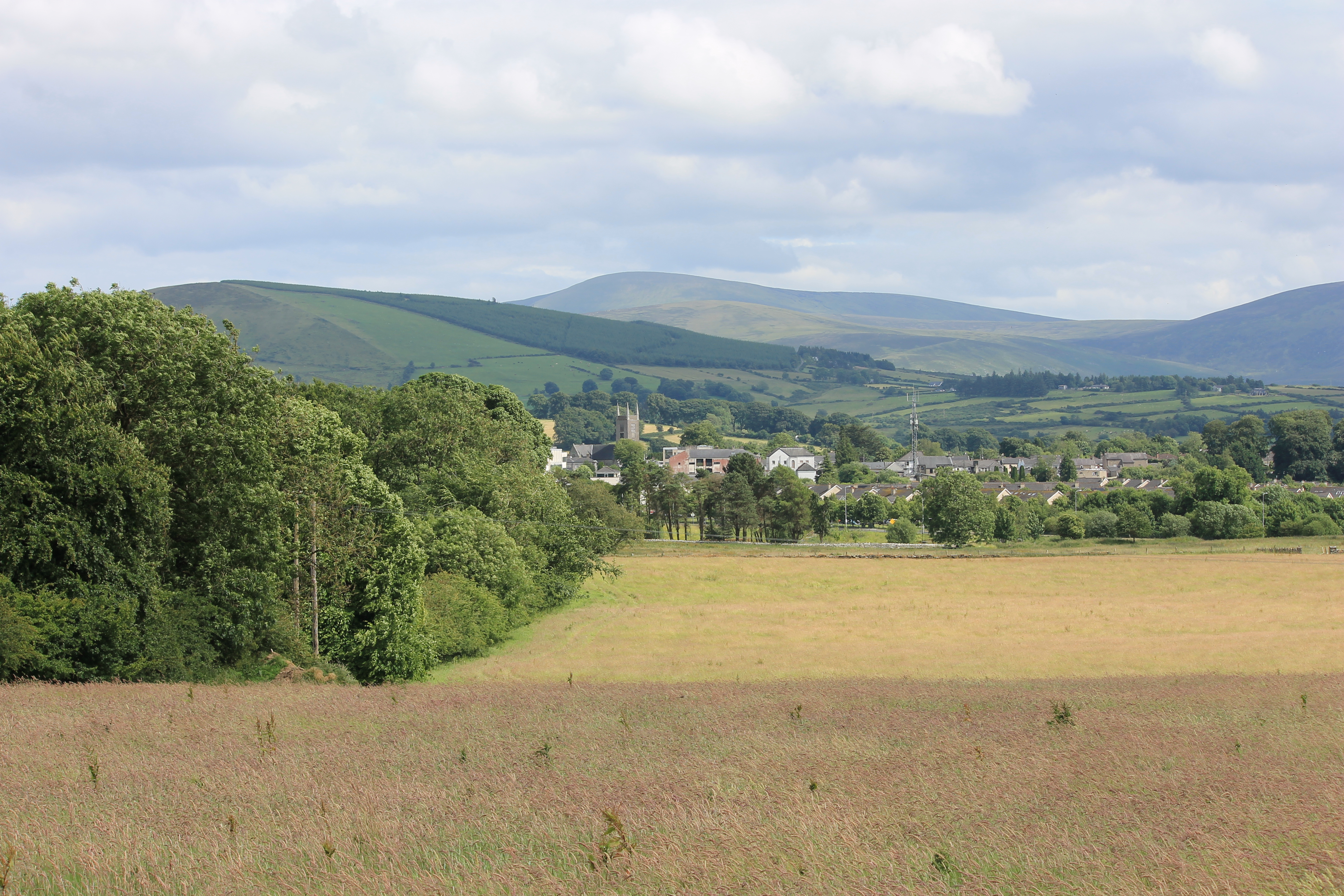
A view of Saint Mary's Church clocktower from the north of Blessington (summer view), roughly corresponding to Tudor's 1745 engraving

The landscaping on the estate was typical of the seventeenth century, with ponds, canals and a formal garden, which all converged on the house at the apex of a crow's foot pattern. There were lawns between the various avenues and a double line of lime trees planted either side of the major avenue between the front of the house and St Mary's Church. A pair of gate piers from the avenue, as well as one of the original lime trees, remain standing as of 2026.

The principal avenue from the front of the house linked it directly with St Mary's Church in the centre of Blessington, and was an avenue still extant by 2004, before roadworks largely changed the area with the construction of the Blessington ring road. Traces of the other avenues could also still be seen in the landscape as of 2004.

=== Appraisal ===
In 1709, the house was described thus by Samuel Molyneux, a visitor to Blessington:

"About Blessingtown ye lands is very mountainous and wild, yet here ye late Lord Primate Boyle chose to build one of ye finest seats in Ireland. It is now enjoyed and kept in good order by his son the Lord Blessingtown. Ye house and furniture are very great and beautiful particularly the chapel, all manner of conveniences, handsome noble garden, wilderness, green house, fish ponds, a noble large park and paddocks, and is in short much beyond any seat in all respects that I have seen in this Kingdome, and as I am told would make no bad figure in England".

The modern historian Maurice Craig agreed that Boyle's mansion "must have been among the very finest" of the wide-eaved houses typical of the period.

Trant notes that Blessington House would have been similar to in style to another mansion built by Archbishop William Bulkeley about forty years earlier (1620s), at Old Bawn, Tallaght, not far from Blessington. These types of dwelling, according to Trant, "with extensive windows and spacious interior, had replaced the earlier tower houses of the fifteenth and sixteenth centuries, which had been built mainly with defence in mind". This new style of house, however, was a sign of the growing security felt by settlers as the seventeenth century progressed.

=== Usage ===
When Boyle had completed Blessington House, he turned his attention to the construction of a church for the town; St Mary's, which was eventually dedicated on 17 September 1683 with Boyle in attendance. The church still stands, and was still in use as of June 2024.

It is unclear how often Boyle used his Blessington mansion. It is known that he was residing there in 1678, the same year he was promoted to the See of Armagh, and was "taking a little air, as physic to prepare more against the next term" whilst also taking care of business matters.

=== Boyle's final years ===
In 1689, James II landed at Kinsale with a force of 2,500 men which led to the country being "in ferment". Shortly afterwards, Blessington was attacked by "a horde of wandering rapparees" and Blessington House plundered. According to Trant, the word 'rapparee' in interchangeable with 'tory', and the rapparees in question were most likely the Wicklow clanns of the O'Byrnes and O'Tooles. A detachment of dragoons was positioned in the town for security, and Boyle himself sought refuge across the Irish Sea in Chester. Boyle's first wife Margaret Synge, along with their child Martha were drowned at sea as they fled the 1641 Rebellion some decades earlier.

In July 1690, William of Orange won a decisive victory over James II at the Battle of the Boyne. One of William's Dutch generals, Ginkle, continued in Ireland afterwards and had a detachment of French troops (probably Huguenots fighting with the Dutch) quartered in Blessington House. This complement consisted of fourteen or fifteen troopers with their horses in the stables, and a commanding officer in the house. Boyle reported that they were more "formidable" than the dragoons who had been there before them, and "hath put the place and people" into a "quiet". The officer in charge assured Boyle that 'a tickett' would be given for any hay or oats used by his men, and that the troopers would be "banned from going into the park or doing any disturbances to the deer or any [of] my stock upon the place, that no young trees or hedges in the demesne would be cut down and that Boyle's labourers would not be interfered with".

Boyle's largest sitting tenant was one John Finnemore of Ballyward near the village of Manor Kilbride, whose presence in Blessington was first recorded in the year 1683 in entries from the 'vestry books' of St. Mary's Church. On 20 May 1700, Murrough Boyle, son of Michael, granted Sarah Finnemore of the town of Blessington, a lease of the townland of Ballyward, demonstrating that Murrough was at least partly in control of affairs on the estate at that point, and not his father.

Michael Boyle died at his home in Oxmanstown, Dublin in December 1702, and was buried in St Patrick's Cathedral, Dublin.

=== Boyle descendants ===
Upon his death, Boyle's eldest son Morough inherited his fathers various estates. Morough's interest in the Blessington estate is unclear, but the fact that Monsieur Gilmud, Morough's chaplain, died in the town in 1710 would suggest that Morough lived at Blessington House, at least for a time.

With Morough's death in 1718, and no male heir, the titles Baron Boyle and Viscount Blessington became extinct, and the estates in Blessington and Monkstown devolved to his sister Anne. When Anne's son William Stewart died in 1769, also without a male heir, the Blessington title became extinct once more, and all the Boyle estates went to Charles Dunbar, a grandson of Morough's daughter Mary.

During this time, other large country estates began to appear in the immediate surroundings of Blessington, including Russborough House, built four kilometres away from Blessington between 1741 and 1755. The houses of the minor gentry, such as the Smiths at Baltyboys House, the Hornidges at Tulfarris and Russelstown and the Finnemores at Ballyward, were on a more modest scale than Russborough, but still not insignificant.

A lease from 1732, for 1,050 acres in the townland of Ballylow, a semi-mountainous area within the Blessington estate, demonstrates the conditions which tenants (in this case the Finnemores) were expected to satisfy. As was the system at the time, the Finnemores, upon being granted their lease, would divide the land into smaller parcels, which they would then sub-lease on to smaller tenants. It is worth noting that the Blessington estate included much underdeveloped heath land and the Finnemores and their tenants were expected to improve their holdings during the course of the lease. The conditions of the 1732 lease were listed as the following:

- Rent was £30 per annum to be paid at Blessington House.
- Finnemore was to erect good ditches and 2 rows of quicksets between himself and his neighbours.
- Pay a duty hogg and 2 capons at Christmas.
- Do suite and service at the Manor Courts of Blessington.
- Grind their corn and mault, to be used for bread and drink, at the Manor Mill of Blessington.
- Sow hemp and flax according to the law.
- Permission for John Pearson to enter the lands to deliver livery and seizen – a legal requirement.
- Keep ditches and buildings in good repair.
- Rear one couple of young hounds or beagles yearly for his Lordship.

In 1760, Blessington House was "burned and almost levelled" in an attack which was described: "the Downshire mansion at Blessington was broken into about two in the morning while the men who should have been guarding it were absent drinking in the town".

In 1778, Dunbar also died heirless. In his will, he had reiterated the wishes of his great-grandfather, Morough Boyle, that the estate should continue "in the family and blood of the late Primate Boyle". The estates were thus divided amongst Boyle's descendants, with the Blessington estate coming into the possession of Wills Hill, 1st Marquess of Downshire.

=== Downshire renovation ===
By the time Hill inherited the Blessington estate in 1778, both the house and demesne were neglected. Hill aimed to reverse the downward trajectory of the estate, and under a writ granted by George III, restored Blessington's corporation, styled as The Sovereign, Bailiffs, and Burgesses of the Borough and Town of Blessington. In July 1781, an election to the newly formed corporation was held, with members installed.

Blessington House was viewed by Hill as an ideal location for a summer house, or to be used as little more than a rural hunting lodge, from his homestead in Hillsborough, County Down. He aimed to refurbish the building for these purposes and employed the builder and architect Charles Lilly, who had also been employed on Hillsborough Castle and Downpatrick Cathedral. Between 1785 and 1786, as many as twelve men were employed to bring materials to the house from Dublin, including slates and deal boards.

At the initial stages, much of the work was focused on the stables and the demesne, employing a large number of the residents of the town. James Ivers repaired the roof, for which he received £4.14s for forty seven days work. Other labourers included Willim Twyford (who repaired the coping for which William Tassie supplied the cut stone), Alex Bourke (who fitted glass in the stables, barn and wool room), two men by the name of Doran and Quinn (who repaired the demesne wall), and Edward Kelly, a 'lymeburner', (who supplied 189 hogsheads of lime). Various other jobs were carried out by skilled tradesmen, as described by Trant:

"Alex Bourke's horse was hired for three days to remove rubbish. Bourke also carried out the glazing in the upper chapel room, bedchamber, housekeeper's room, pantry and laundry. John Nowlan repaired the bells in the main reception rooms, including the great hall, the big parlour, the drawing and breakfast rooms, as well as various bedchambers. Extensive plumbing work was also undertaken and included installing water closets, while a locksmith, Richard Homan, had the task of securing the house"

Despite Hill's works, the general state of the building as a whole was still a cause for concern by this stage, after decades of intermittent use. In November 1786, William Greene, one of Hill's employees, visited Blessington and reported back to Hillsborough on the repairs taking place, noting that "the rain came several times in great plenty after every high wind that blew while I was there, and only by a weekly expense to the roof was the rain kept from ruining the mansion". Greene went so far as to say that the roof would not stand another winter.

Hill put more money into the house and by 1791 redecorating was in progress; "'42 dozen sattin ground tabby paper' and a border to match at a cost of almost £12 had been bought and £1.16s was spent on 'twice colouring the parlour'". Original drawings by the Dublin stuccodore Michael Stapleton exist detailing designs he made for the Marquis of Downshire's Dining Parlour (probably for Blessington House) from the 1770s-80s.

=== 1790s ===
Will Hill died in 1793, and was succeeded by his son Arthur Hill, 2nd Marquess of Downshire, inheriting some 10,500 Irish acres (17,000 statute acres) as part of the Blessington estate, although his Ulster estates were much larger. At that time, the Hill family were among the wealthiest landowners in Ireland as well as England, and Arthur had also married one of the richest women in the British Empire; Mary Sandys. Despite this wealth, Arthur Hill had difficulties meeting his financial responsibilities and Charles Lilly, the builder involved with the refurbishment of Blessington House, was pressing for the £800 due for works on same.

Despite not taking a great interest in his estate in Blessington, throughout his tenure Arthur Hill was regarded by his tenants as a good and fair landlord who left the day to day running of his estate to his estate manager. It was during Arthur's tenure that Blessington House would be destroyed.

=== Lead up to 1798 Rebellion ===
At the end of the eighteenth century, agrarian secret societies began to form consisting of citizens, mostly Catholic, who resented the fact they had been dispossessed of their lands and had been forced into life as smallholders under the Protestant Ascendancy, which Boyle and the Hills represented. The first indication of disaffection in the Blessington area occurred in 1796 when the local inhabitants refused to bring provisions or supply turf to the troops stationed in Russborough House.

View of Blessington main street from the tower of Saint Mary's Church, used by yeomanry in 1798

A division of yeomanry controlled by the local estate owners based in Blessington served to defend the British ethos as represented by the landed gentry and maintain their wealth and position. The yeomanry used St Mary's Church as an auxiliary barracks, and utilised the church spire as a defensive position.

In August 1797, a spy working for Dublin Castle, William McCormack, infiltrated the local branch of the United Irishmen and was going to give evidence against them at the county assizes. To prevent him from doing so, "two to three hundred local men rushed into the town (Blessington) brandishing pikes and muskets" and surrounded his house, where he was in the protective custody of the Blessington yeomanry. The yeomenry, headed by Richard Hornidge of Tulfarris and William Patrickson, were heavily outnumbered and unable to protect him, and McCormack was summarily dragged from his home and murdered. A report in Faulkner's Dublin Journal stated that "he was dragged from the arms of his family, alleging he was an informer, and was murdered in a cruel manner, which only the diabolical ingenuity of the United Irishmen could devise, severing the head from the body and tearing the limbs apart".

This may be the same account as that recounted in "Welcome to the Granite City: A Social History of Ballyknockan" in which local men from the parish of Blackditches came to Blessington and fought against the yeomen to secure the death of a notorious informer known as the "Big Sweep" who had informed on men hiding out in the cave between Black Hill and Moanbane which became known as the 'Billy Byrnes Gap'. The informer was "cut to pieces most brutally" outside St Mary's Church in the town, and the phrase "died the death of the Big Sweep" was used in local vernacular for years afterwards when describing an animal who had died painfully or brutally.

Throughout the winter of 1797, tension in the town and country at large increased. Blessington, owing to its proximity to the mountain bases of the rebels, as well as the weakness of local garrisons, was "easy prey" for the rebels, according to 1798 historian Ruán O'Donnell. The era pre-dated the flooding of the valley to create the Poulaphouca Reservoir, and multiple land routes existed to the town from the nearby heights of Sorrel Hill and Moanbane.

In early May 1798, John Patrickson reported that Blessington House had been raided a few nights previously and that "seven guns, two cases of pistols and three swords" had been taken. The 1798 Rebellion proper broke out on 23 May that year with initial skirmishes in Counties Kildare, Meath and Wexford. Rebels escaping from engagements in Kilcullen and Ballymore Eustace, under the direction of rebel leader General Joseph Holt, dispersed to the Wicklow Mountains overlooking Blessington, where they formed a camp at Whelp Rock, close to Blackamore Hill, now known as Black Hill.

According to academic Michael Fewer, at 'Whelp's Rock', Holt established a makeshift camp where he "shaped dejected rebels into an effective fighting force with the intention of continuing the rebellion by waging guerrilla war on the loyalists until the expected French invasion." At the time, the only north-south roads "of any worth" close to the uplands of the Wicklow Mountains were the Enniskerry-Togher-Laragh-Rathdrum road to the east of the hills, and the Dublin-Blessington-Donard-Hacketstown road to the west.

=== Destruction ===
In the last days of May 1798, raiding parties from Blackmore Hill camp burned many homes belonging to the loyalist Lower Talbotstown Cavalry, which was absent on duty at the Curragh of Kildare, and Blessington itself came under attack. Many landlords suffered, but the greatest loss was to the absentee Marquis of Downshire whose opulent Blessington mansion was levelled. Yeoman officer William Patrickson was appalled by the devastation, and wrote in June 1798:

"Few of the tenants, if any, remain to occupy the ground-all gone to the wars... Blessington is completely destroyed-not a vestige remains, except the [Protestant] church and one or two old houses occupied by papists."

==== Aftermath ====
This William Patrickson may be the same source quoted as that of a John Patrickson who reported to the Marquis; "Blessington House and all its appendage and everything appertaining... are completely destroyed". Days later, the rebels returned to complete the destruction of the town, burning or destroying "every good house in it" except the Post Office and a house belonging to Mrs Farley, a sister of Roger Miley, the parish priest of the nearby Catholic church at Crosschapel. The original Baltyboys House nearby was also burnt around the same time.

Catholics as well as Protestants in the region were equally horrified by what had happened. In June 1798, Reverend Miley wrote to Dr John Troy, the Catholic Archbishop of Dublin, describing what he had experienced:

"For some days past we are totally convulsed both here and in the neighbouring parishes: every moral and religious sentiment has quit the country... nothing but anarchy, confusion, plunder and burning... the Marquis of Downshire's fine edifice at Blessinton (sic) with its offices are razed, all the fine furniture of every kind carried away... the cottages and the poor and the... middling classes have shared the same fate."

The British Major-General John Moore, later to become a Peninsular War-hero, was headquartered in Blessington on several occasions throughout 1798, and wrote from the town in July of that year that above 1,200 "country people" had already come into the town to surrender their arms, whereby they received 'protections'.

=== Blessington during the remainder of the Rebellion ===
On 4 September 1798, within hours of the evacuation of crown forces from Blessington who had been sent to County Mayo to contain the French landings there, Joseph Holt's men, who were holding out in the hills above the town, came into Blessington to rustle animals for food, the object of attention being a herd of cattle in Downshire's demesne.

According to Vincent Byrne, by this stage, Blessington was heavily fortified by the yeomanry who had by now installed a gun placement on the spire of the church. A section of Joseph Holt's men surrounded the church and occupied the yeomanry while the remainder herded cattle, sheep and horses from the demesne. The men returned the following day, 5 September 1798, and a skirmish with the Princess of Wales's Light Dragoons was recorded at Ballynahound Hill.

Later that same month, a force of 2,000 soldiers from Dublin marched on Blessington, meeting up with a contingent of cavalry already posted in the town, assembling in Tooper's Field / Troopersfield where General Lake had his headquarters. Together they raided Blackamore Hill but found the rebels had already left.

By autumn 1798 the rebellion was over, with the rebels defeated, but still Blessington remained in a state of lawlessness. As John Patrickson wrote: "No day, no night passes without numerous robberies, murders and burnings... if something is not shortly done there will not be a Protestant left in our part of the country. The Papists are entirely in possession, for all those who have not been killed are banished". By the end of the rebellion, many Protestants tenants had left the Blessington estate out of fear.

It is considered that the rebels left Russborough House, the other large house in the area, untouched, as John Leeson had been sympathetic to the United Irishmen's cause. Even so, Russborough was used as a barracks during 1798-99 by the Duke of York's Highlanders, who "vandalised parts of the interior to signal their displeasure at the liberal Earl of Milltown's absence in Europe during the Rebellion crisis." The house was also used as a location where rebels were court-martialled.

According to O'Donnell, the Blessington yeomanry were still "under arms" by mid-September 1801 when Lord Lieutenant Hardwicke undertook a three day grouse shooting tour of the surrounding countryside.

=== Compensation and decision not to rebuild ===
A government commission was established almost immediately to consider the claims of the 'suffering loyalists'. In the Blessington area, many people submitted claims, but Downshire's - in excess of £10,000 for the destruction of his house and property - was by far the largest. The marquis eventually received £9,267.

Only occasionally had Arthur, 2nd Marquess of Downshire, visited his Blessington estate, and after the burning of Blessington House visited even less often, staying at the administration building (Estate Office) of his agent whenever he did, next to St Mary's Church (in later years the 'Downshire Hotel'). Arthur died in Hillsborough on 7 September 1801, from suicide, leaving large debts, and his estates in poor condition.

He was succeeded by his son, Arthur Hill, 3rd Marquess of Downshire who took a more active interest in the running and reforming of the Blessington estate from afar in County Down, however, he, nor any further holder of the title decided that Blessington House was worth rebuilding. The Downshire estate became unusual from that point on, compared to other landed estates, as there was no big house attached to it.

== Remains ==
=== Contemporary accounts ===
Cruise et al. contend that the ruins of the house were removed "about 1830", which would correspond with the editors of "The Wicklow World of Elizabeth Smith: 1840-1850", who claim that the ruins of the house "were removed about 30 years" after 1798. However, the house was still noted as being a ruin on the first edition Ordnance Survey map in the 1840s, and ruins are mentioned as late as 1846 in a Slater's Directory entry for Blessington (see below).

Pigot's Directory of 1824 contains the following entry about the house in their Blessington paragraph: "The ruins of his (Boyle's) residence, which was burned by the rebels in 1798, are still to be seen by the pitying passenger". Samuel Lewis's A Topographical Dictionary of Ireland described the estate thus in 1837, with no mention of ruins:

The Marquess of Downshire had a handsome mansion and demesne of 410 statute acres, with a deer park of 340 acres, all surrounded by a wall, and situated on the right of the road from Dublin: the mansion was originally built by Primate Boyle, the last ecclesiastical chancellor of Ireland, who held his court of chancery here, and built houses for the six clerks, two of which yet remain; the interior was burnt by the insurgents in 1798 and has not been restored; the demesne is richly embellished with fine timber.

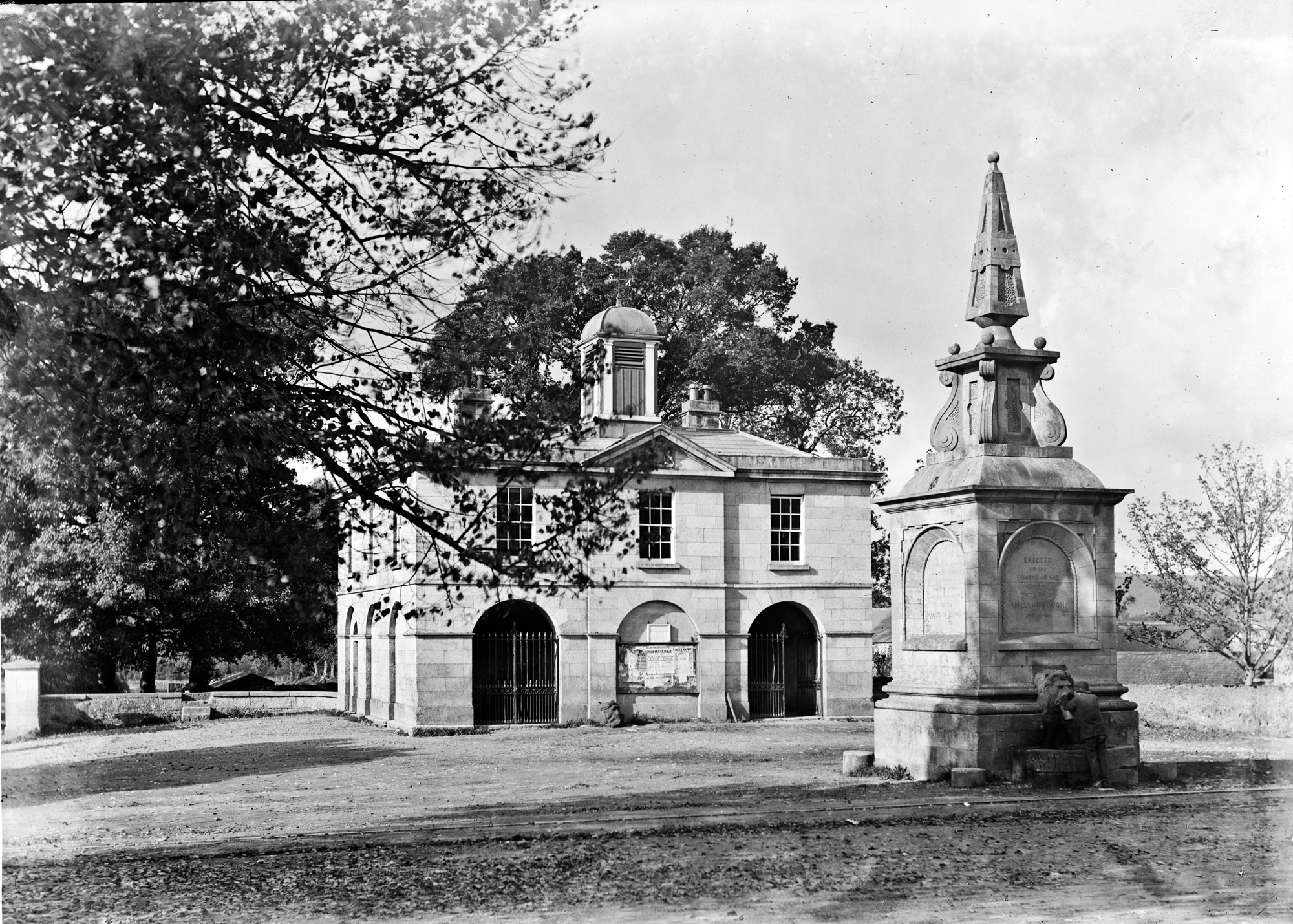
The Market House in Blessington town square, the foundations of which were constructed using materials from the ruins of Blessington House

Descriptive Remarks from an Ordnance Survey Parish Namebook of 1839 recorded the townland of Blessington Demesne as consisting of "The part all round Downshire House (which is now in ruins)".

Slater's Directory of 1846, in their description of Blessington, noted: "Blessington was formerly a parliamentary borough, and the residence of Archbishop Boyle, the ruins of which are still to be seen".

=== Modern ===
The matching tuscan column pairs marking the entrances to both Blessington Garda Station (c.1820) and the Downshire Hotel (c.1810) were salvaged from the ruins of the house. Much of the stone from the original building was also reused in the construction of buildings in Blessington, including the foundations of the Market House which was built to serve as a market and court house at the end of the 1830s.

In the 1930s, oral histories were collected from elderly Blessington residents by local schoolchildren as part of the Irish Folklore Commission's Schools' Collection project, with the following information gathered about the house:

In a field not very far from Blessington, there is an old wine-cellar which belonged to a fine castle that was there once. It belonged to the Marquis of Downshire, the castle was burned down in the '98 rebellion and only the cellar remained. It is supposed to have a secret passage leading to Kilbride, another place not very far away. If we go down to where the cellar is it is possible to see the carriage drive and avenue to the castle. It is all a level field now, and only just the traces can be seen. The entrance gate and gate-lodge are still standing and in good repair. There was a deer-park round the castle before it was burned down, this cannot be seen very clearly now.

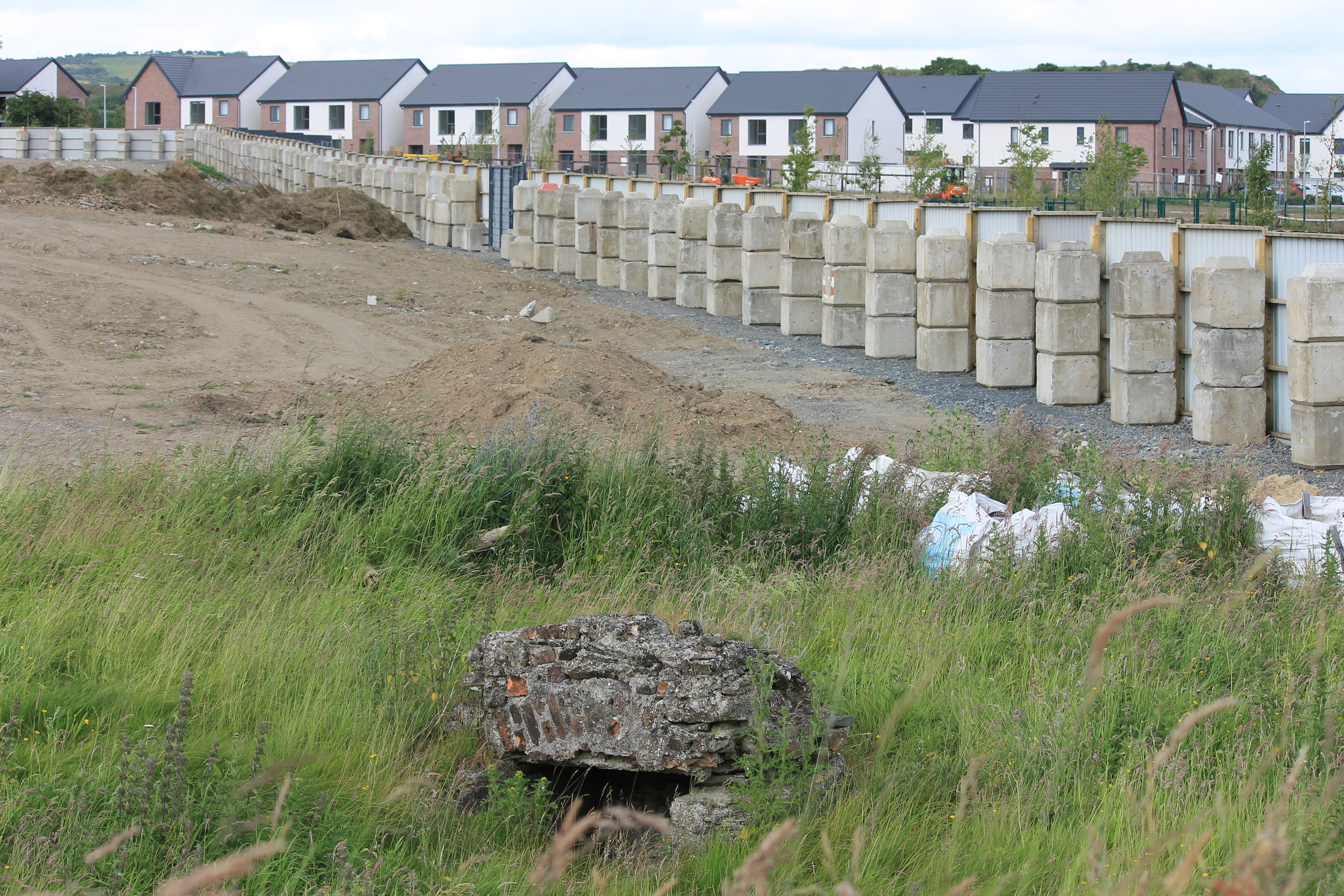
The entrance to the old wine cellar of Blessington House in 2025

A set of granite entrance pillars were relocated to the entrance of the Blessington branch of the Wicklow County Council offices on Oak Drive prior to 2002, while parts of the old deer park demesne walls were noted as still standing at Glending forest on the R410 road (Naas Road) that same year.

By 2003, only "a small portion of the wine cellar" remained in situ where the house once stood, and as of 2020, it was recorded that the gatepiers at the town square remained the only visible clue as to the buildings' past presence. The gatepiers had marked the beginning of the straight avenue of lime trees which existed from the town square to the entrance of the house. The "four stone tree" in the town centre is the last remaining lime tree surviving from this original avenue.

The legacy of the estate is remembered today in the townland names of "Blessington Demesne" (which takes up a large part of the town), and the adjacent "Deerpark" which covers Glen Ding wood. The housing estate named Deerpark is also a reminder.

== See also ==
- Anglo-Irish big house
- Destruction of Irish country houses (1919–1923)
- List of historic houses in the Republic of Ireland
- Number 10 Henrietta Street, Dublin, also known as Blessington House
- Transition Year students at the local secondary school St Marks, built a model of the Manor House of Blessington during the 2000/2001 school year.

== Gallery ==
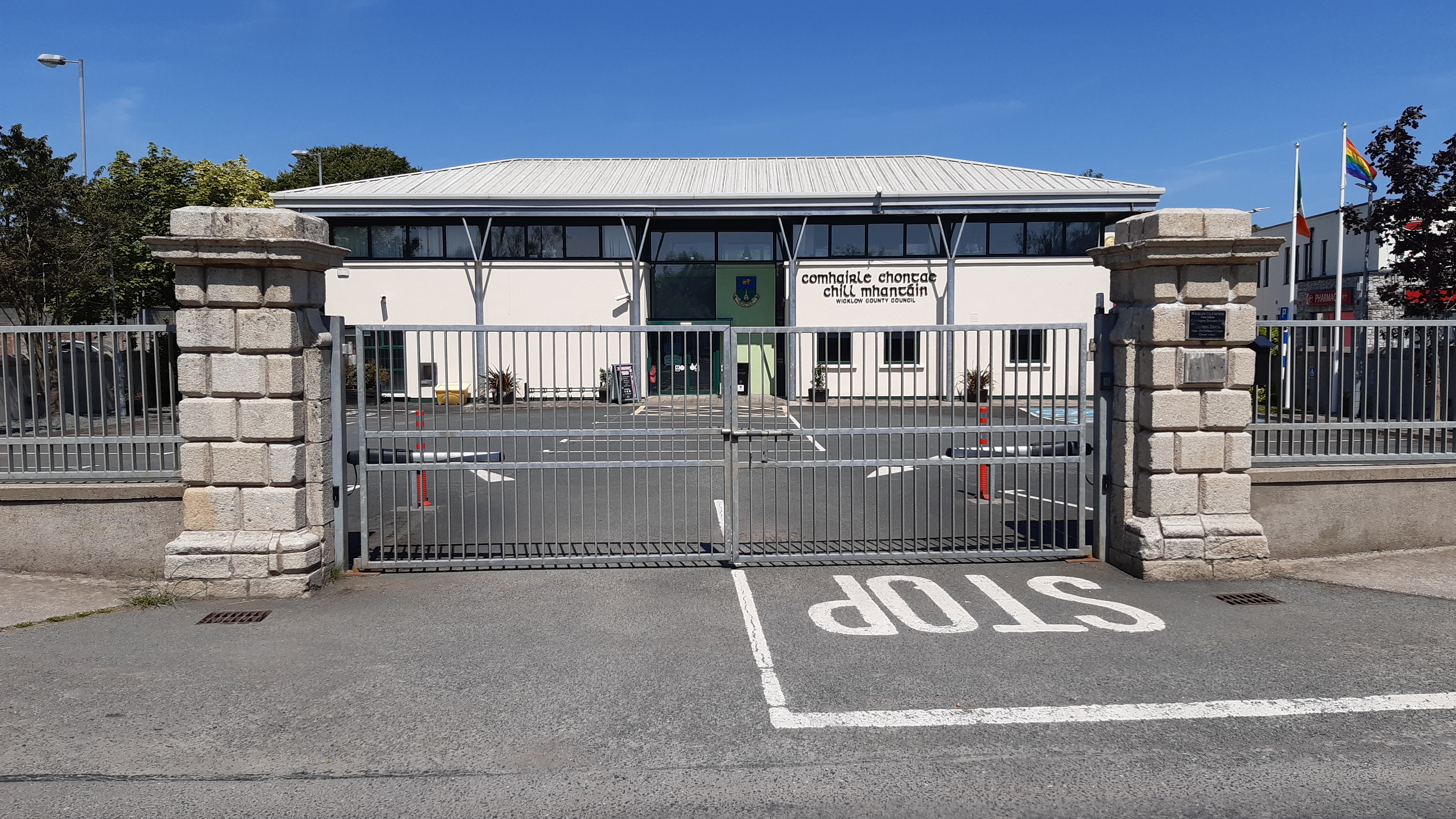
Set of granite entrance pillars salvaged from the house at the entrance to Wicklow County Council offices

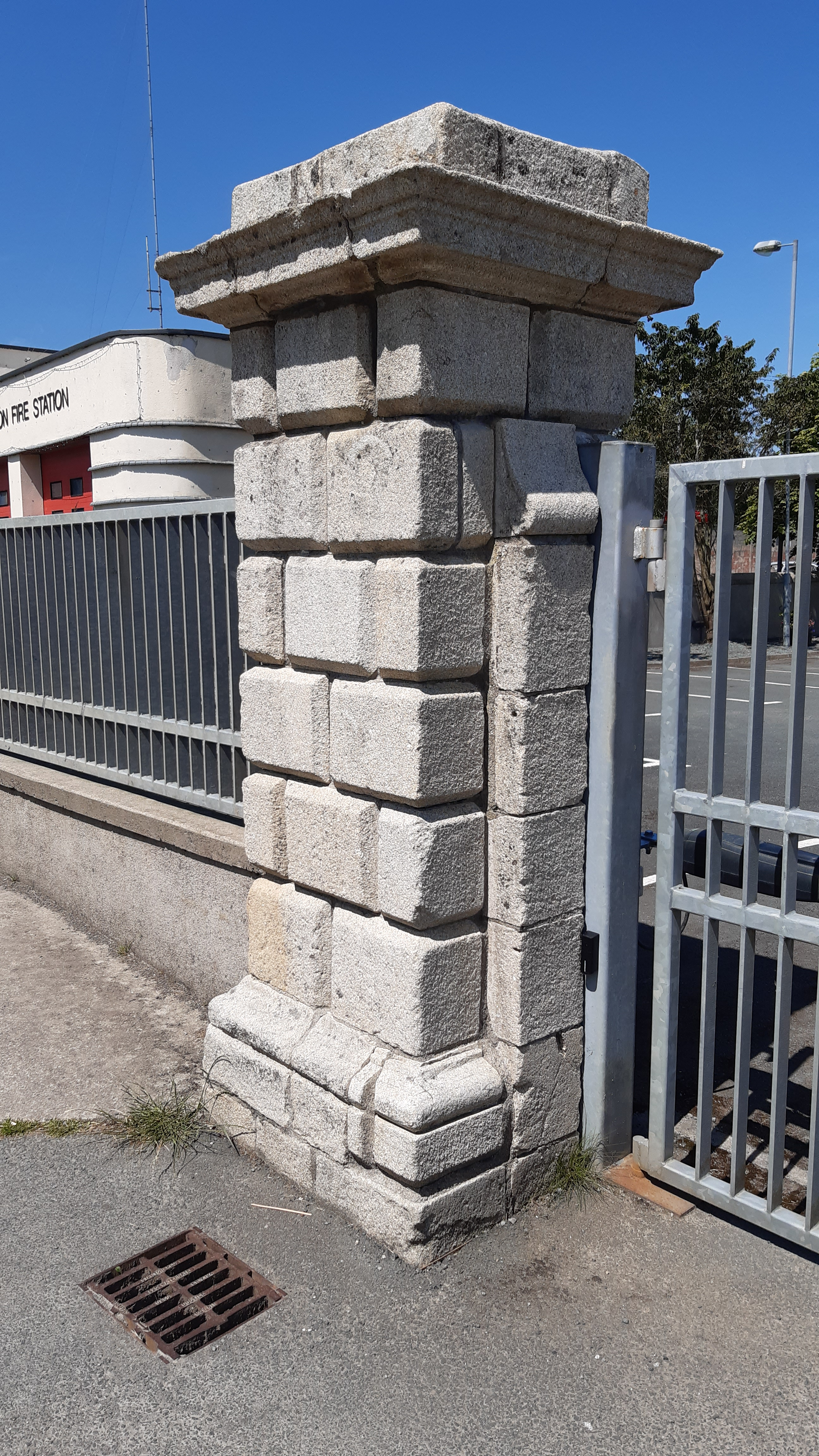
Sideview of entrance pillar

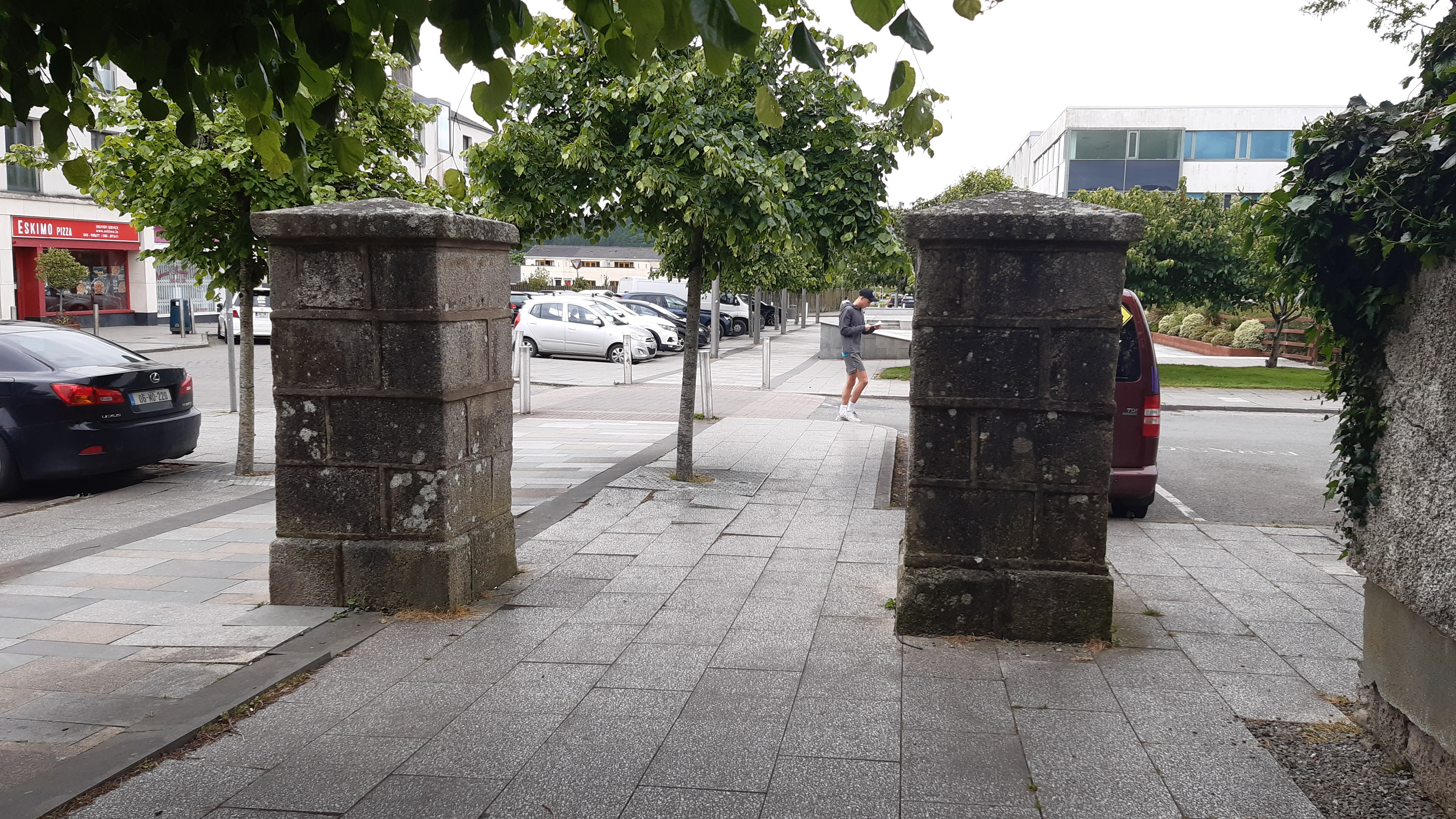
Gate piers that marked the beginning of the avenue from the town square to the entrance of Blessington House

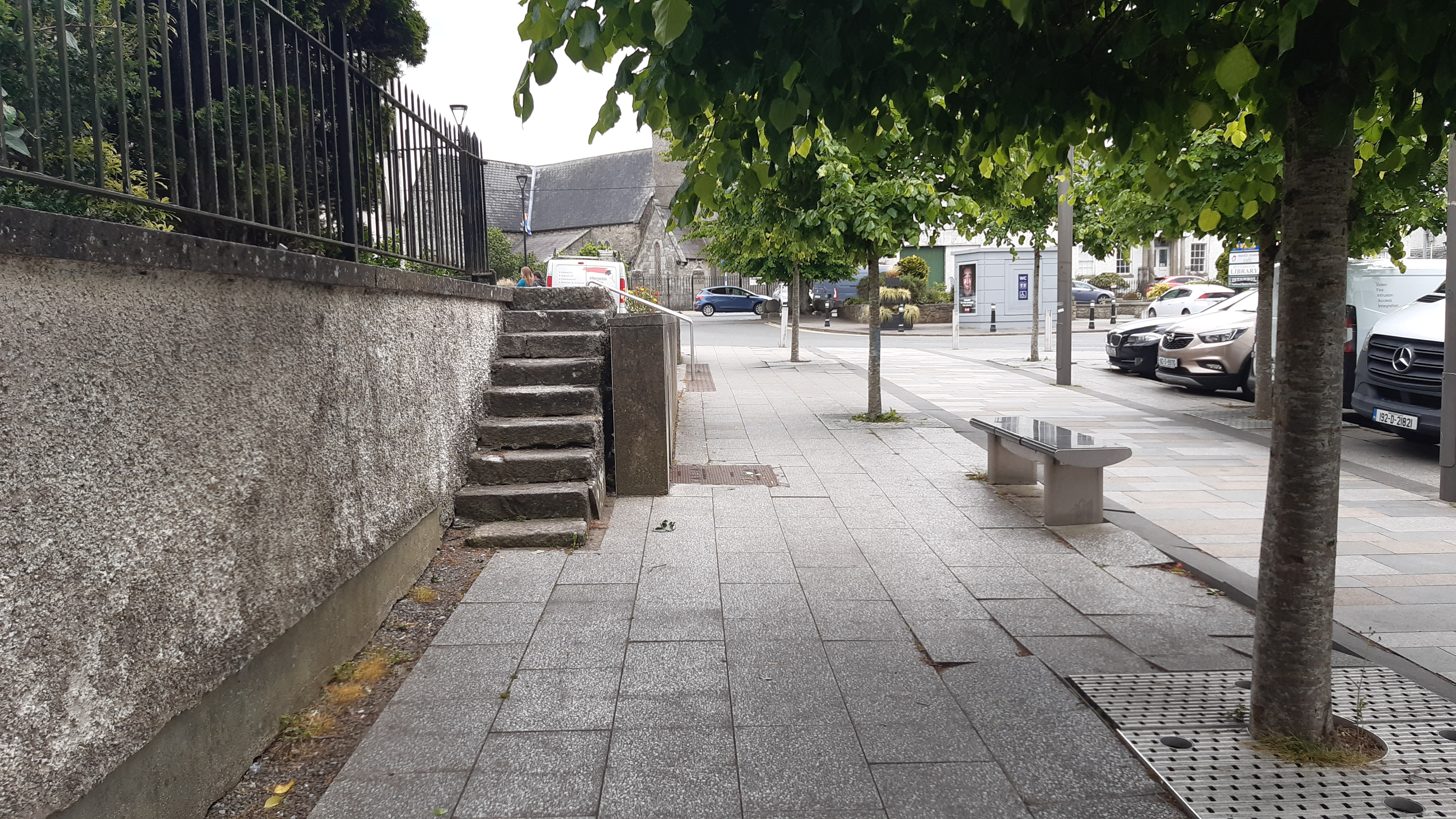
Old stone steps near the gate piers

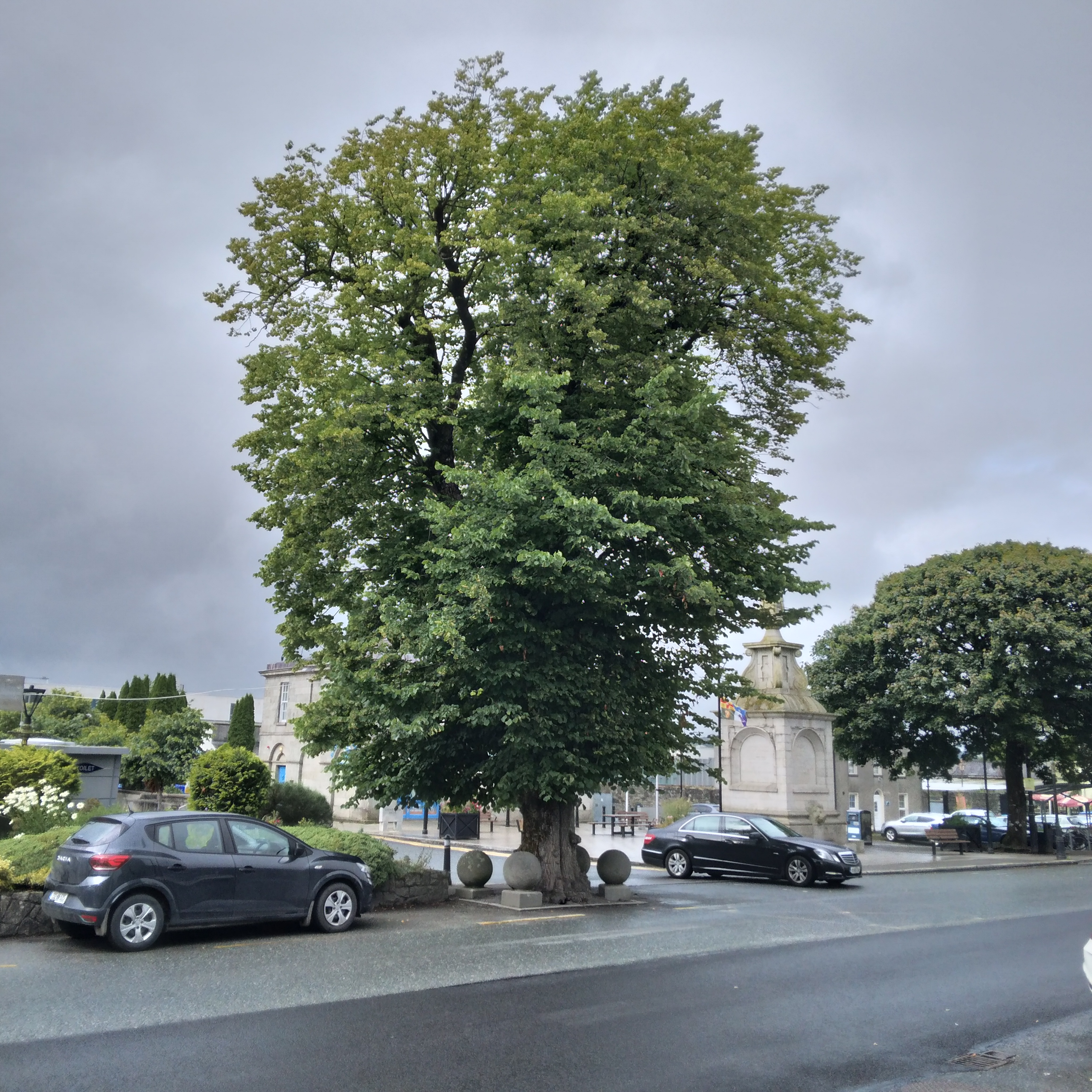
The Four Stone Tree

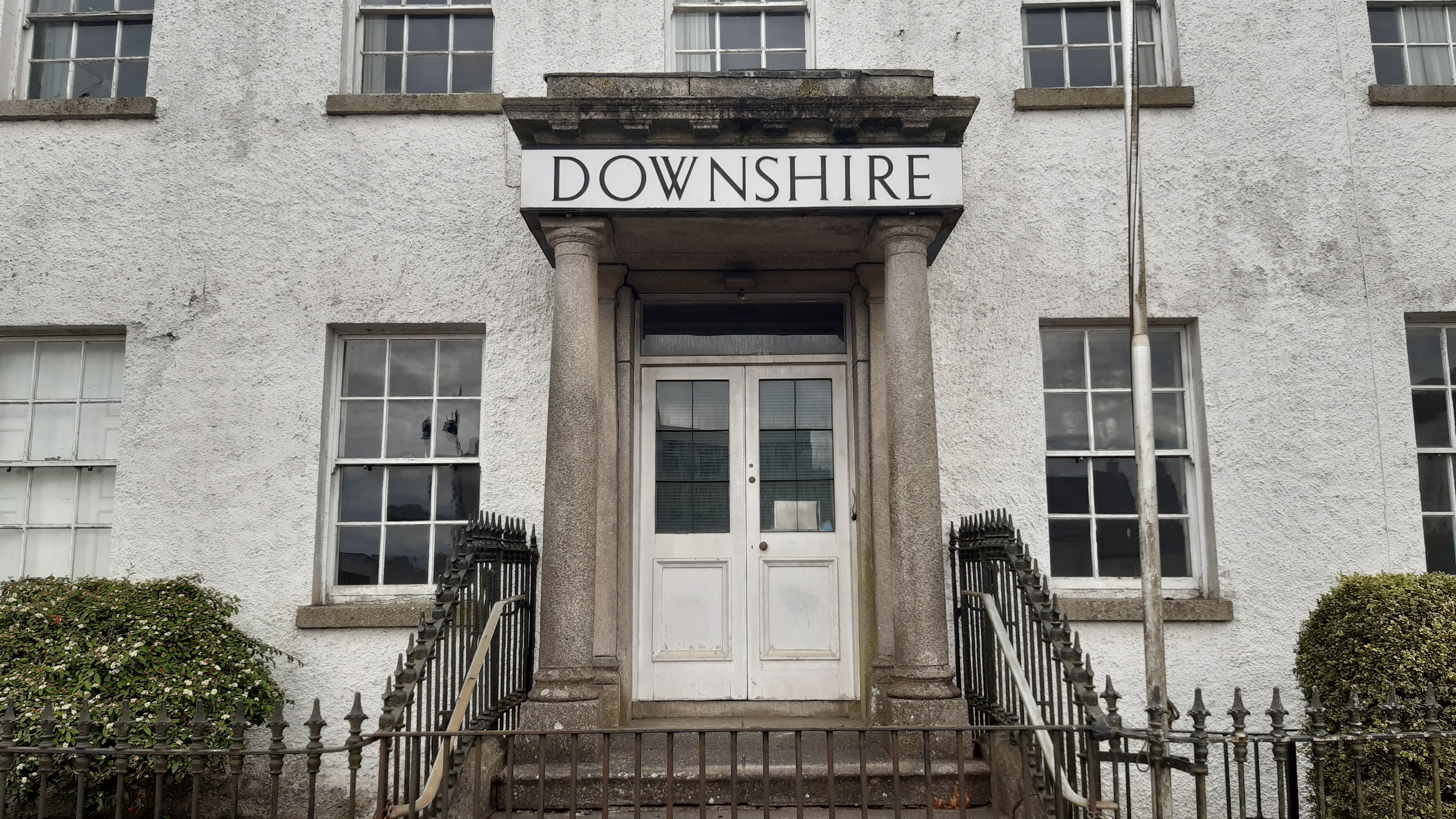
Tuscan columns salvaged from the house at the entrance to the Downshire Hotel

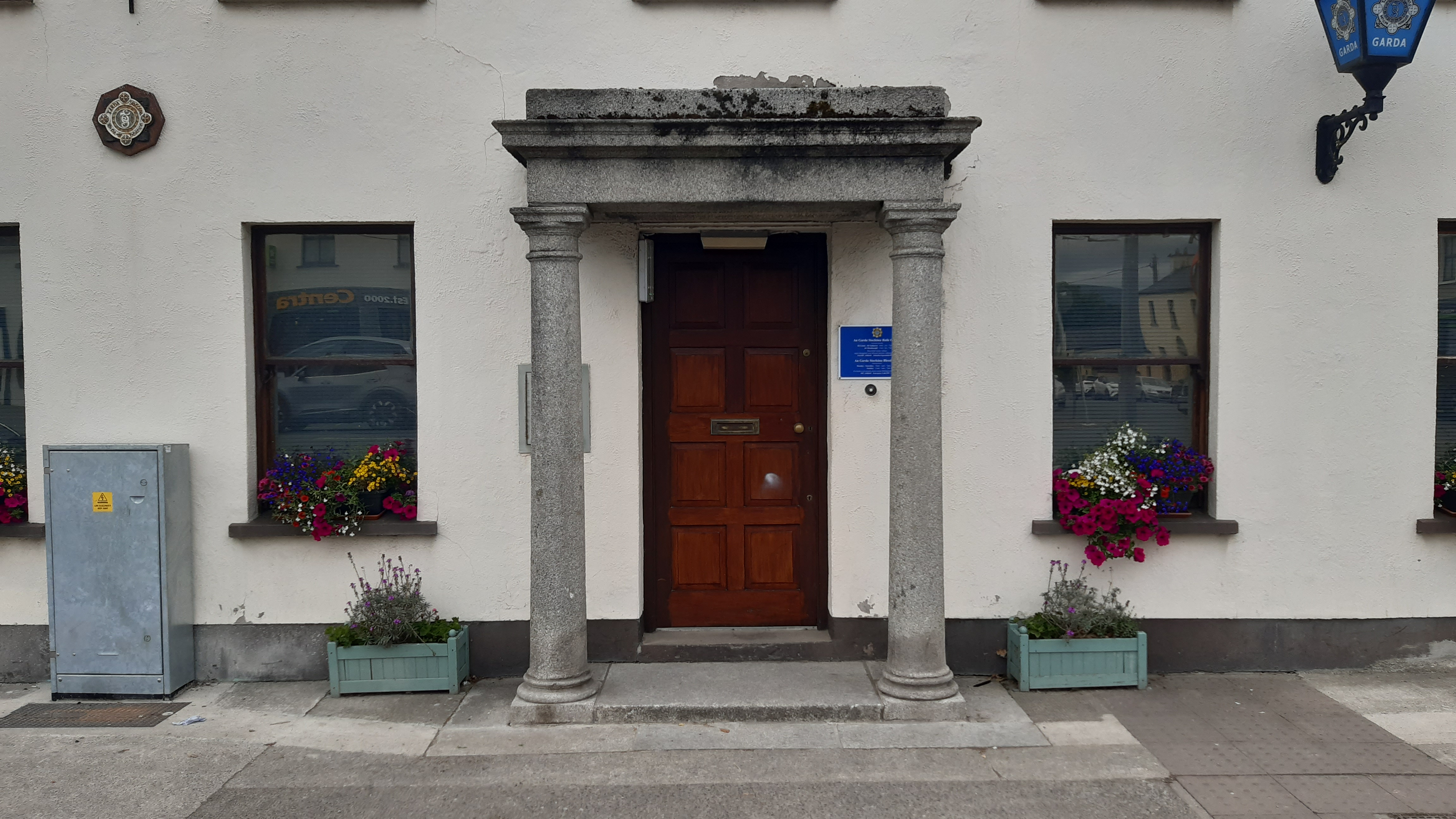
Columns at the entrance to Blessington Garda Station

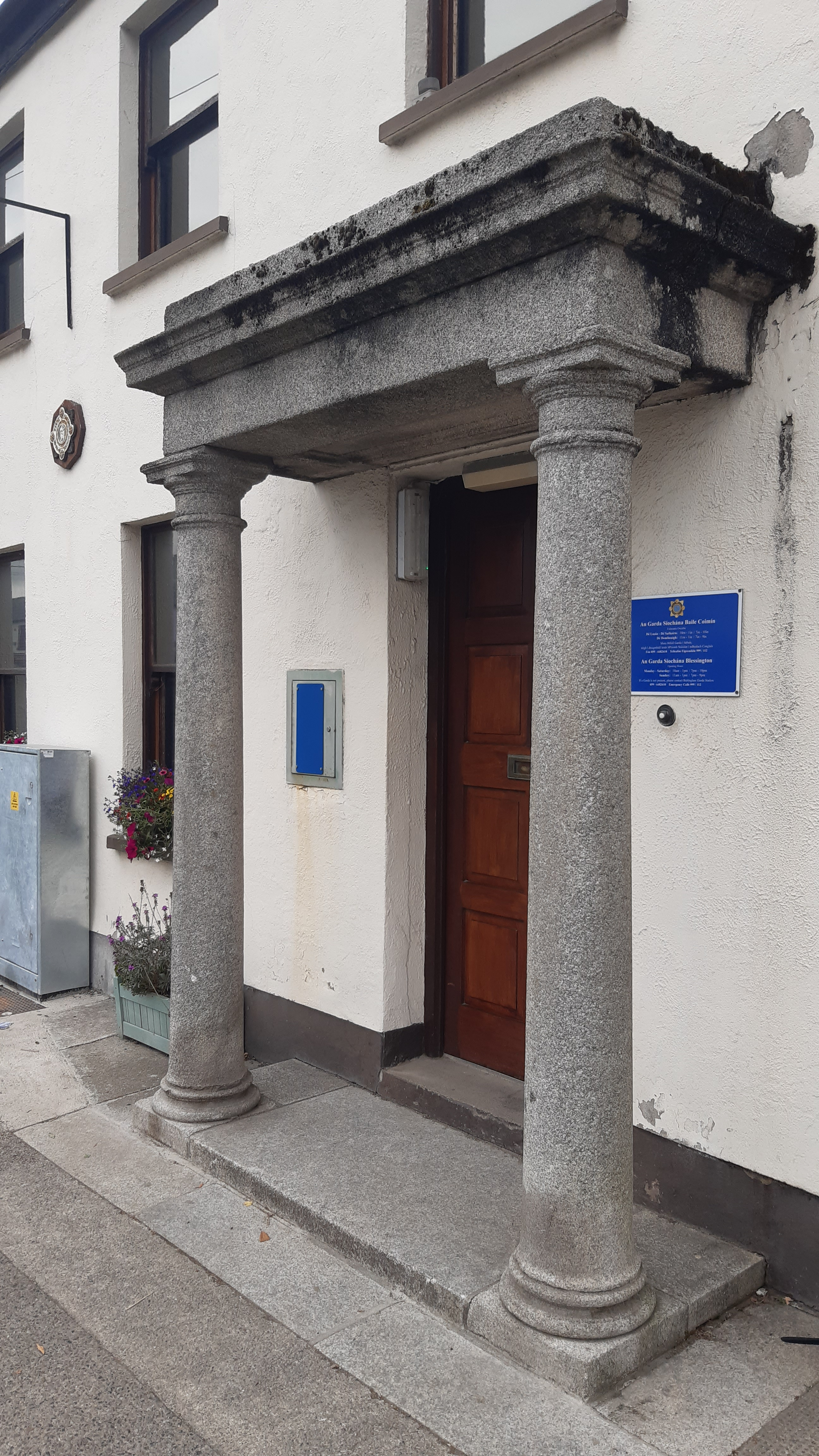
Side view of columns

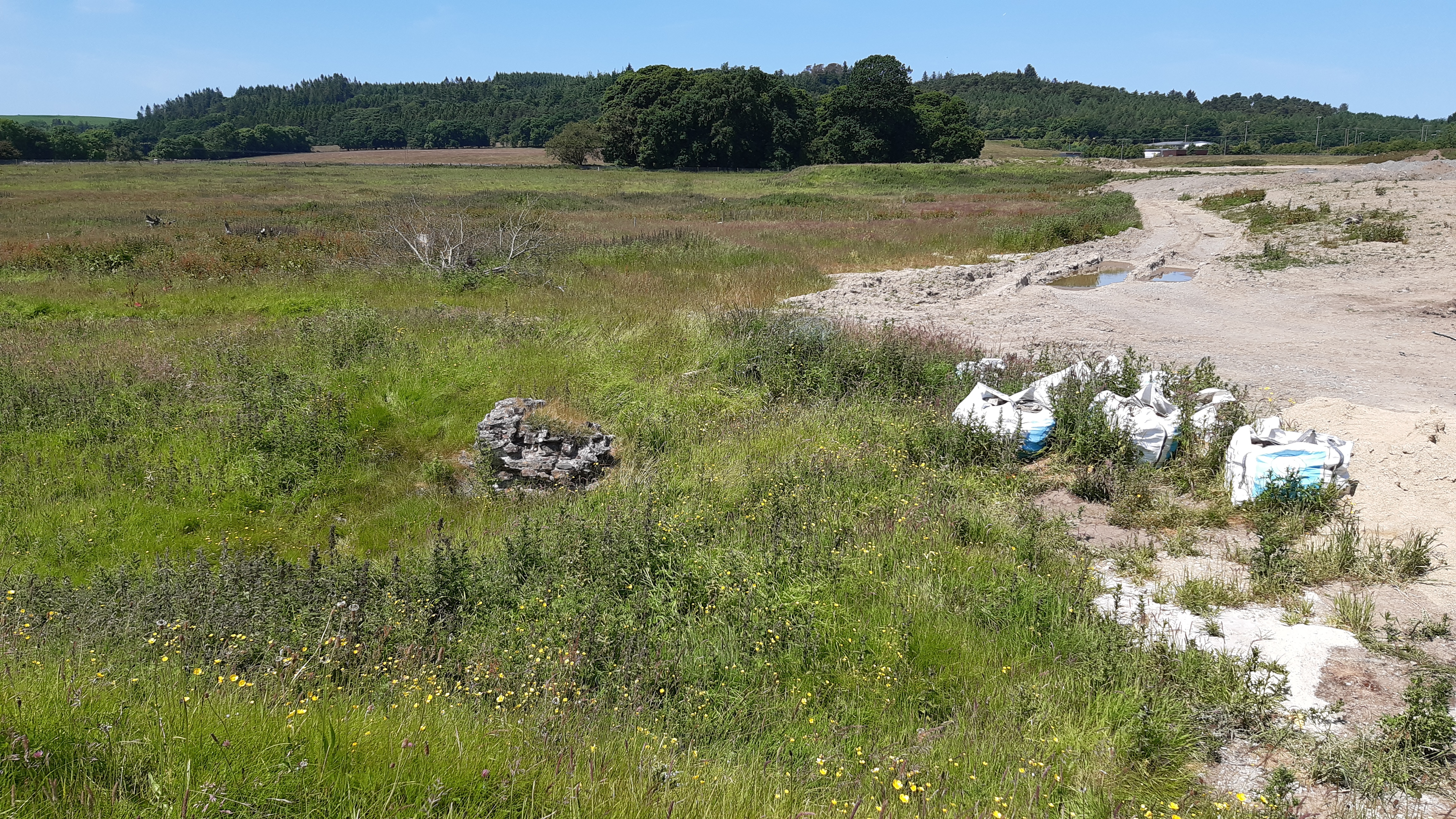
The remains of the wine cellar in situ in June 2024, looking northwards to Glen Ding forest

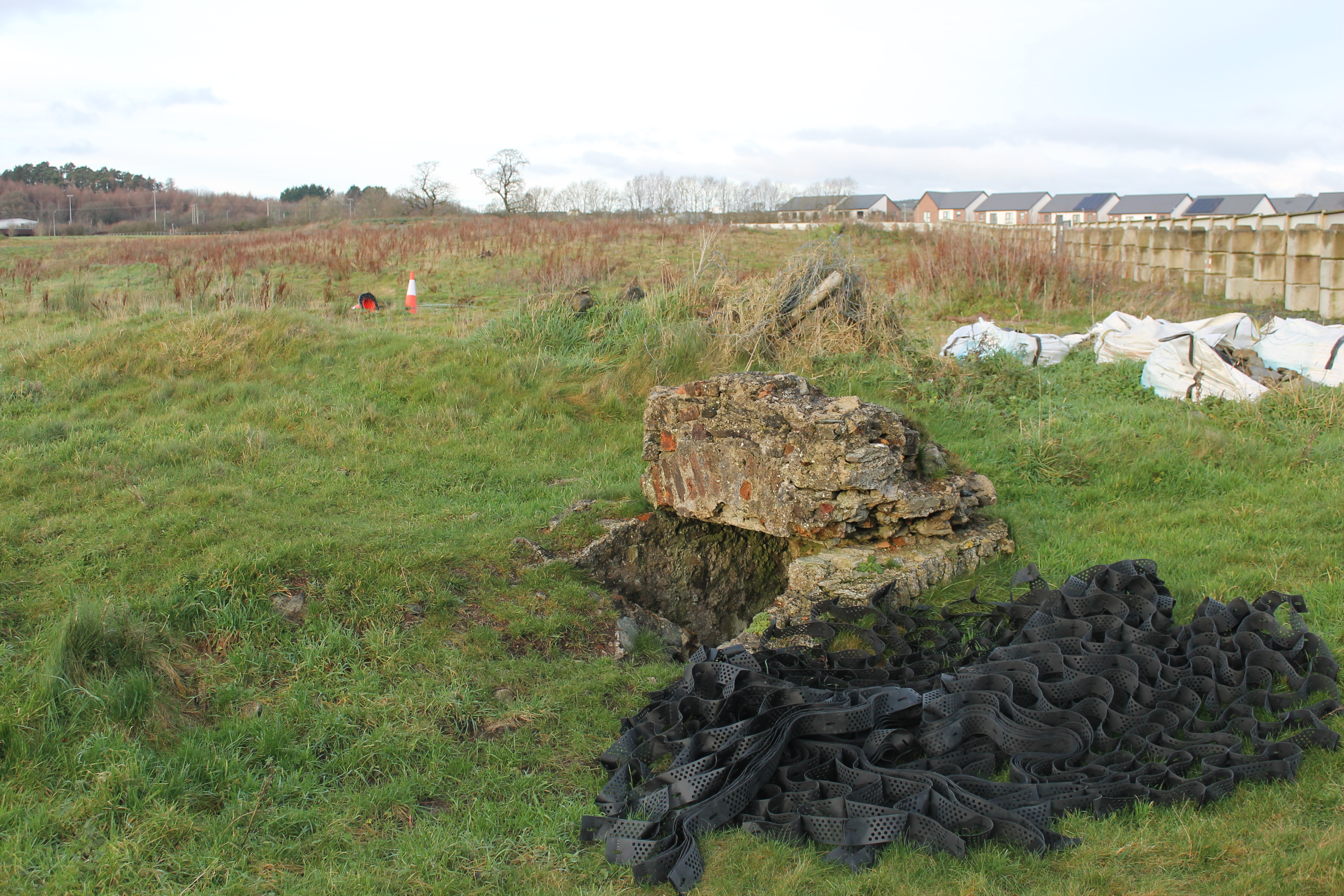
The wine cellar entrance in December 2025

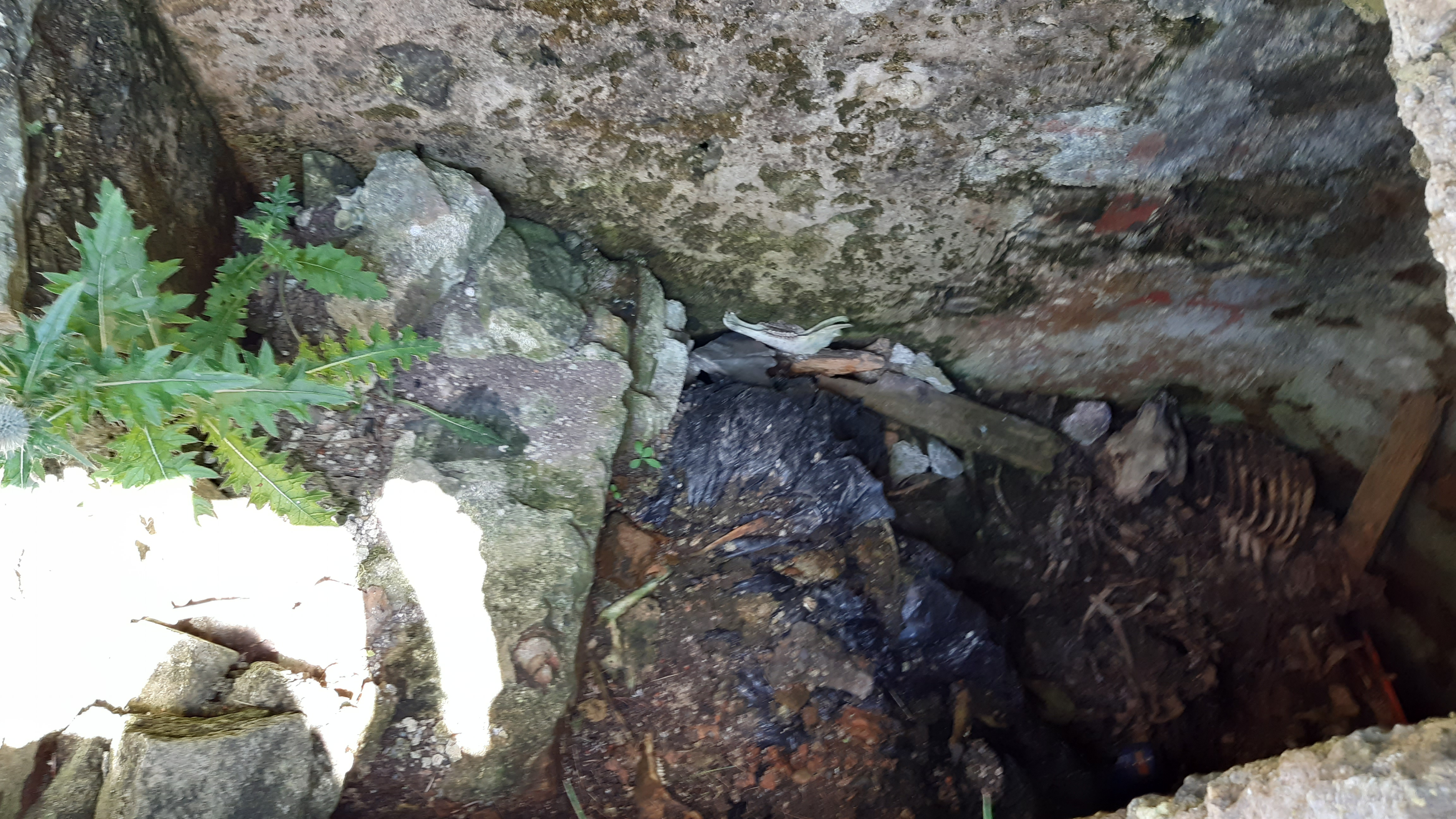
Entrance to the cellar, June 2024

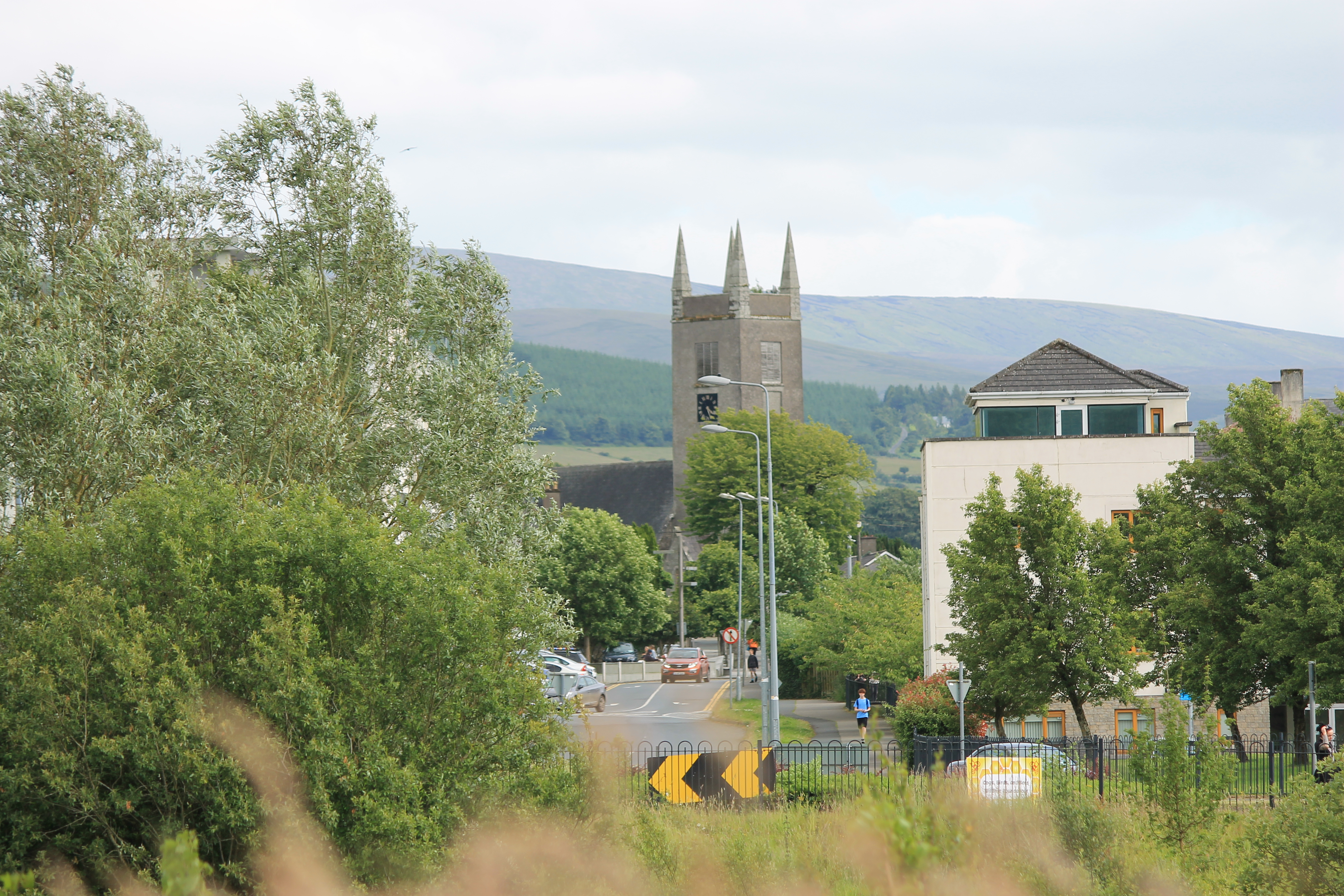
St Mary's Church as viewed from the original footprint of the house

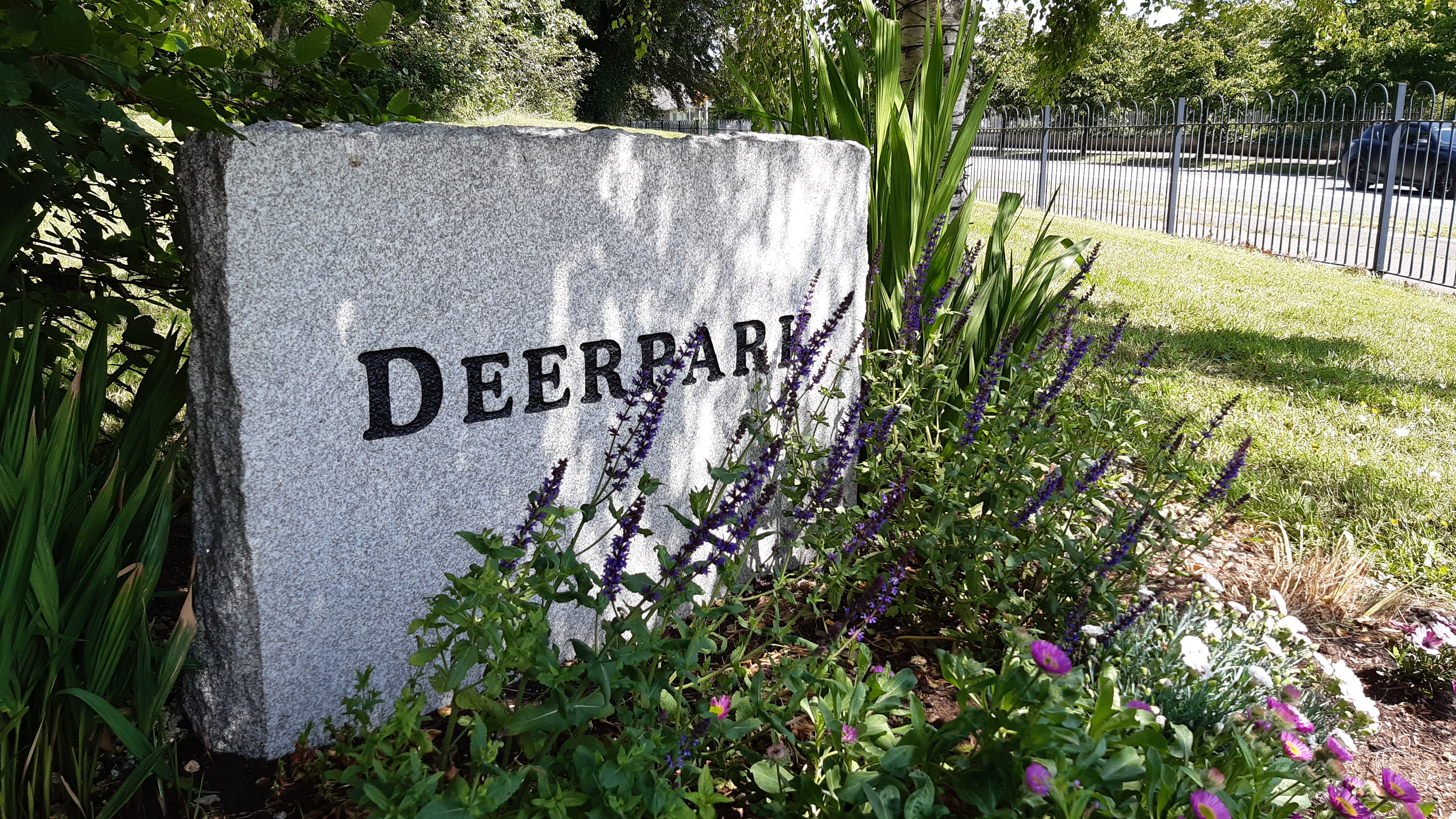
Local housing estate named after the original deerpark

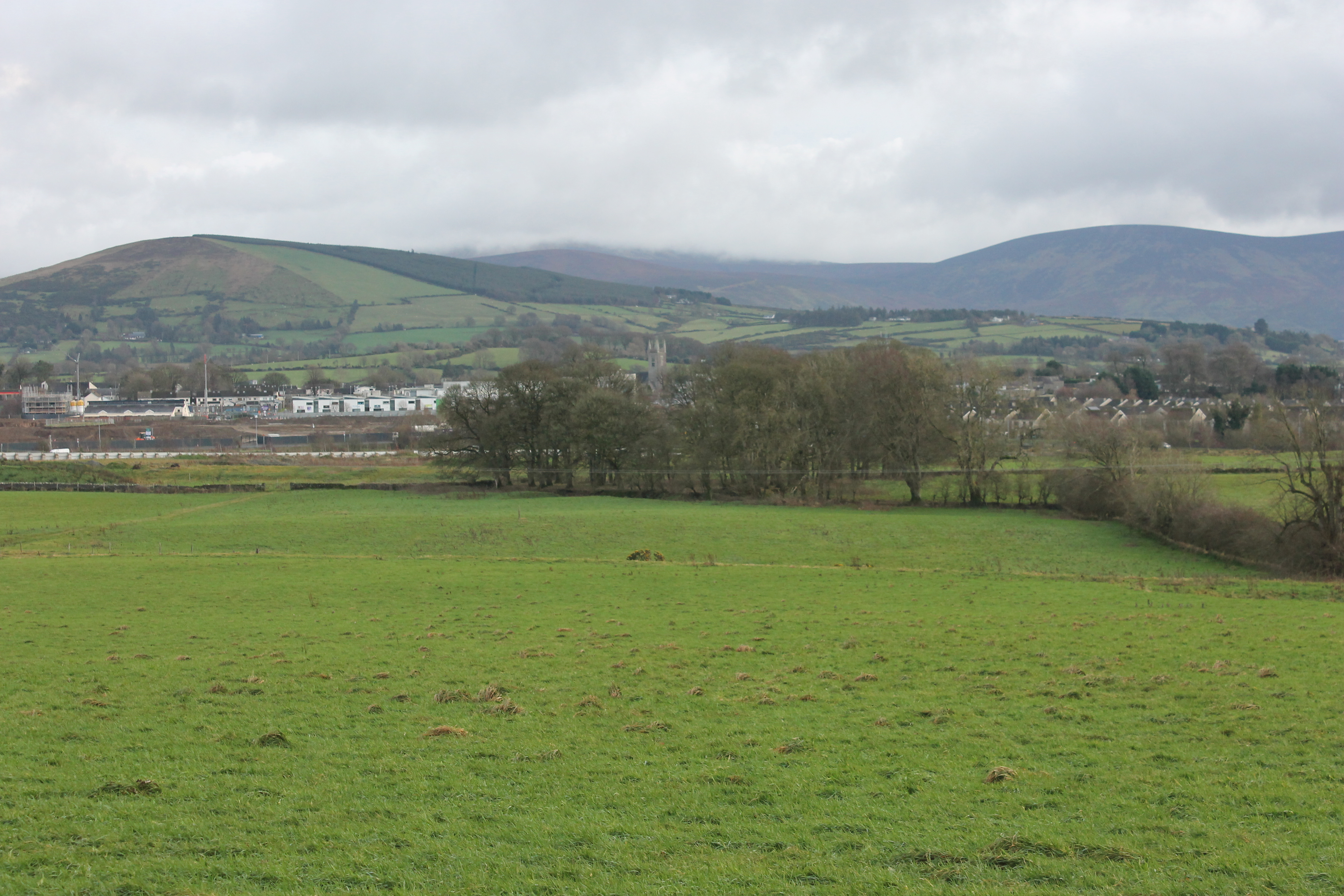
A view of St Mary's Church clocktower from the north of Blessington (winter view), roughly corresponding to Tudor's 1745 engraving
