= St Mary's Church, Blessington =

17th century church in Ireland

St. Mary's Church, Blessington
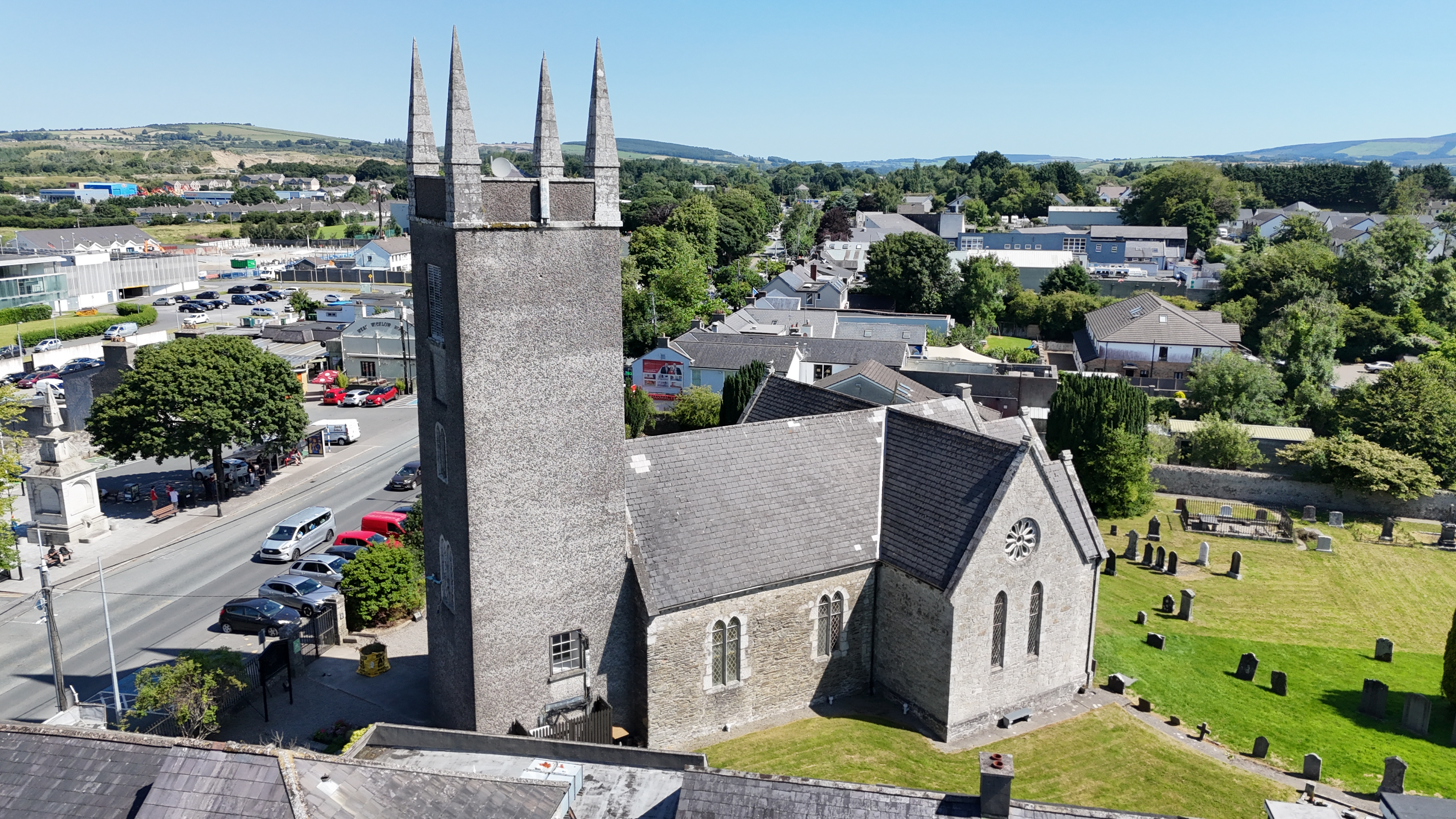
- The church and clock tower in 2025 (clock is on opposite side of tower)

- Location within Ireland
- 53.1707°N 6.5320°W
- Location: Main Street; Blessington; County Wicklow; W91 PT99
- Country: Ireland
- Denomination: Church of Ireland
- Website: www.ireland.anglican.org/find-a-church/parish/14940/blessington-st-mary

History
- Founded: 17 September 1683
- Dedication: Saint Mary

Architecture
- Architect: unknown

Administration
- Province: Province of Dublin
- Diocese: United Dioceses of Dublin and Glendalough
- Parish: Blessington Union of Parishes

St. Mary's Church is a Church of Ireland church located in Blessington, County Wicklow, Ireland. The church was built by Michael Boyle, Archbishop of Armagh in the 1670s and 1680s, and dedicated on 17 September 1683.

The clock tower houses the oldest surviving set of bells in Ireland, the original bells used since its foundation, cast in 1682 by Bartlett bellfounders of London. The tower is also notable for possessing what has been described as the oldest public clock in Ireland, and/or the oldest working turret clock in Ireland.

== History ==
In 1667, Michael Boyle, then serving as the Archbishop of Dublin, bought the old Norman Lordship of the Three Castles in west Wicklow (as well as an estate in Monkstown, Dublin) for £1,000. Boyle chose to live in his newly acquired Wicklow estate and was granted a royal charter to establish a new town there on a greenfield site, which he named Blessington - or Blesinton as it was more commonly referred to during the 1600-1800s. He started building Blessington House in 1673, to designs by Dublin architect and carpenter Thomas Lucas. One of the main avenues leading from the house linked it directly to the front of St Mary's Church, which was completed some years later.

Like nearby St. John's Church in Ballymore Eustace (built 1820), local granite was used in the construction of the church. The church was consecrated by the Bishop of Kildare on 24 August 1683, and subsequently dedicated on 17 September that same year. The dedication was attended by many of the clergy of the diocese, who came "in their formalities to the church... most of them in their surplices and hoods to join the rector, John Sydall". According to Kathy Trant, the procession outside the building was curtailed due to a 'deluge' of rain, which forced the dignitaries to take shelter inside the church where the formal service of convocation and communion took place.

With the burning of Blessington House during the 1798 Rebellion, St Mary's Church became the only extant building in the town associated with Archbishop Boyle, the town's founder.

The building was extended in later years, once in 1856 with the construction of the north transept, and again in 1889 with the addition of the organ transept. The original church organ, donated by Lord Milltown, was later sold to Baltinglass Church. The current organ, dating from 1890, was donated by the 6th Earl of Milltown, Edward Nugent Leeson, of nearby Russborough House, to commemorate his brother Joseph Henry, the 5th Earl. The stained glass window in the church was a gift from an anonymous donor in 1876. Numerous memorial plaques are visible on the walls inside the church.

On Sunday 24 September 2023, parishioners marked 340 years of worship at the church, with a Songs of Praise service. Joan Griffith, honorary secretary of Blessington Union of Parishes described it as a "much loved church."

== Architecture ==
According to the National Inventory of Architectural Heritage, the church is "constructed in rubble granite" whereas the "three-stage bell and clock tower is finished in roughcast render". The clock tower has a castellated parapet with tall pinnacles rising from all four corners. Window openings in the church are mostly pointed-arched and frequently arranged in pairs; the glazing for which is leaded.

== Gallery ==
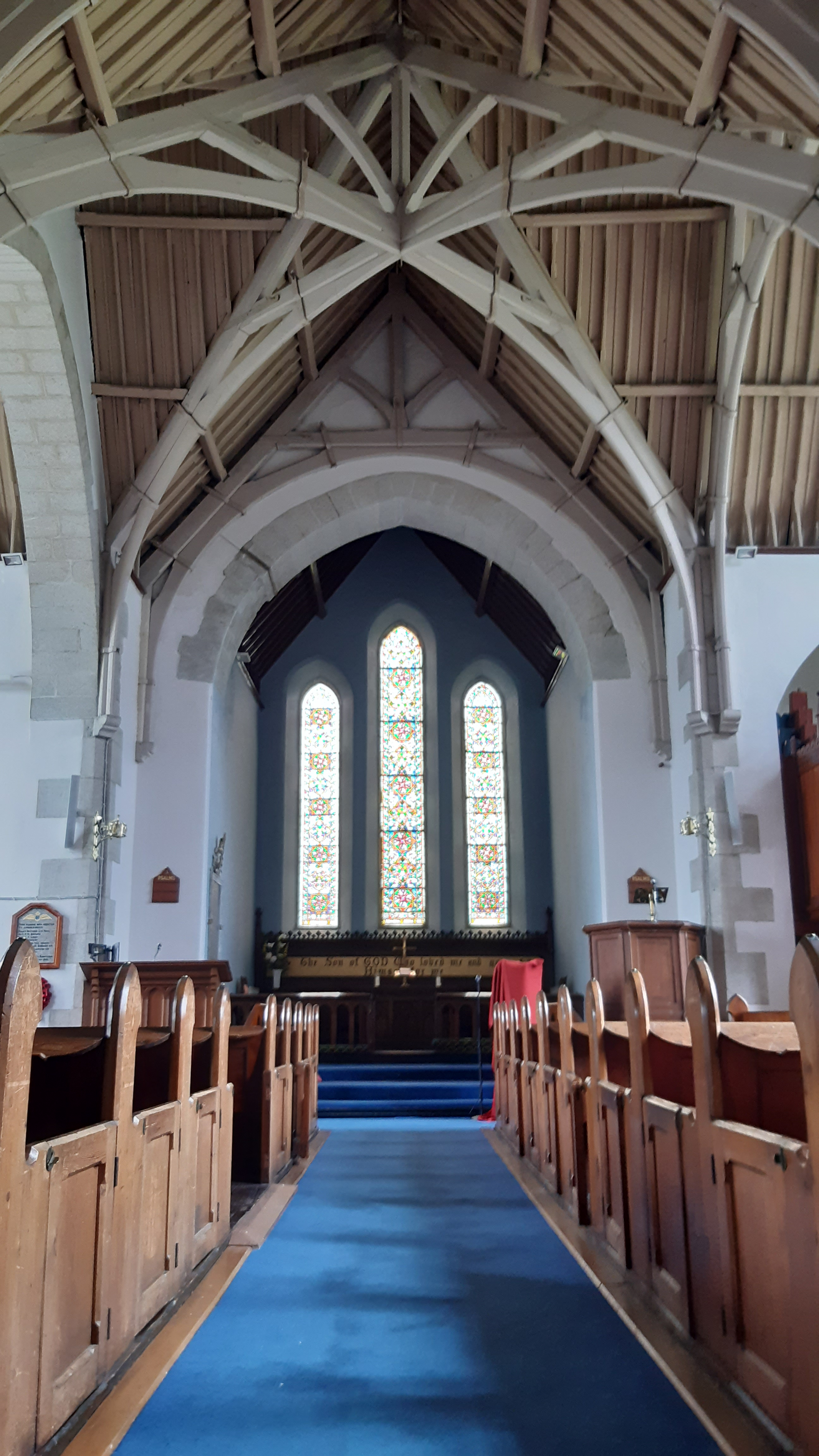
Looking east towards the altar and stained glass windows

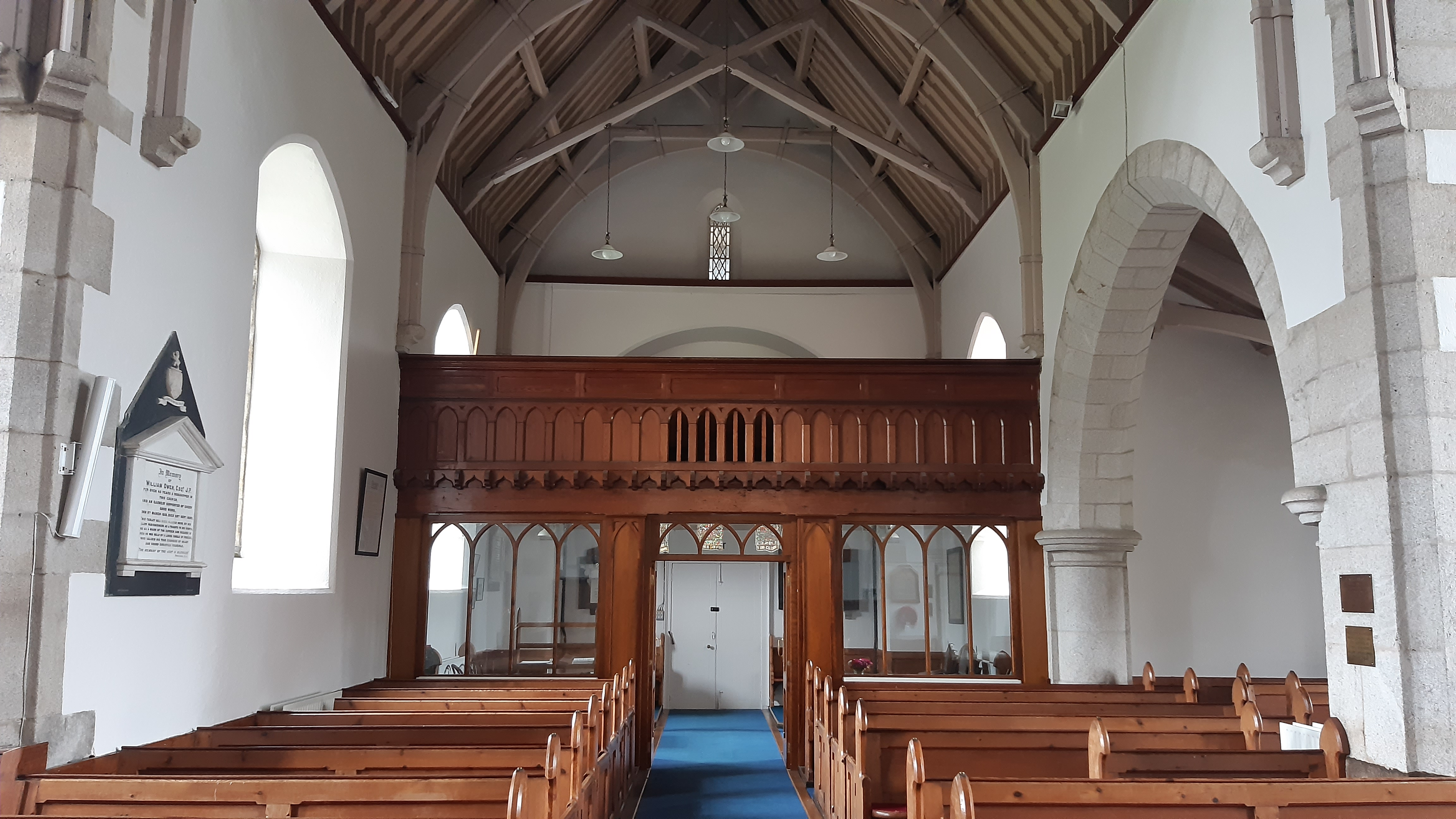
Looking west towards the entrance

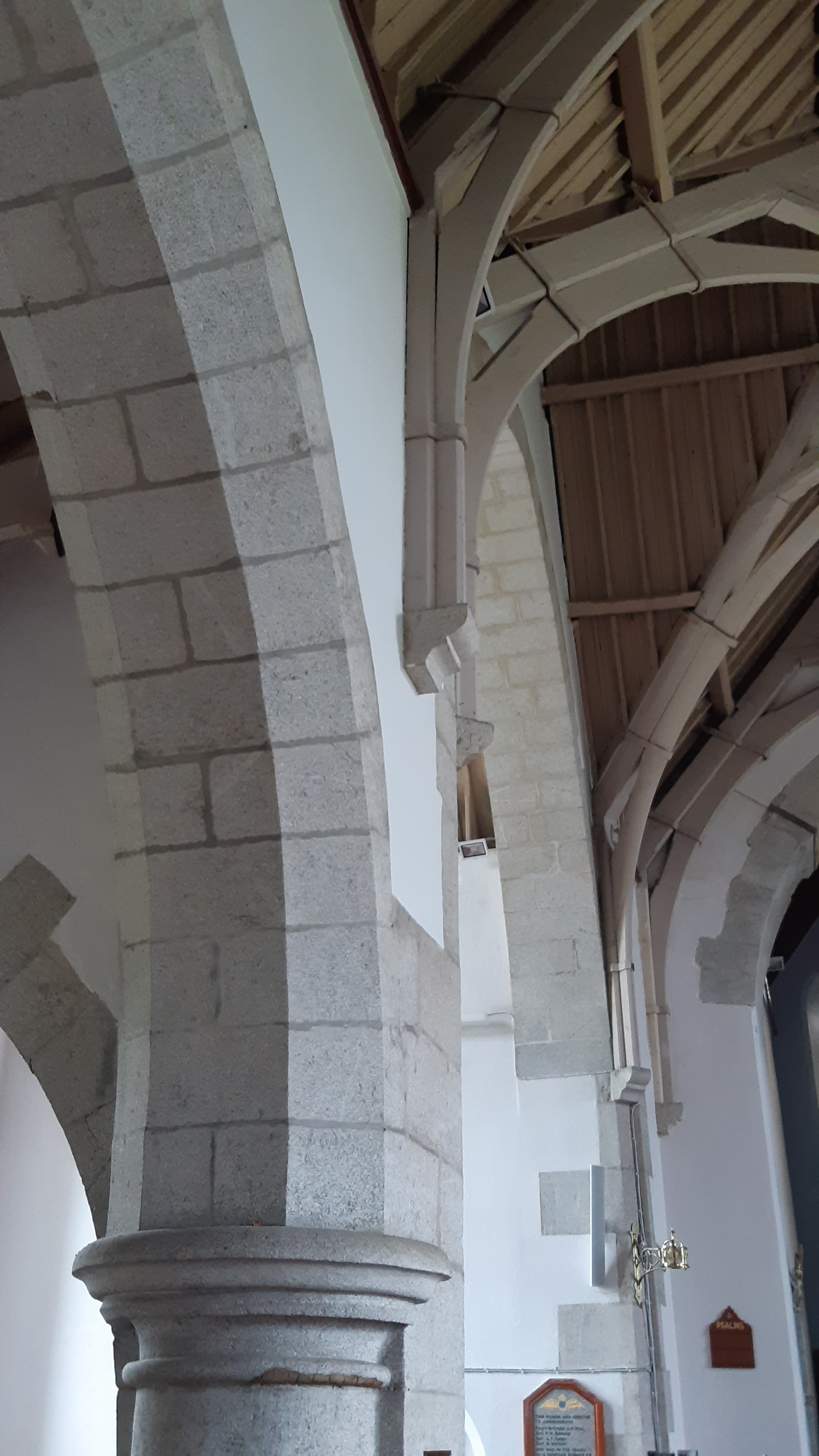
Stone arch and wooden roof supports

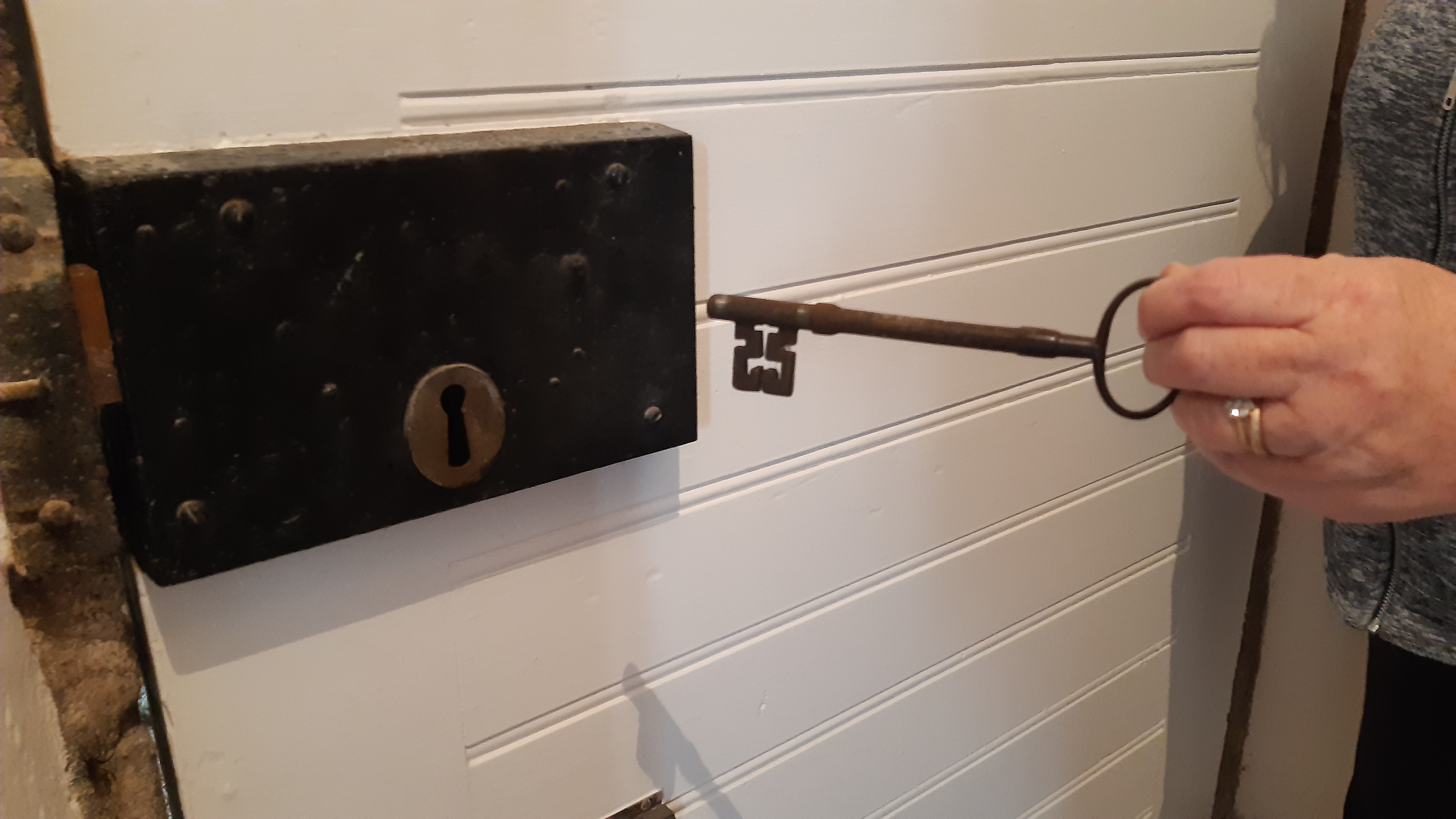
Old lock and key

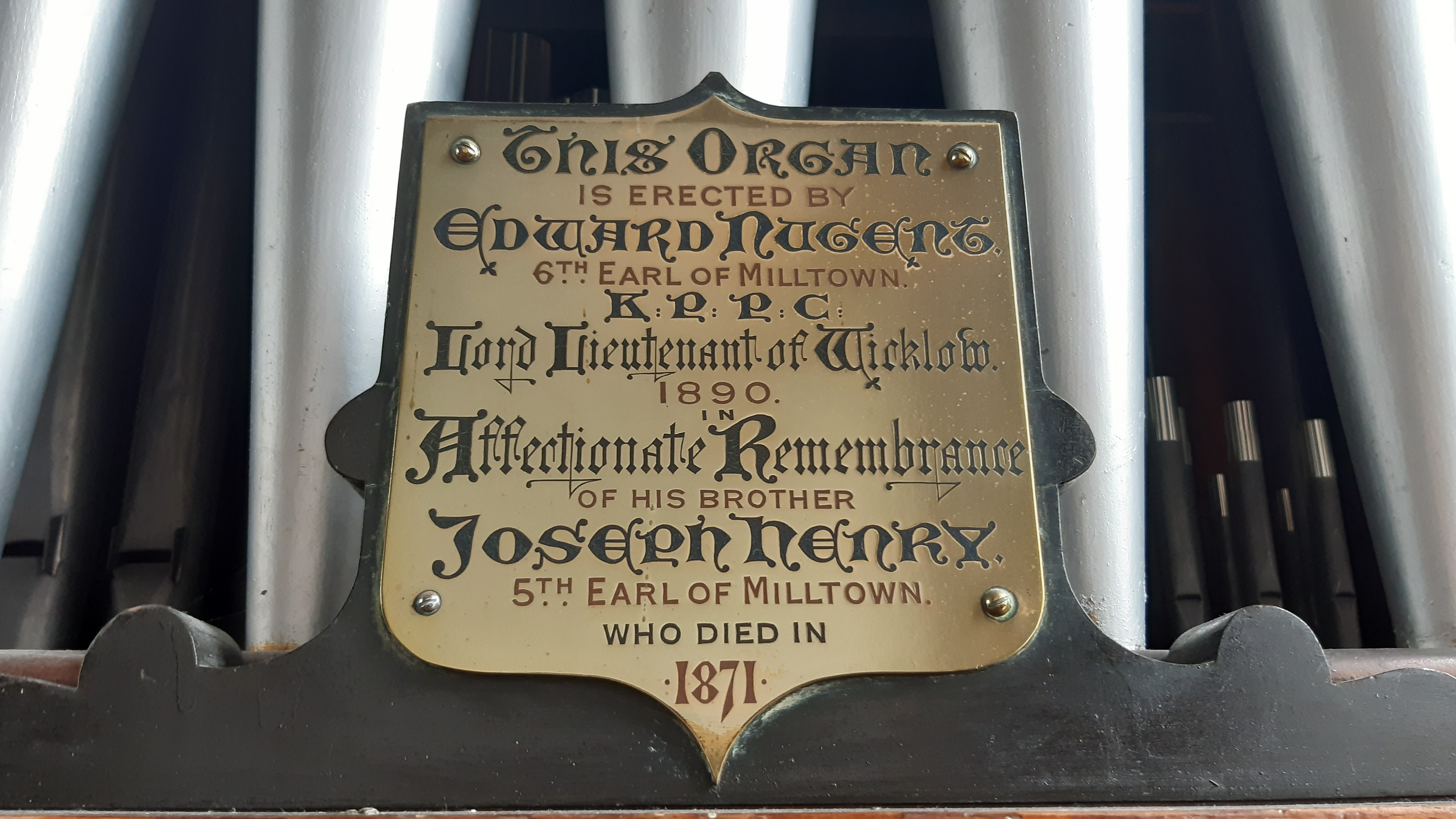
Memorial plaque erected by Edward Leeson, 6th Earl of Milltown

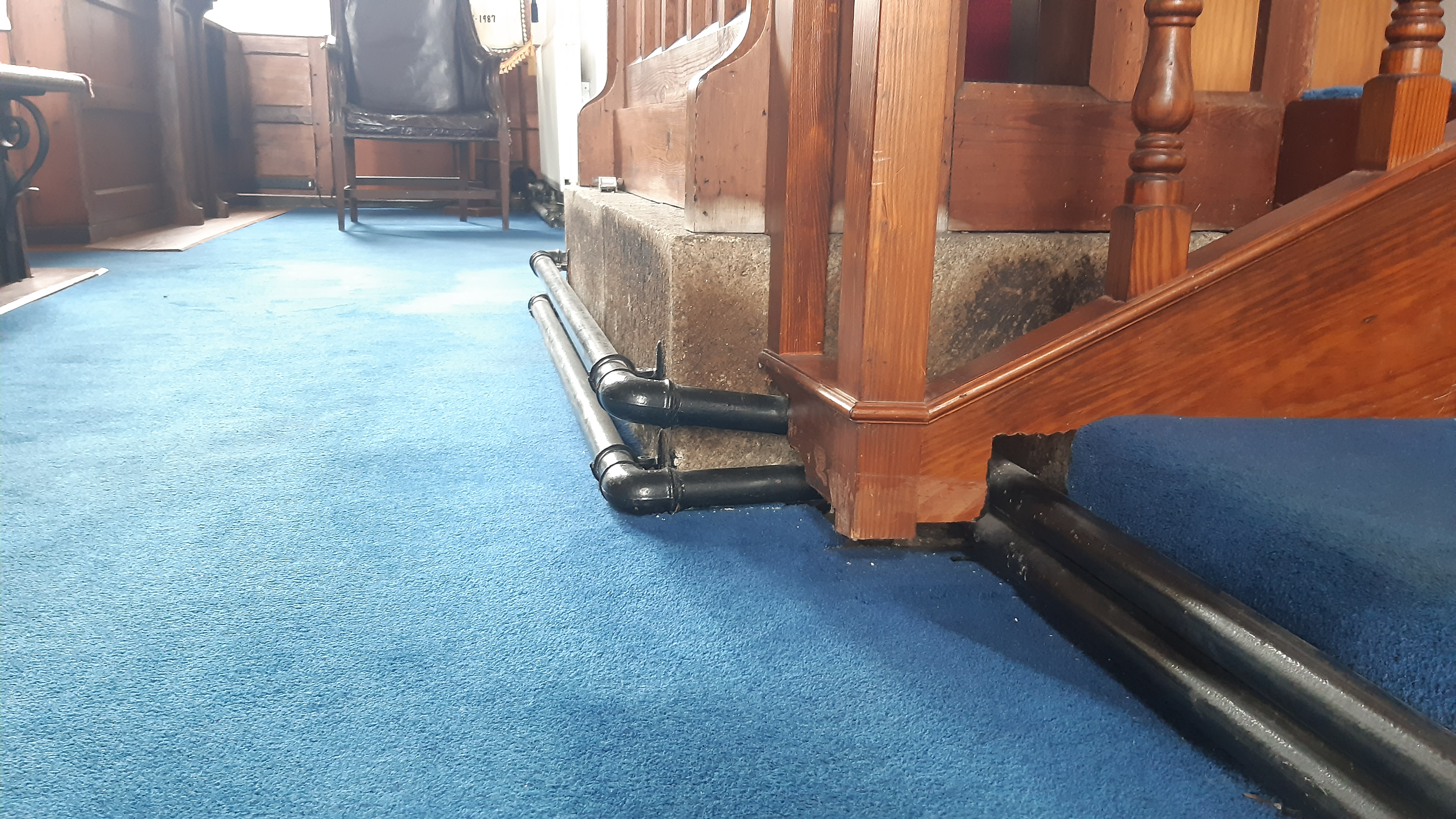
Retro-fitted heating system

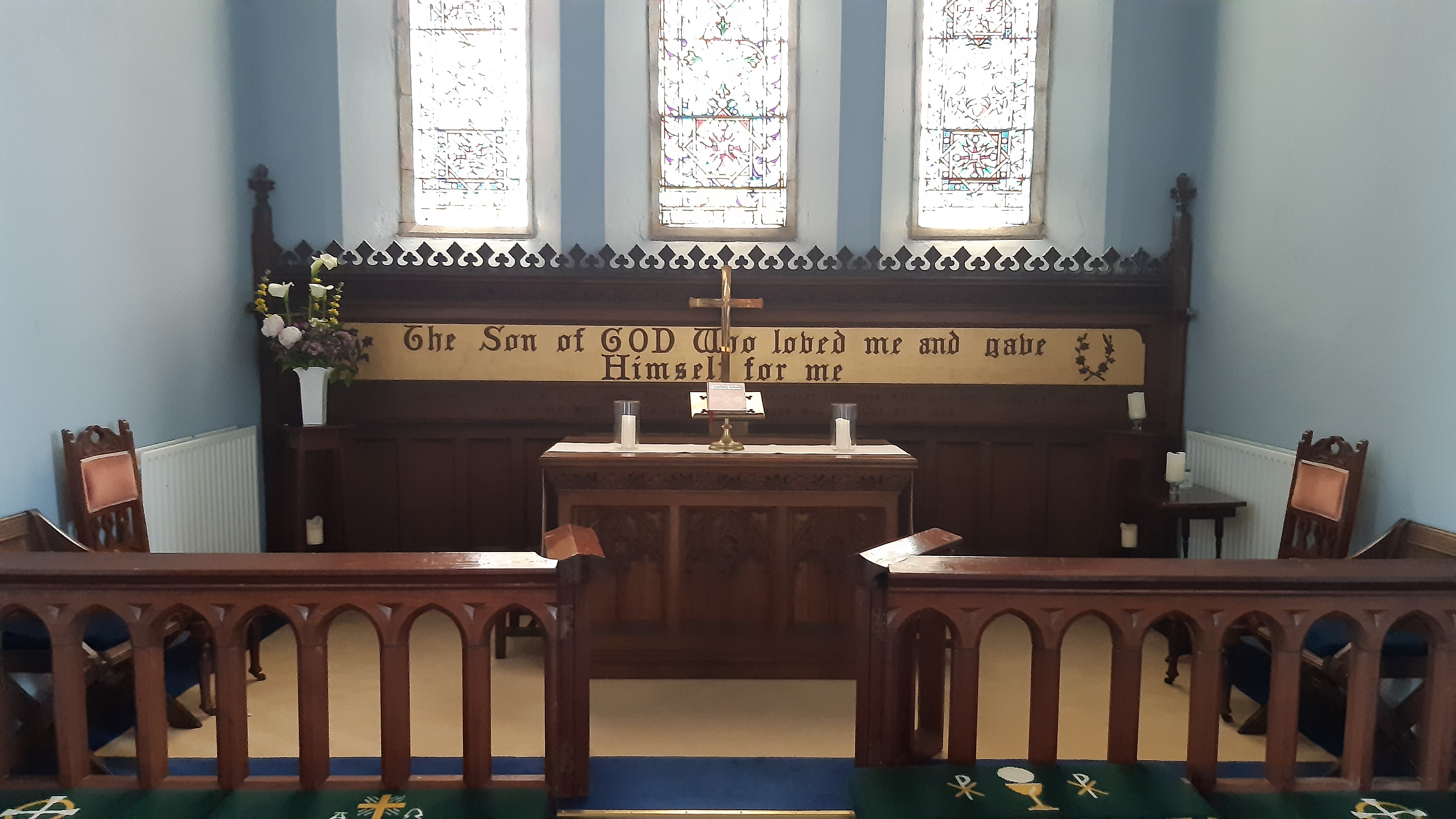
The altar

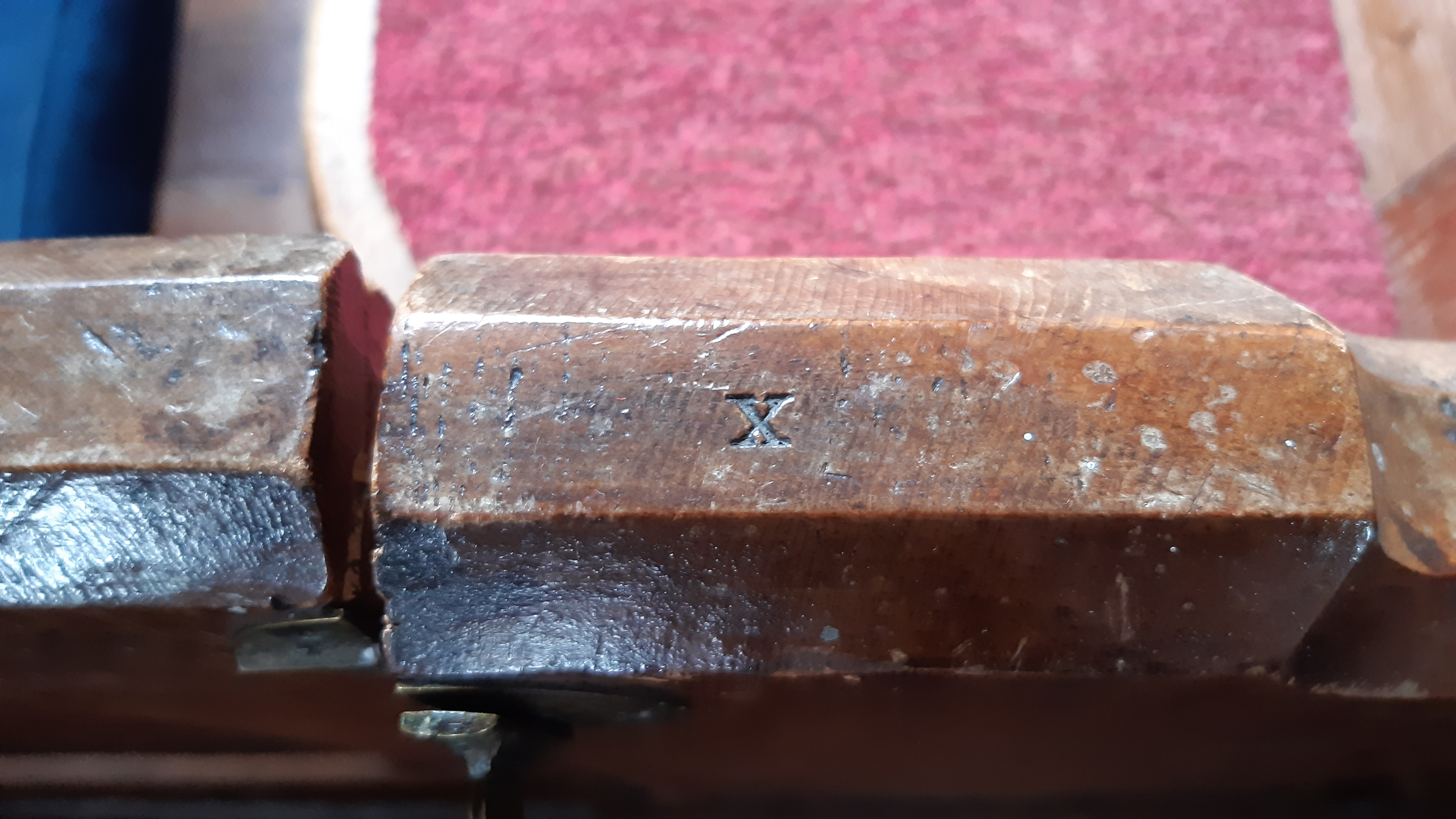
Roman numeral numberings on the different pews

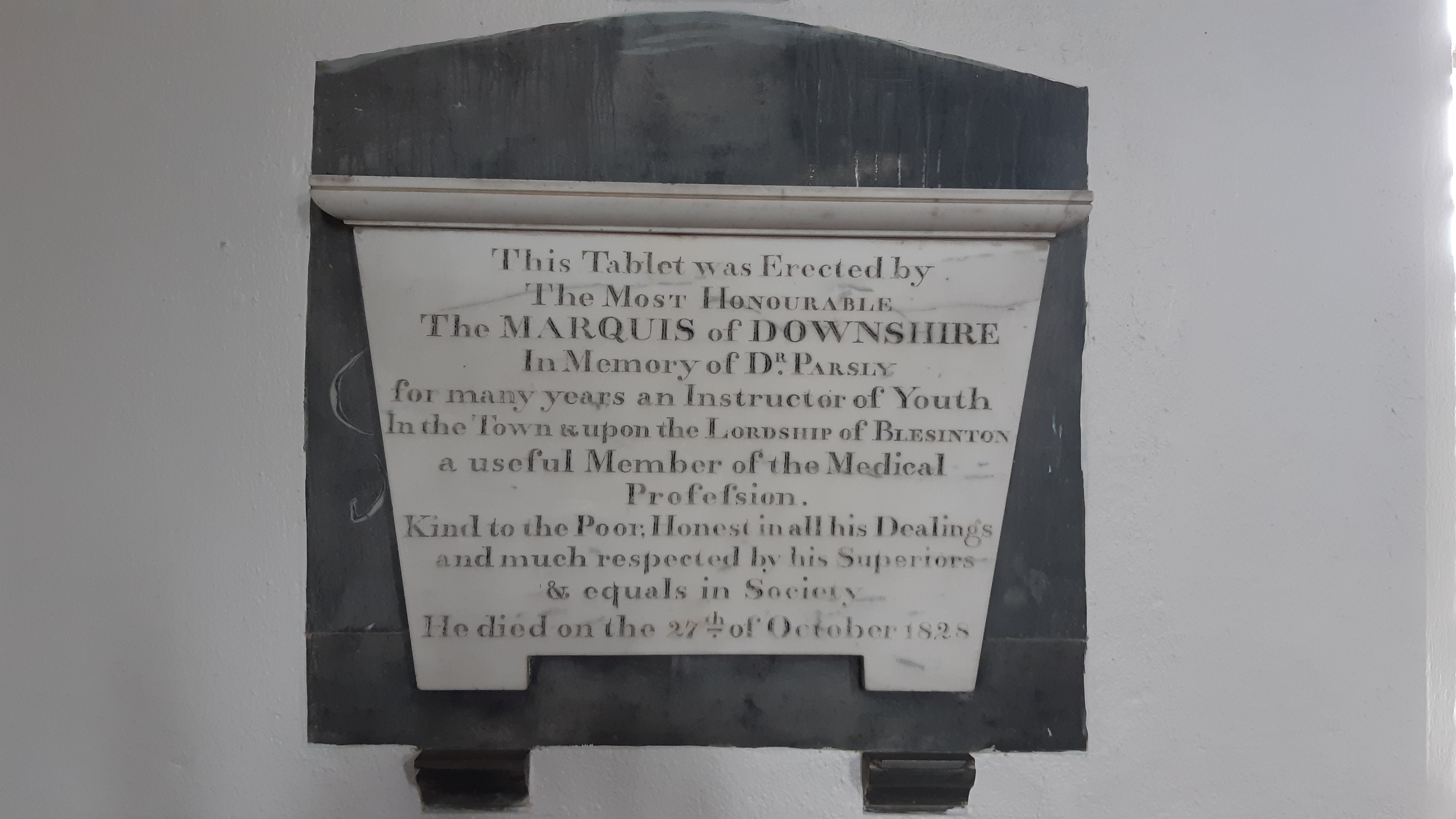
One of many memorial plaques in the church

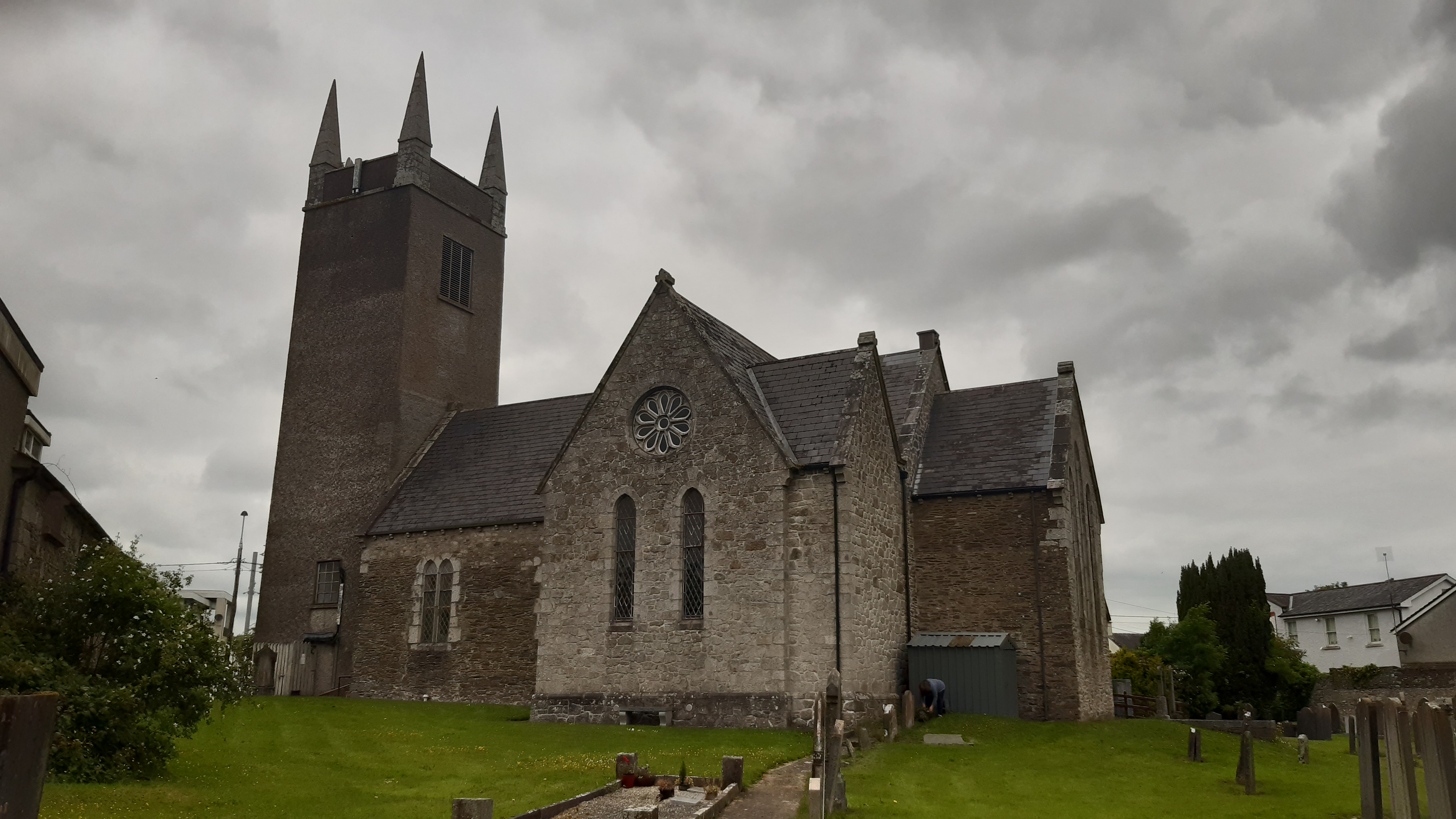
Looking northwards towards the church from within the graveyard

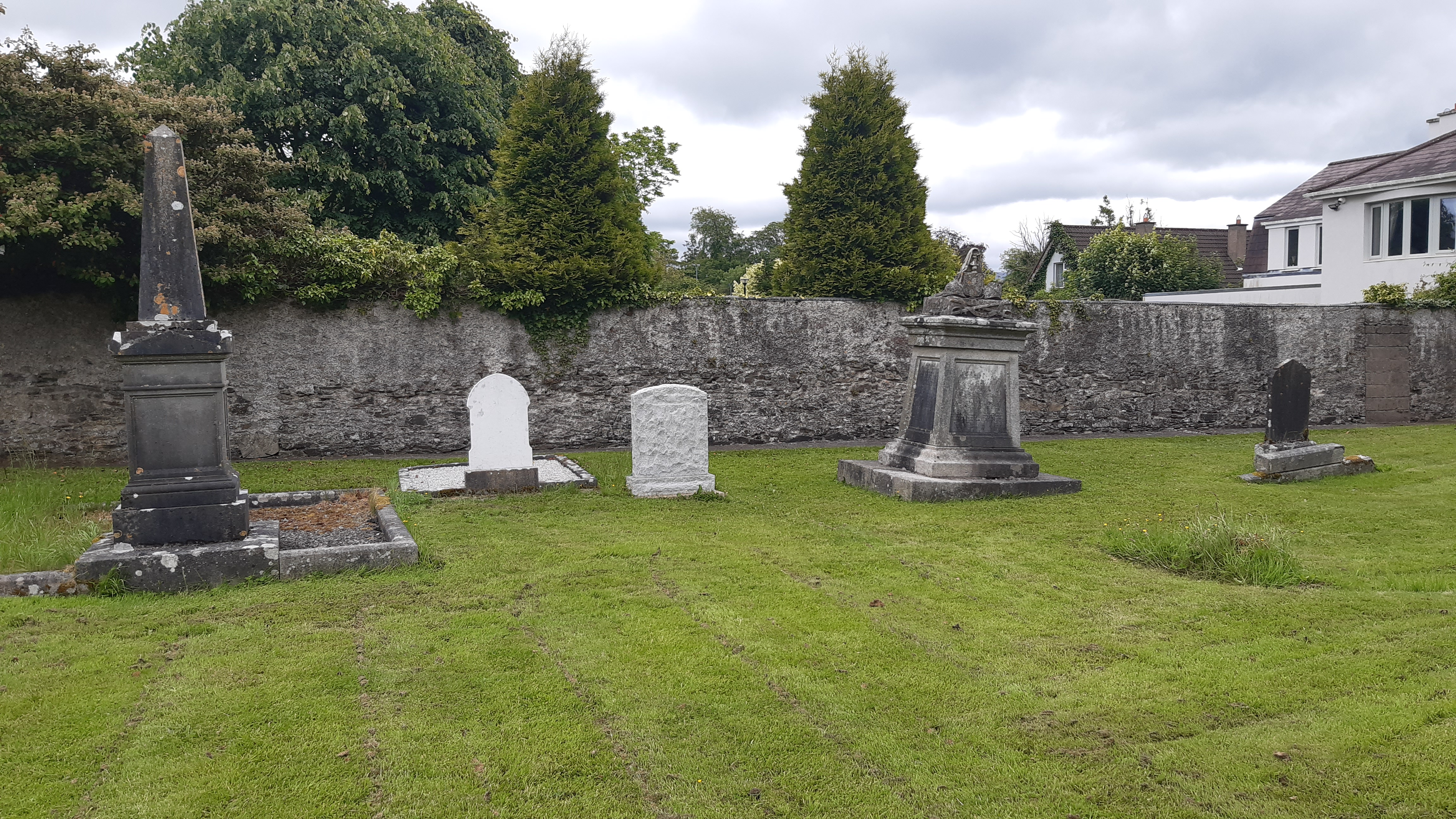
Gravestones from different centuries
