= Ballyknockan quarry =

Former granite quarrying complex in County Wicklow, Ireland

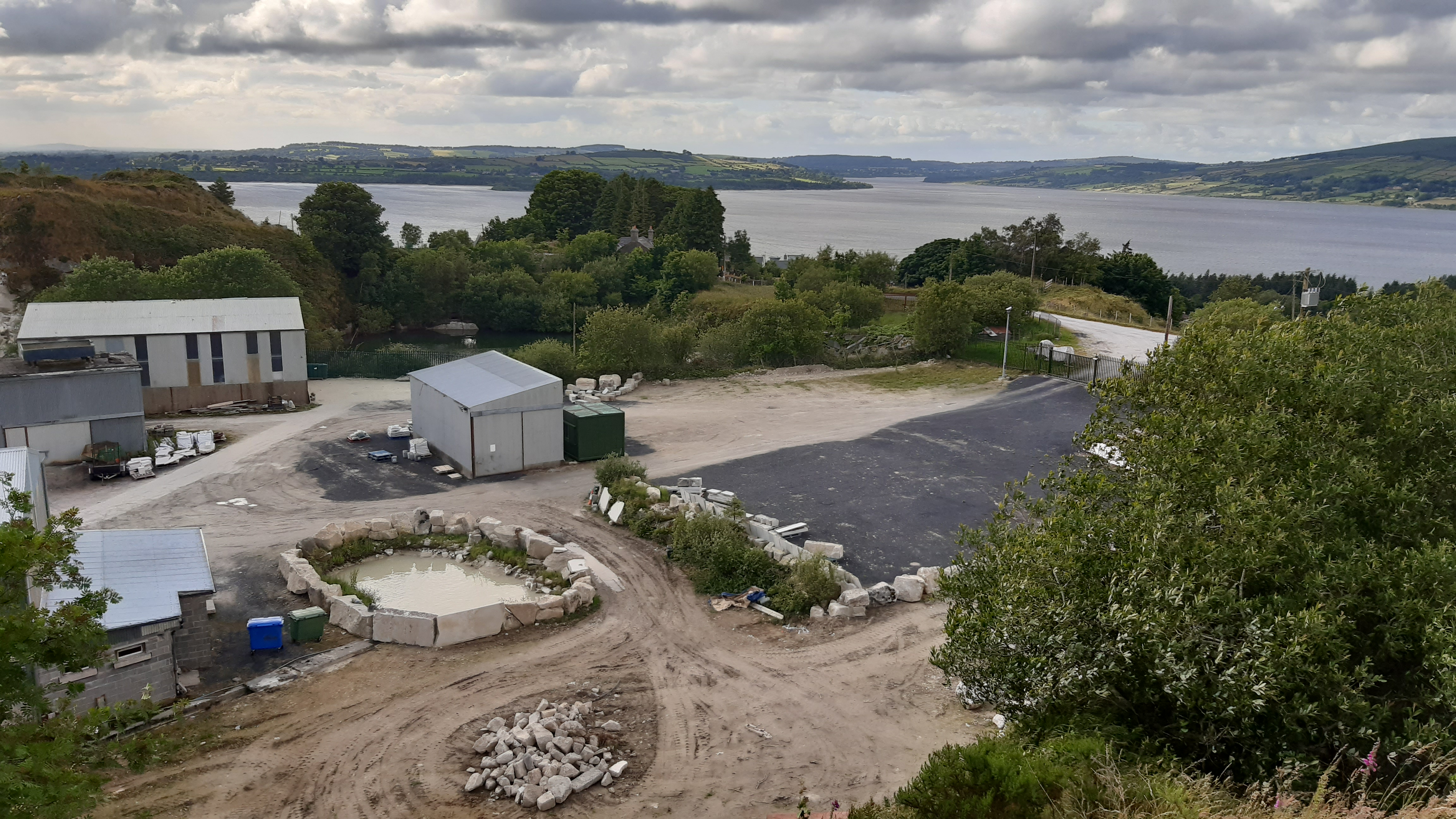
- A view of the main quarry, formerly known as Creedon's quarry, (and before that Olligan's) with Poulaphouca Reservoir in the background

- Location within Ireland
- Location: Ballyknockan, Blessington, County Wicklow, Ireland; 53.1033°N 6.4952°W
- Products: Granite
- Opened: 1824
- Closed: Between 1966 and 2015

Ballyknockan quarry, or more correctly Ballyknockan quarries, are a collection of disused granite quarries in the village of Ballyknockan, County Wicklow, Ireland. From the early 19th century onward, the site was "probably the most important area for supplying cut stone blocks of granite for the construction of many of Dublin city's major public buildings", according to a report by the Geological Survey of Ireland. At its height, from approximately the 1840s to 1870s, there would have been "hundreds of workers" active in various trades in the quarries, which lie some 15 miles south-west of Dublin city. Transportation of the materials alone to the city by horse and cart required considerable logistical effort.

According to most sources, the quarries were founded in the year 1824. The Ballyknockan community celebrated the bicentennial of the founding of the quarries in 2024 with the opening of a new museum. Granite is no longer quarried onsite, but the mountainsides are still "littered with stray chunks of granite" which stonemasons use to produce monumental orders, as well as using stockpiled and locally imported stone.

The village of Ballyknockan was largely built with granite from the quarries, and became known as Wicklow's "Granite Village", or "the Rockery of the Garden of Ireland". Extant stone buildings in the village today demonstrate the skills of the stonemasons who built them.

== Background ==
The granite in the Wicklow Mountains, wherein Ballyknockan sits, is of Devonian age dating to around 400 million years ago and is part of what is known as the 'Leinster granite batholith' which stretches from Killiney Hill in Dublin southwards to County Carlow. Granite has also been exploited on the island of Ireland in counties Galway, Donegal and Down. According to Patrick Wyse Jackson, curator of the Geological Museum in Trinity College, close examination of Ballknockan granite reveals its constituent minerals, which include:

"...pale, glassy quartz, milky feldspars, and black and silvery micas. The Ballyknockan variety is medium- to coarse-grained, with interlocking crystals some three to four millimetres in size. Apart from the minerals mentioned above, the granite also contains some chlorite".

The wider Dublin area was exploited for its granite long before the 1820s when the Ballyknockan quarries were established, and it is known that granite quarrying took place at Dalkey quarry, close to Dublin city, from 1680. Granite was commonly known as "firestone" until the late eighteenth century; not from its classification as an igneous rock (which at this stage was still unknown), but rather from its initial usage as a material from which to make fire grates and chimney pieces owing to its heat-resistant properties.

Prior to 1720, calp limestone was the main stone building material used in Dublin, and was quarried locally in the suburbs of Palmerstown, Kimmage, Rathgar and Donnybrook (where a Dublin Bus depot has existed since 1952). After this date, imported limestones, sandstones and granites began to replace the calp as they became more popular. The nearest granite sources to Dublin were the quarries of south County Dublin and north-west County Wicklow, which, however close, still required the costly and labour-intensive transport of stone to the city, especially when via overland haulage (as was the only option for Ballyknockan haulers).

The operation of moving the materials to the building sites of Dublin required raising large blocks of hewn stone (in blocks of up to a quarter-ton) onto a wooden blockwheel cart (aka the 'Irish carr') using hand-powered lifting tackle. According to Hussey, the Irish carr was "the standard transport vehicle used in Ireland until the early nineteenth century".

The eighteenth century, "probably Dublin's most prosperous period" according to Wyse Jackson, saw the erection of many of Dublin's most important public buildings which were built of calp limestone rubble walls and "faced with either Leinster granite or Portland stone" imported from England. Granite from the Wicklow and Dublin Mountains, and limestone from the immediate hinterland, came to be the primary stones used in the construction of Dublin city, and can be recognised as "characteristic to Dublin" in the same way that basalt from County Antrim and granite from the Mourne Mountains came to typify Belfast's urban landscape.

=== Local quarrying in the 1700s ===
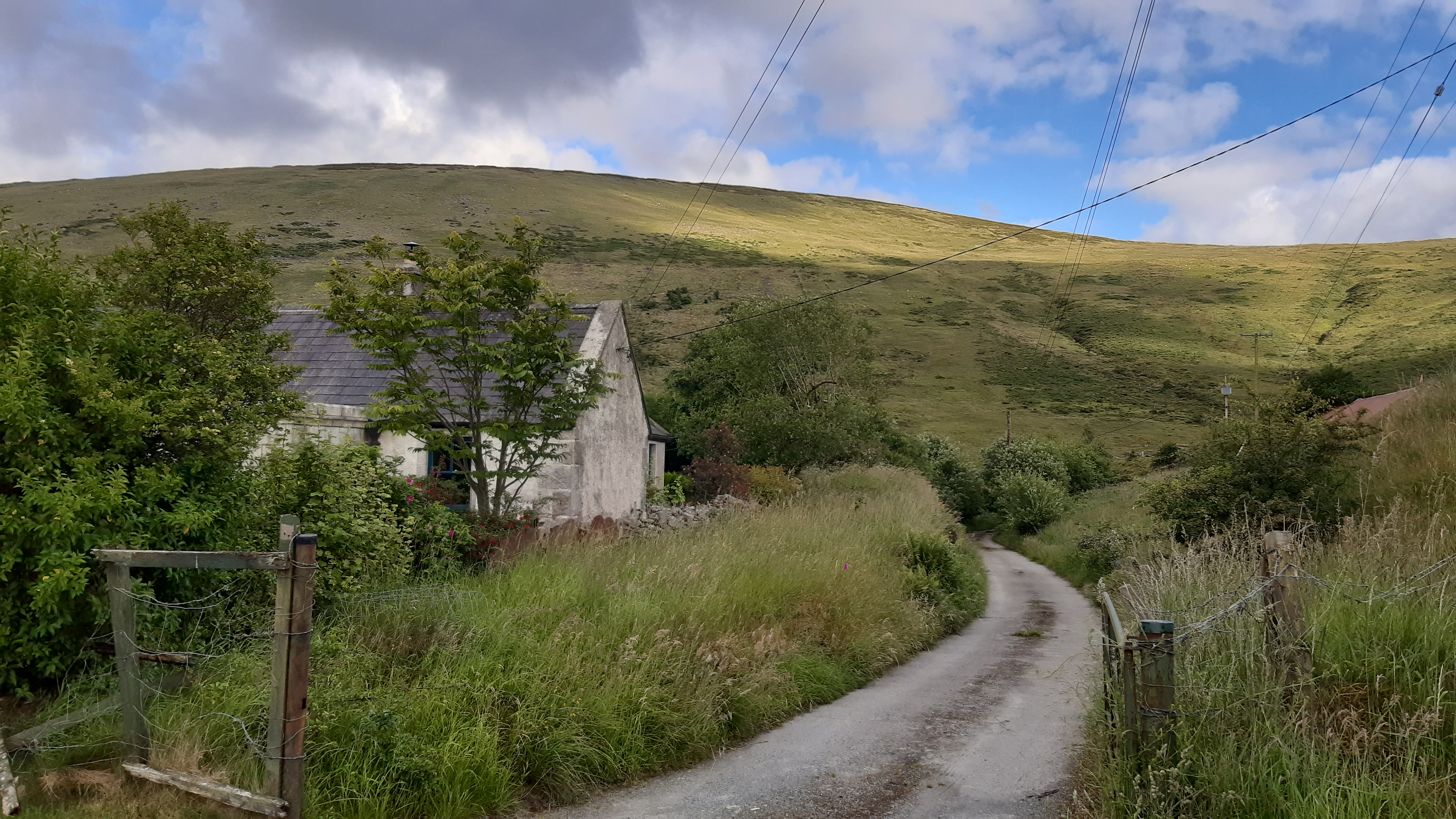
A road at the back of the main Ballyknockan quarry leading to another disused quarry, with Silsean mountain in the distance

According to Wyse Jackson and Caulfield, "Granite was reportedly first quarried in west Wicklow in the early 1700s from several openings at Baltyboys near Blessington, and from 1740 in more significant volumes at Woodend and Threecastles nearby and then from Golden Hill" near the village of Manor Kilbride.

According to Wyse Jackson and Caulfield, the ability to quarry granite in considerable volume was delayed in Ireland until the mid-1700s due to technological constraints.

Stones from the west Wicklow sources, especially Golden Hill, were used in the construction of many important Dublin buildings, including Parliament House on College Green, Daly's Club, the entrance to Trinity College Dublin, the Provost's House at Trinity College, the Royal College of Surgeons and the east side of Leinster House, all constructed in the 1700s.

A detailed map of the Blessington area produced by Jacob Neville in 1760 shows quarries at Golden Hill and Oldcourt, but no quarrying at Ballyknockan. At that stage there was not even a road to the village, although by 1771 it is known that a small community were living onsite in a clachan, or hamlet, as a list of occupying families exists for that year.

== 19th century ==
=== Pre-1824 (Year of establishment) ===
The un-dated County Geological Site Report by the Geological Survey of Ireland states that quarrying began in Ballyknockan in 1824, a date supported by other sources. Some other sources give an earlier date of 1820 as the starting year.

The decision to quarry at Ballyknockan began either as a result of the exhaustion of the granite quarry at Golden Hill, or as a result of the local landowner there not renewing the licence. In any case, a group of 400 men were led by a man with the surname of 'Olligan' (some sources also give the surname as 'Holligan', or 'Halligan') from the site near Manor Kilbride on an "exodus of near biblical proportions" to Ballyknockan, a journey of about 11 km as the crow flies (in a straight line over Lugnagun hill).

According to the Wicklow People, "Olligan and his workers made the move because the stone around Golden Hill in Kilbride was running out and awareness was growing of how fine the granite (was) up in the mountains". As explained in a local exhibition in 2018 focusing on the local stonecutting tradition:

"Local oral history says that as it became apparent that the supply of stone in Oldcourt and Golden Hill was dwindling in the 1820s, Paul Duffy and Patrick Olligan came to prospect for a new site in Ballyknockan. The stone in Ballyknockan seemed superior to their supply in Golden Hill/Oldcourt and Ballyknockan had the added advantage of belonging to the same landlord as their sites in Kilbride, the Cobbe Family."

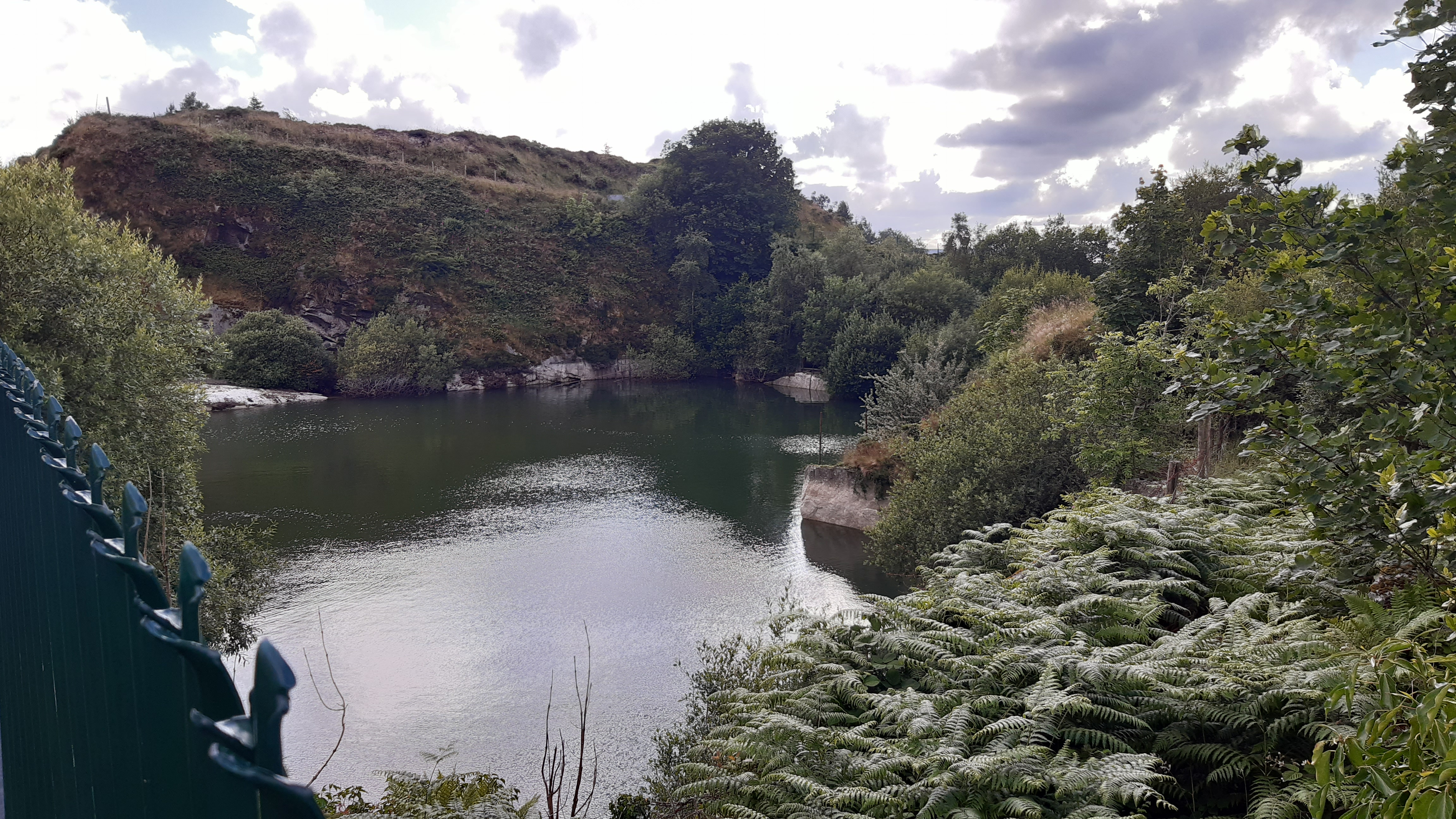
A flooded quarry lake adjacent to the main quarry at Ballyknockan

The main quarry at Ballyknockan came to be known as Olligan's (Note: As of 2015 it was trading as Creedon's). It is thought that until at least the late 1830s, many of the workers who had switched to working in Ballyknockan still lived in the Golden Hill area and walked the lengthy distance to Ballyknockan every day and back.

The new workers eventually constructed houses for themselves in Ballyknockan, which, according to O'Reilly, are "unusually well-constructed lime-mortared houses and outbuildings, made possible by the high quality of the local granite and the skills of the resident stone-cutters". Ballyknockan did not have a church of its own, and so the inhabitants were subsumed into the parish of Blackditches with its church at Valleymount.

While these dwellings were "often simple enough", according to historian Christiaan Corlett, "they frequently feature beautiful granite chimneys as well as formal barge stones at the gables". Corlett contends that most of the Ballyknockan roofs would have been weatherproofed using thatch, which was the most common form of roofing in County Wicklow until about the 1930s when galvanised sheets began to take over.

=== 1824 to 1840s (Beginnings) ===
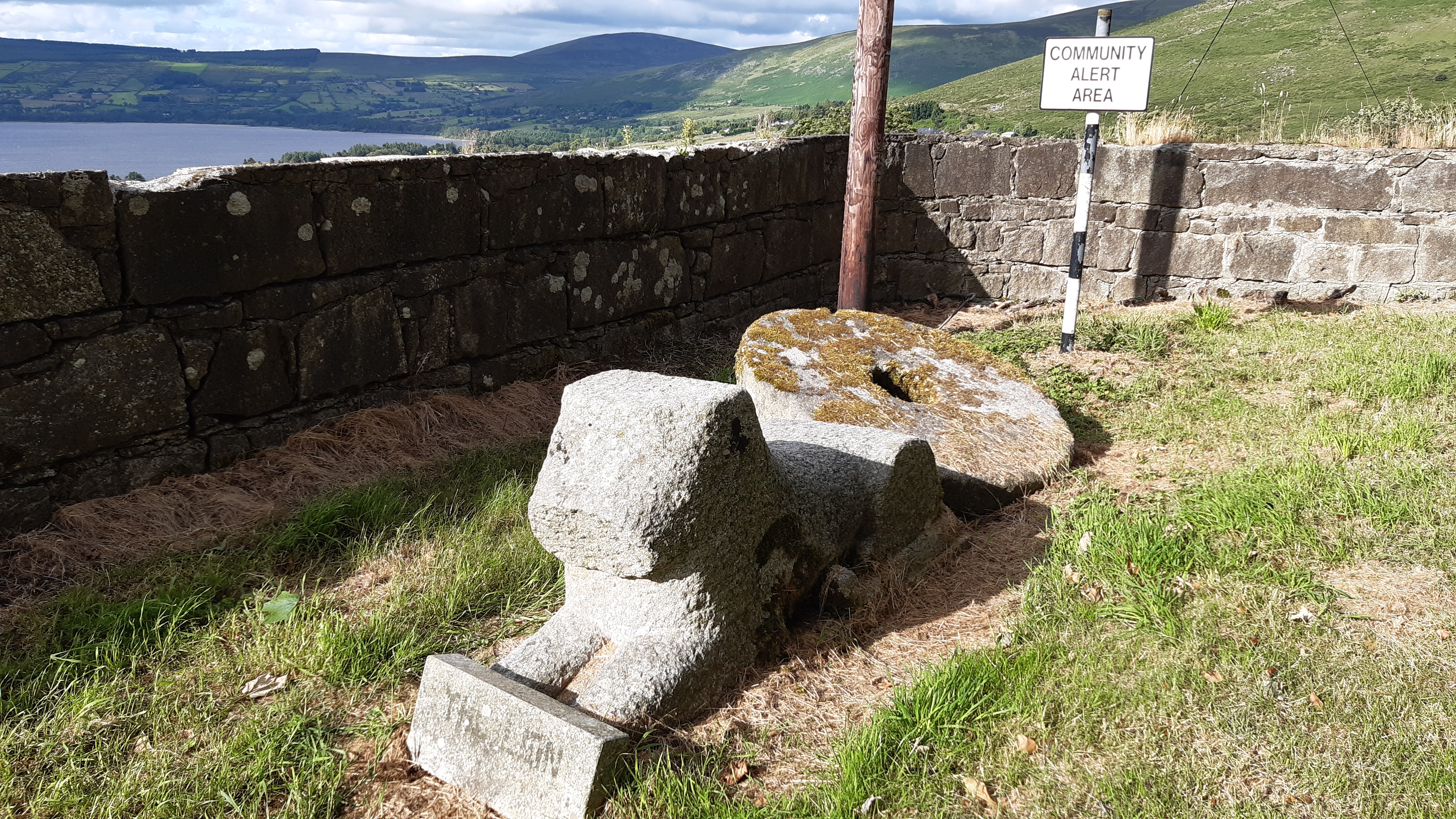
The remains of an abandoned lion reputedly once intended for use at Stormont in Belfast

What has been described as a "second great wave of public building" began in Dublin in the second quarter of the 19th century, necessitating much granite from a local source. The Irish Times notes that the "first phase of large-scale quarrying began" at Ballyknockan in the 1820s.

Stone from Ballyknockan was used in the construction of parts of Trinity College Dublin in 1832, and beginning from about 1836, large granite slabs were used to line the sloped embankments (about 30 feet in height) of Brittas pond near Brittas, County Dublin in order to prevent water from escaping the floor and sides of the artificial lake.

Stone from Ballyknockan was used "extensively" in the building of Dublin churches in the 1830s, including St Francis Xavier's (1832), St Andrew's (1837), and St Paul's on Arran Quay (1837). A lesser known church building which demonstrates the Ballyknockan stonecutter's skill around the same time is St. Joseph's Church in Valleymount (close to Ballyknockan), which was built in a "Mexican" style in 1803, but with "a distinctive pinnacled front façade and porch added c.1835".

In 1838, surveyors from the Ordnance Survey of Ireland visited Ballyknockan in preparation for the creation of their first Ordnance Survey maps, and noted 160 men in the village working onsite across three quarries. They remarked of the quarry(ies): "...the best in this part of the kingdom, and has been in use for the last 14 years." The surveyors made note of just two roads running through Ballyknockan, both being of a poor standard. Between the 1830s and 1890s, mapping evidence shows considerable improvements made to these roadways, as was the case elsewhere in rural Ireland too.

In 1839, architect J. S. Mulvaney utilised Ballyknockan granite for the construction of Kingstown railway station (modern day Dún Laoghaire railway station) in Dublin.

=== 1840s to 1870s (Peak production) ===
The quarry reached its peak output during the period of the 1840s-1870s, according to information boards produced for a local exhibition in 2018 held in Valleymount community hall.

In 1840, one Christopher McEvoy started quarrying in Ballyknockan, but waited until 1865 to register the quarry, paying the sum of ten shillings to do so. Christopher had already served his time as a stonecutter at the quarry before taking it over from a man called Daniel Farrington, according to the Wicklow People, however it is not stated which exact quarry this refers to. As of 2015, descendants of the same Christopher McEvoy were still working onsite at Ballyknockan.

The area surrounding Ballyknockan was not as badly affected by the Great Irish Famine of 1845 to 1852 as other parts of Ireland, since the people were engaged in an employment economy rather than the subsistence economy prevalent elsewhere. Contrary to much of Ireland, the population actually grew during the period, from 351 inhabitants in 1841 to 430 in 1851.

Mary Immaculate, Refuge of Sinners Church in Rathmines, Dublin built between 1850 and 1856, was constructed using granite from Ballyknockan as well as calp limestone from quarries in Kimmage as well as Donnybrook.

By the time of Griffith's Valuation, which visited in 1852, there were four quarries, operated by the following men:

- Patrick Holligan (Olligan), (who subsequently died in 1853. The quarry was taken over by Patrick O'Reilly)
- Brian Hanlon (taken over by James Freeman in 1862)
- Patrick O'Reilly (taken over by Peter Bryan in 1862)
- John Brady

The Museum Building at Trinity College Dublin, built between 1853 and 1857, was constructed primarily of calp limestone which was "faced externally with blocks, nine inches thick, of Ballyknockan granite", as per Wyse Jackson. Ballyknockan stone was also used for the chimneys on the building, making up their "hidden inner ranks" while Portland stone was used for the outer series of chimneys, visible from ground level. As of 1995, Wyse Jackson noted that many of the exposed Portland stone surfaces in the building were by then "heavily encrusted with gypsum on which sooty deposits (had) adhered, and similar, but not as extensive, contaminants encrust(ed) the Ballyknockan granite ashlar".

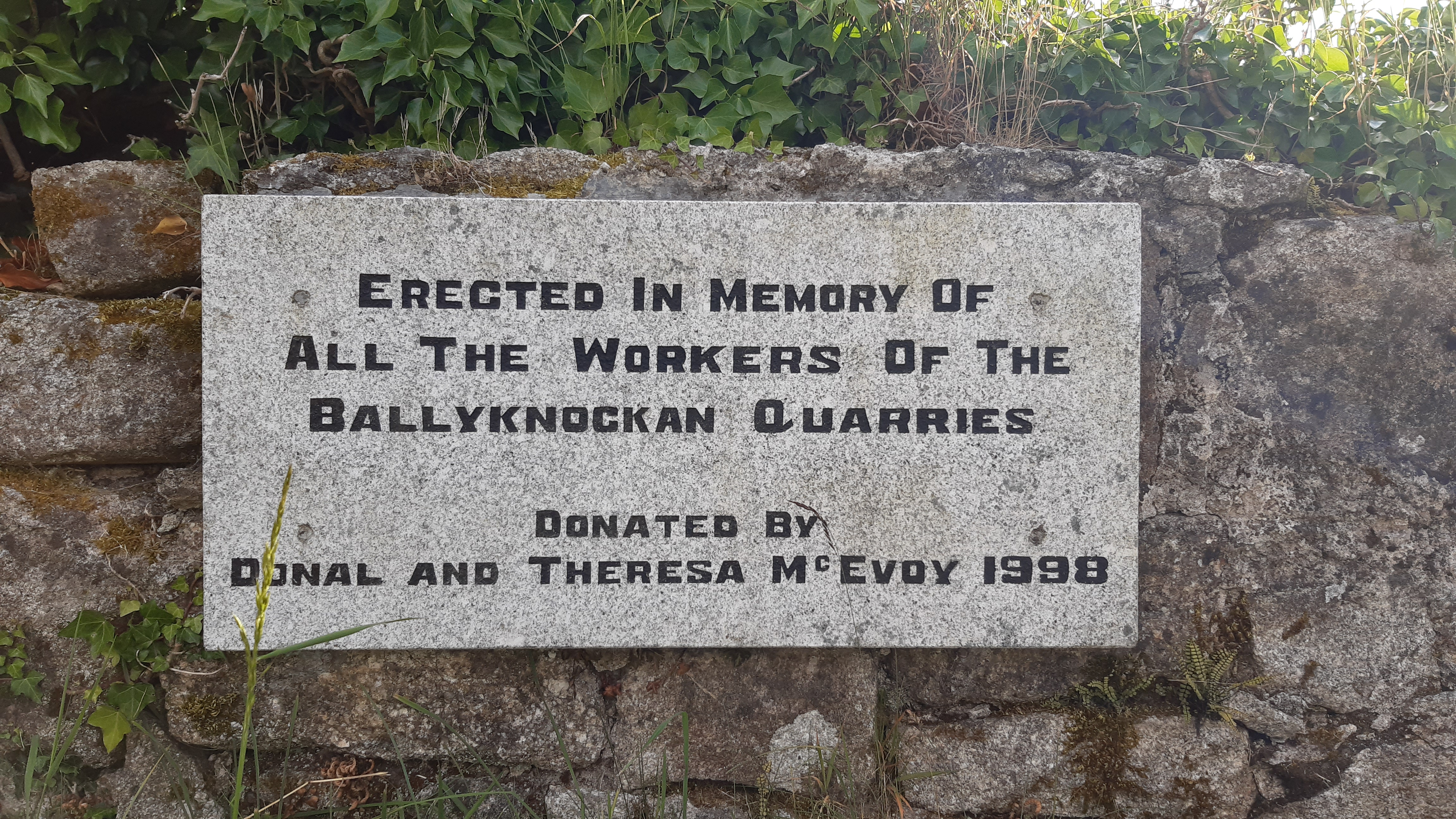
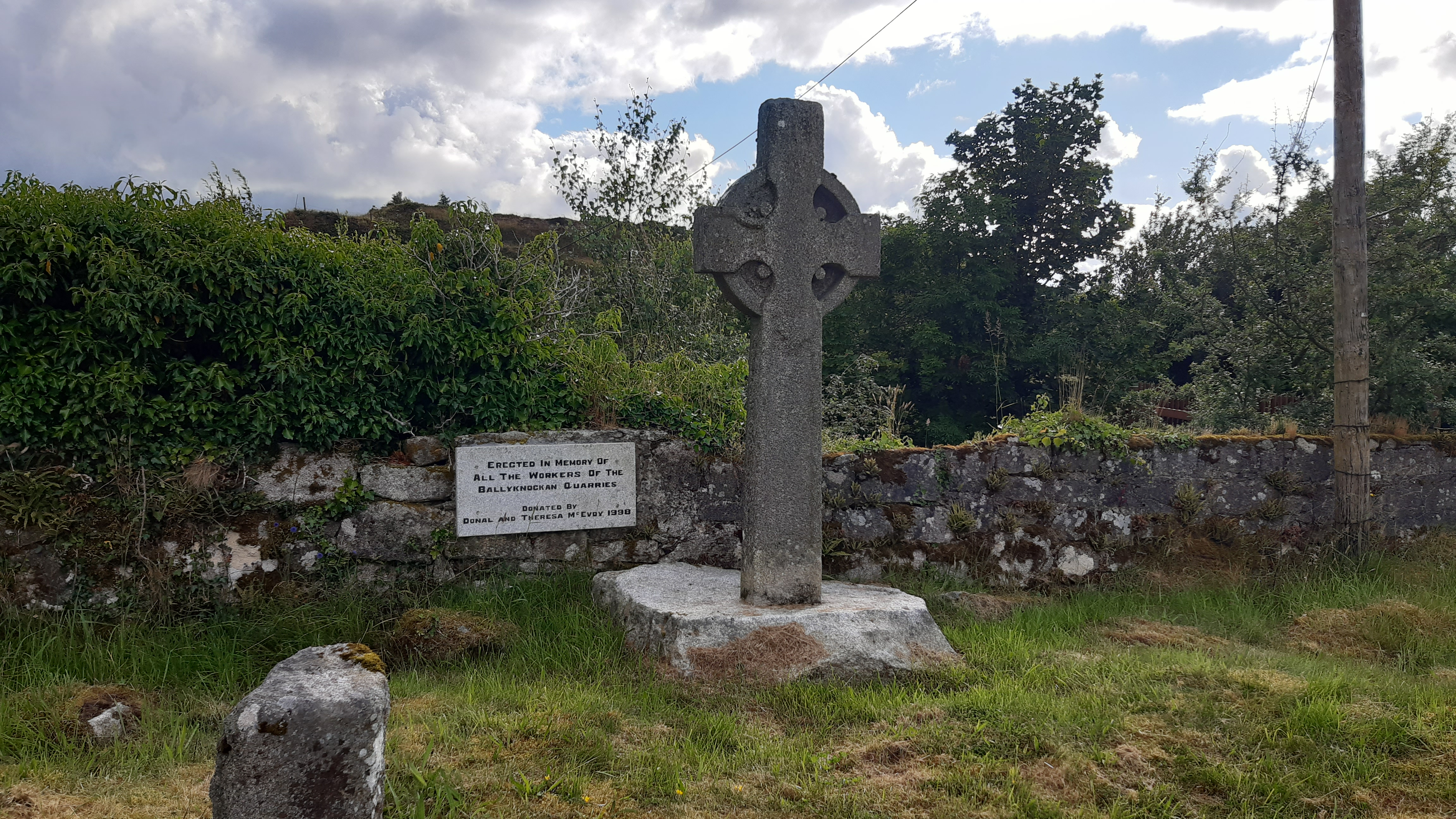
A plaque and high cross erected by Donal and Theresa McEvoy in 1998 "In memory of all the workers of the Ballyknockan Quarries"

On 7 November 1853, Patrick Olligan died. His obituary in the Freeman's Journal of 11 November read:

"The friends of native industry will hear with regret the demise of Mr. Patrick Olligan, the proprietor and skilful worker of the extensive granite stone quarries at Ballyknockan... the name of Patrick Olligan has been long identified with perfection in granite stone masonry in and around the city of Dublin, and to his liberality, industry and enterprise we are indebted for the free introduction of that hitherto deemed intractible (sic) material for the more elaborate details of architectural composition... The railway terminus at King's-bridge, the Midland Great Western terminus, the Drogheda, and other buildings executed by him... are amongst the latest and best specimens of Olligan's mastery over the difficulties of granite masonry..."

By the 1860s, numerous granite quarries were still in operation. Aside from the surnames of Olligan, Holligan, Hanlon, O'Reilly and Brady, other families associated with quarrying over the decades have included Foster, Freeman, Costello, Reilly, and Doyle.

In 1864, Christopher McEvoy is recorded as owning the 7th largest of the ten quarries that were then in existence, eliciting the rent of £5 annually. The quarries (in order of size) were as follows:

- 1. Patrick O'Reilly (1 of 2) - taken over by T. M. O'Reilly (his son) on his death on 7 April 1873 and later partnered with William Osborne
- 2. John Brady
- 3. Patrick O'Reilly (2 of 2) - taken over by T. M. O'Reilly (his son) on his death on 7 April 1873 and later partnered with William Osborne
- 4. James Freeman
- 5. Michael Doyle
- 6. Peter Bryan
- 7. Christopher McEvoy
- 8. James Byrne
- 9. Robert Osborne - taken over by William Osborne by 1874 and later partnered with T. M. O'Reilly
- 10. Michael Nowlan

=== 1870s to end of 1890s ===
In April 1873, Patrick O'Reilly died and his business interests passed to his son Thomas M. O'Reilly. Thomas navigated the company through the Long Depression which lasted from 1873 until 1896, and combined with the Irish Famine of 1879 lead to the Land War. Orders onsite began to lessen, and O'Reilly eventually had to surrender the business to the landlord. The experience incentivised O'Reilly to take part in the agitation of the Land League, for which he was imprisoned for 6 months in Naas jail in 1881.

A brass band, mainly composed of quarry workers, was formed in the 1880s, and existed until the 1950s playing at local festivals and funerals. Initially the songs chosen to play by the group were largely drawn from the classical repertoire and opera, but as the Gaelic League (founded 1893) grew in popularity, and the Long Depression impacted employment in the village, the songs became more patriotic in nature.

In 1889, the McEvoy firm of Ballyknockan supplied the granite used in the construction of All Saints' Church, Raheny. In 2014, John McEvoy, a descendent of the same family, was commissioned to sculpt a granite cross dedicated to Irish doctor Marie Elizabeth Hayes (1874-1908) for a memorial garden in the church.

== 20th century ==
At the Barnacullia quarries, situated on the opposite side of the batholith, the Second Boer War (1899-1902) brought a deep depression to the stoneworkings there, as presumably it did also at Ballyknockan.

Ballyknockan granite was used for the base of a statue to Sam McAllister unveiled on 8 May 1904 in Baltinglass, County Wicklow. McAllister was involved in the 1798 rebellion and a namesake of the Dwyer–McAllister Cottage.

At the outset of the First World War in 1914, many stonecutters from Barnacullia were forced to moved to Wales to find work at the extensive granite quarry at Trefor, leading to the further decline of the quarries there.

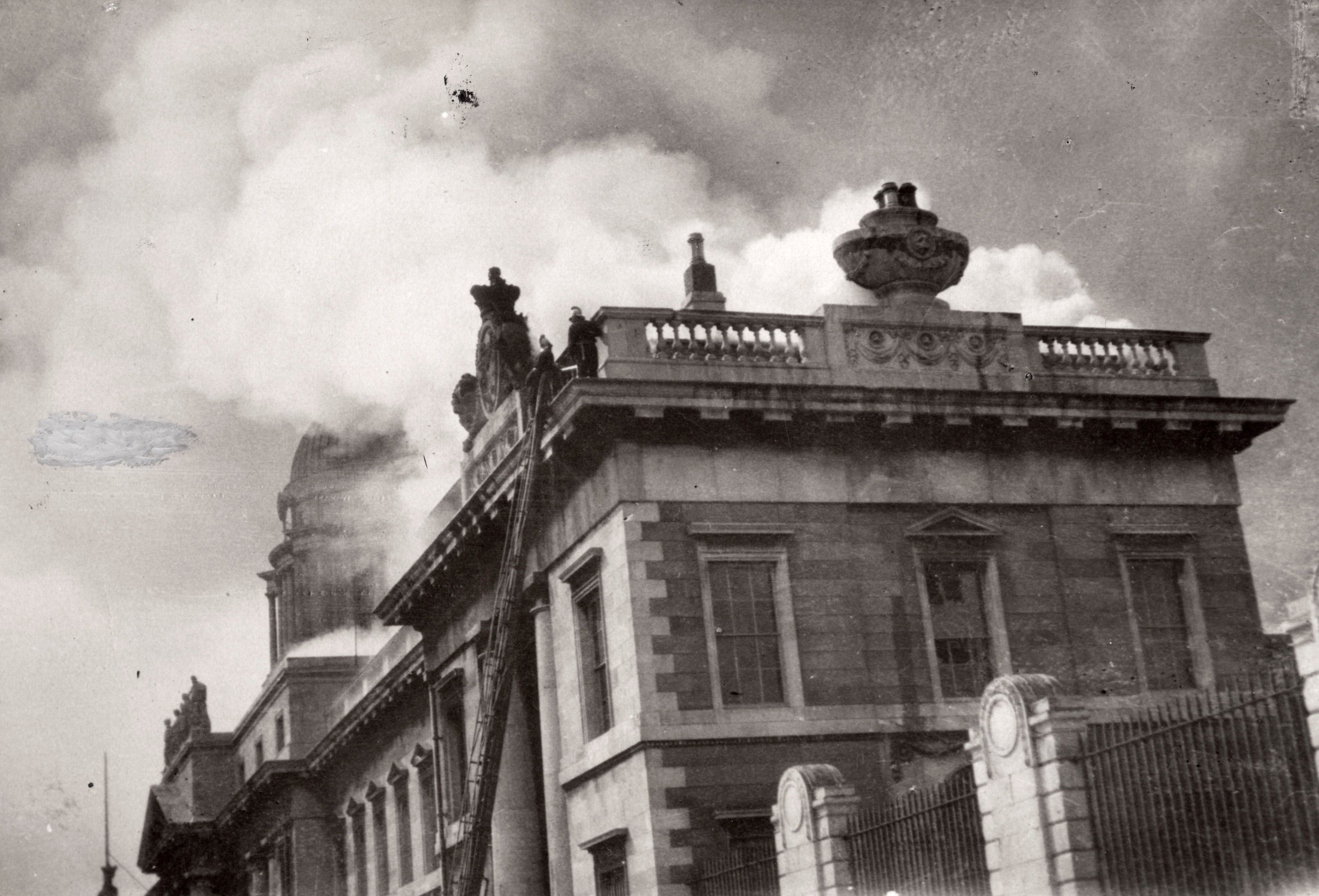
The Custom House, Dublin on fire during the Irish Civil War

After the Irish Civil War ended in 1923, many workers at Barnacullia were employed producing stone for repairing the buildings which had been damaged, such as the GPO, Custom House and Four Courts.

Pictures exist of the Ballyknockan Brass Band celebrating the 1932 Eucharistic Congress at nearby Valleymount church, and marching down O'Connell Street as part of commemorations for the 25th anniversary of the 1916 Rising which took place in 1941.

In 1932, a substantial new quadrangle was added to Clongowes Wood College in Clane, County Kildare, as documented by former-teacher Brendan Cullen in a 2011 publication. These works were "eagerly anticipated... by many locals who looked forward to several years of full employment in what was then a very harsh economic climate". The quadrangle was built of limestone from "Dunne's quarry in Moatfield", located not far from the college. The door and window dressings were made from "reconstructed granite" whereby granite from Ballyknockan was brought to site and crushed into a fine sand, after which it was mixed with cement and poured into the required mould to produce a pseudo stone-like composite that would have been too labour-intensive and expensive to chisel by hand. Cullen mentions that the stonemasons who worked on the job were also from Ballyknockan, and, as no motor cars existed by that stage, and that Ballyknockan lay some 26 km from Clongowes, these workers "stayed locally in digs and drank in local pubs in Clane and in the Royal Oak". Cullen notes that the workers who lodged in Capdoo and Castlebrowne would have probably walked "along the Pale ramparts" (an ancient fortified ditch surrounding Dublin) to get to work.

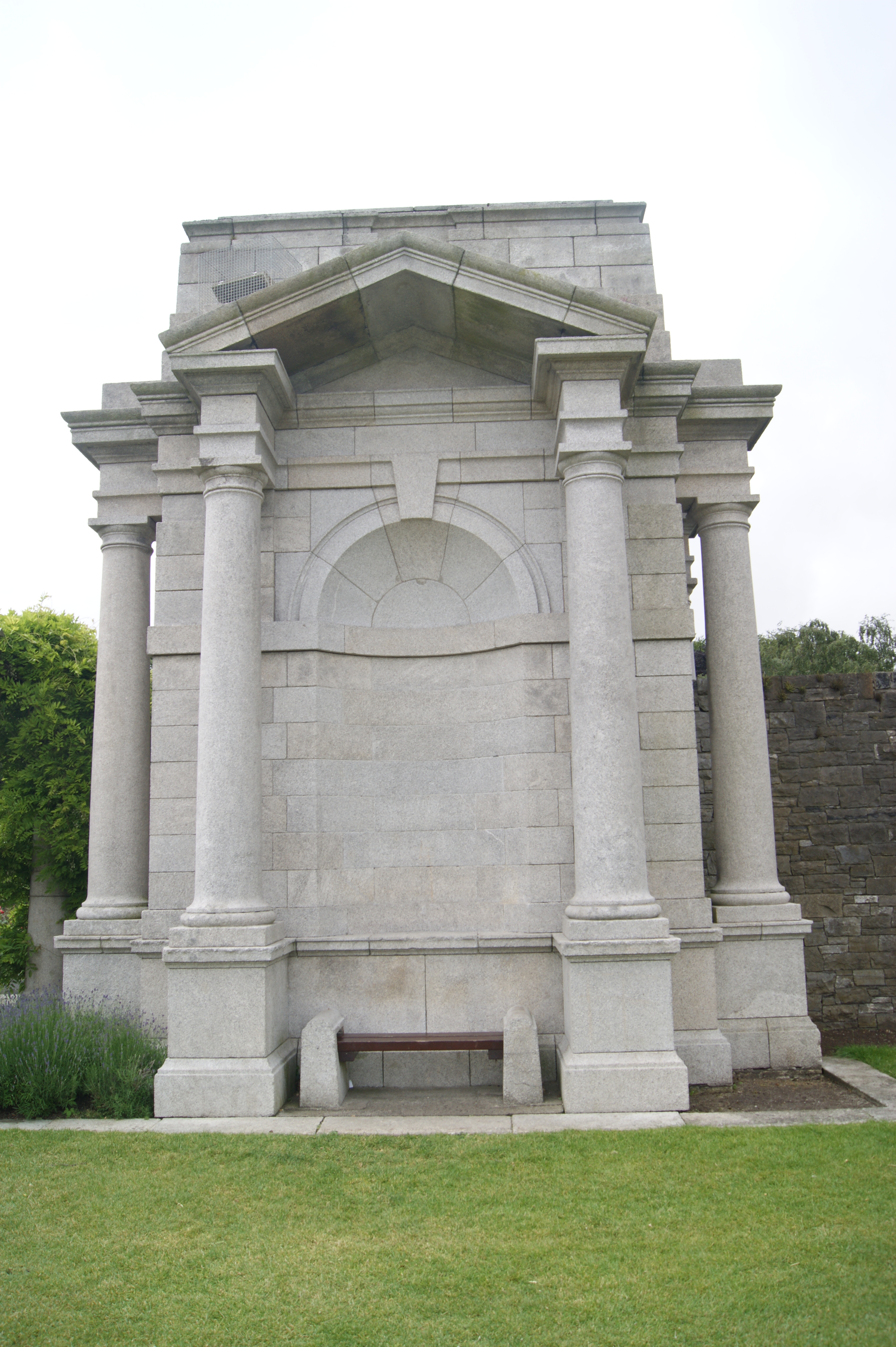
One of the 'bookrooms' at the Irish National War Memorial Gardens, Dublin

Granite for the Irish National War Memorial Gardens, which was begun in 1932 at Islandbridge, Dublin came from Ballyknockan as well as Barnacullia quarries, and the carved stonework was carried out by Irish stonemasons. Stone from Ballyknockan was also cut and manufactured to be sent to the west of Ireland for the construction of a Galway dry docks in an unspecified year.

A new church building boom took hold again from the 1930s, with many of these being built from granite. Jim Murphy from Barnacullia recalled that for the commission for Mullingar Cathedral (built 1933-1936), roughly 200 stone cutters were employed at various quarries all over Three Rock Mountain.

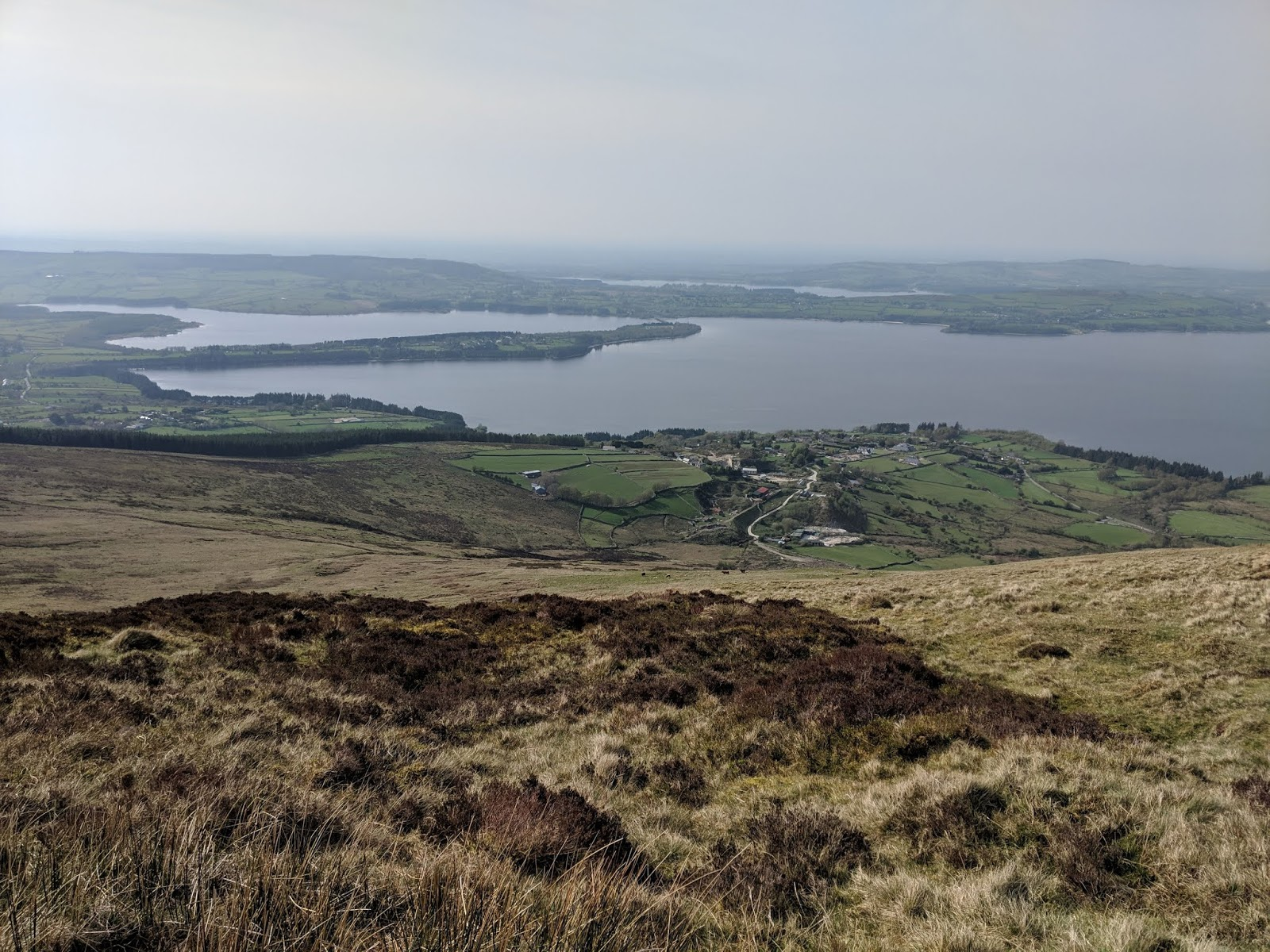
Ballyknockan, with Poulaphouca Reservoir in the background, as viewed from Silsean hill in 2019

Between 1937 and 1940, the vast Liffey valley below the quarries was flooded in order to create Poulaphouca Reservoir, changing the landscape and vista from the quarries forever.

From 1960 until at least 1993, concrete buildings in Dublin were "usually" still being "covered with a thin veneer or cladding of cut stone" (rarely more than 2 cm thick), according to Wyse Jackson, utilising "granite and other igneous rocks, from Wicklow, or imported from Scandinavia, Brazil and elsewhere". This was noted at the International Financial Services Centre (IFSC) in 1993 where "native and imported granites are used side by side".

Engineer and historian John Hussey contends that the quarrying works at Ballyknockan ceased in 1966, and it is known that by 1965, the population in Ballyknockan had reduced to just 71 inhabitants. Wyse Jackson on the other hand noted that granite was still being quarried at Ballyknockan by 1993, and a 1994 entry in the 'Directory of Active Quarries, Pits and Mines in Ireland' calculated that the quarry still had the capacity to yield "2,400 tpa (tonnes per annum)".

In 1981, the quarry was visited by a film crew for inclusion in the episode of the TV series Hands entitled 'Stone'. Éamonn Mac Thomáis, the episode's narrator, noted a cloud passing over Creedon's quarry from afar, and opined that the Ballyknockan area was "Osborne and Brady country" in comparison to the many Doyles and Malones who worked Three Rock Mountain and the granite quarries of the Dublin side. The episode showed large blocks of granite being lifted out of Creedon's quarry by crane, while Mac Thomáis mused:

"...working' away at the granite, surrounded by spoil heaps standing like Mesolithic cairns and prehistoric graves. Memorials in stone, in the words of John Ruskin, "to the genius of the unassisted workman". Ah, surely the ghosts of the Byrnes and the McEvoys and the ghosts of all the great stonecutters - the Edward Smiths, the John O'Shea's, the Seamus Murphy's... pass by this way at night time".

The episode of Hands also briefly visited the graveyard at Baltyboys, being "the final resting place of the remains of all the stonecutters". Mac Thomáis explained how some of the headstones had been pre-emptively carved by the same stonecutters many years before they had died. Most of the 26 minute episode focused on restoration works then underway at the old Parliament House at College Green, where a Ballyknockan stoneworker named George Flynn was filmed grouting the base of an ionic column.

In 1993, Wyse Jackson noted the use of a type of "pseudo-granite" on a building on High Street, consisting of concrete containing flecks of mica, indicating how cheaper granite alternatives were becoming available in the city.

According to Wyse Jackson, as of 1993 granite was still being quarried at Ballyknockan and also at Ballybrew, near Enniskerry. At that stage the granite was being extracted in large blocks by way of the modern methods of "low-yield explosives or diamond-studded wire, and then sawn and finished before being fitted to buildings by metal ties". Wyse Jackson admitted however that the previous 30 years (1963-1993) had been "bleak for the Irish quarries" as a whole.

In 1994, the 'Directory of Active Quarries, Pits and Mines in Ireland' published by the GSI included Ballyknockan Quarry (singular) as quarry number 191 on its list. The operator of the quarry at that time was listed as 'Stone Developments Ltd.' with an address at Ballybrew Quarries, Enniskerry, Co. Wicklow, and enquiries directed to be sent to a Mr Larry Sharp at same. The granite and quarry capabilities at Ballyknockan were assessed thus:

- Rock type: Granite.
- Geological description: Biotite granite, part of the Wicklow granite complex.
- Products: Granite for architectural, monumental and building use. Ashlar, paving and cladding.
- Specifications: Block size - one to three cubic metre. Colour - grey, white or brown. Compressive strength - 163/106 MPa. Modulus of rupture - 8.78/6.48 MPa.
- Scale of operation: 2,400tpa (tonnes per annum)

With the arrival of the Celtic Tiger period in the mid-1990s, and the economic benefits, McEvoys of Ballyknockan were noted to have "found themselves in a good position to cater for the demand from boom time kitchen designers". Granite worktops came into fashion during the period, so by 2015 it was opined by the Wicklow People that "many a kitchen now has a slab of Ballyknockan stone as its centrepiece".

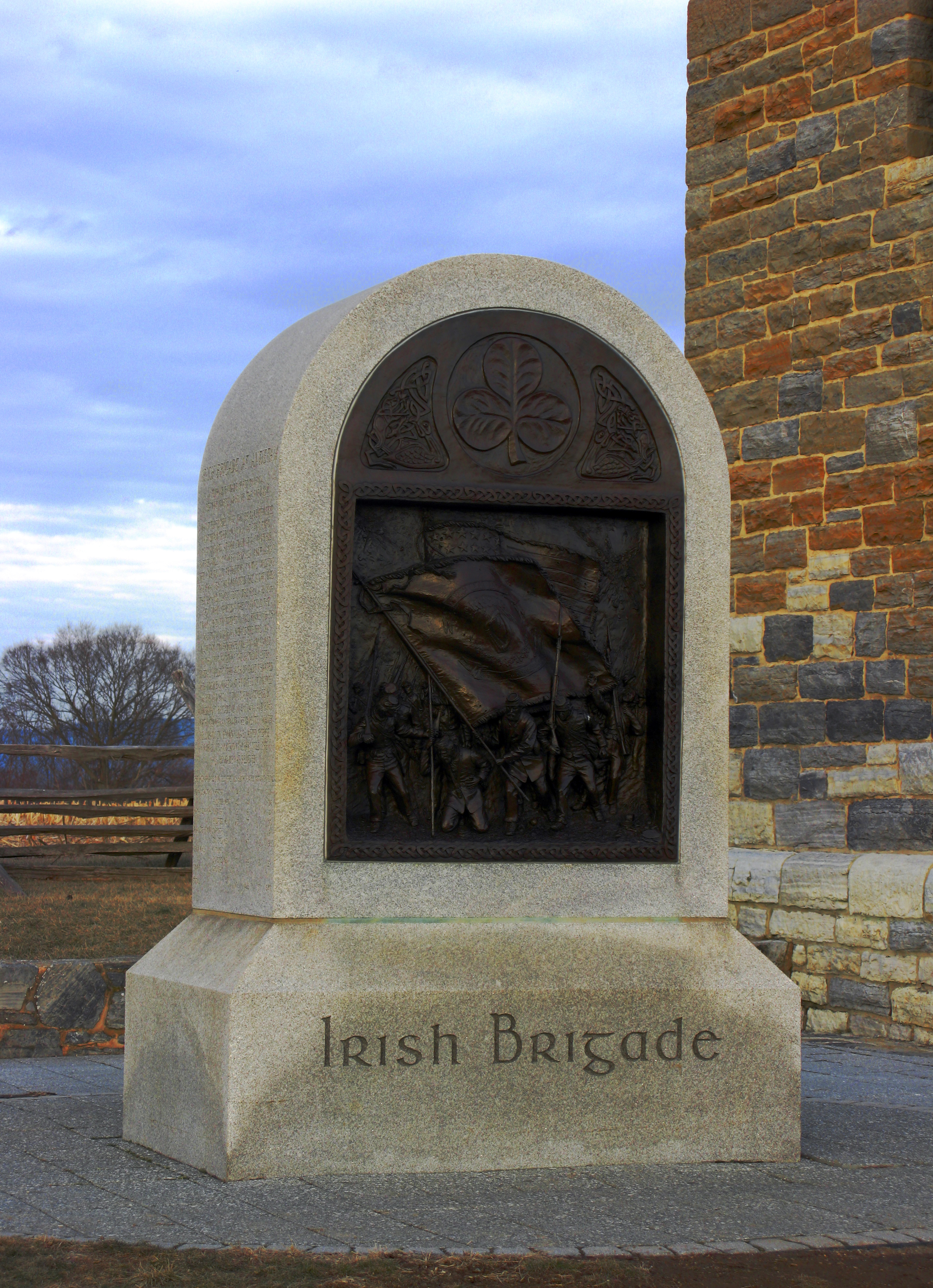
Ballyknockan granite used in a memorial dedicated to the Irish Brigade at Antietam National Battlefield, United States

In 1997, a 20-tonne tablet of Ballyknockan granite was shipped to Maryland, United States, where it stands at the Antietam National Battlefield as a memorial to the Irish Brigade (who served as part of the Union Army during the American Civil War from 1861 to 1865). The Washington Post noted that it was "the last monument the government... (would) permit at the hallowed Civil War site", and that the texture of the stone resembled "coarse bread".

== 21st century ==
From 2000, Heritage Plans for County Wicklow included actions to support a "Ballyknockan Granite Park" at the quarries, but as of 2014 it was reported that the local committee responsible for such a venture was 'seemingly defunct'.

In July 2007, a 150-year-old limestone staircase collapsed at the National Museum of Ireland – Natural History on Merrion Street, Dublin, injuring ten people. McEvoys of Ballyknockan were contracted to supply a set of stone steps to the repair project.

From 2012 until at least 2015, restoration works at Victorian era Humewood Castle in Kiltegan (which had been recently bought by American billionaire John C. Malone) provided "much specialist work" for stonecutters in Ballyknockan. The restoration project resulted in commissions for "standard items such as gatepiers" but also for unusual pieces such as "a Chinese style granite dragon head, arranged to be fitted with pipe work so that steam will come out through its nose".

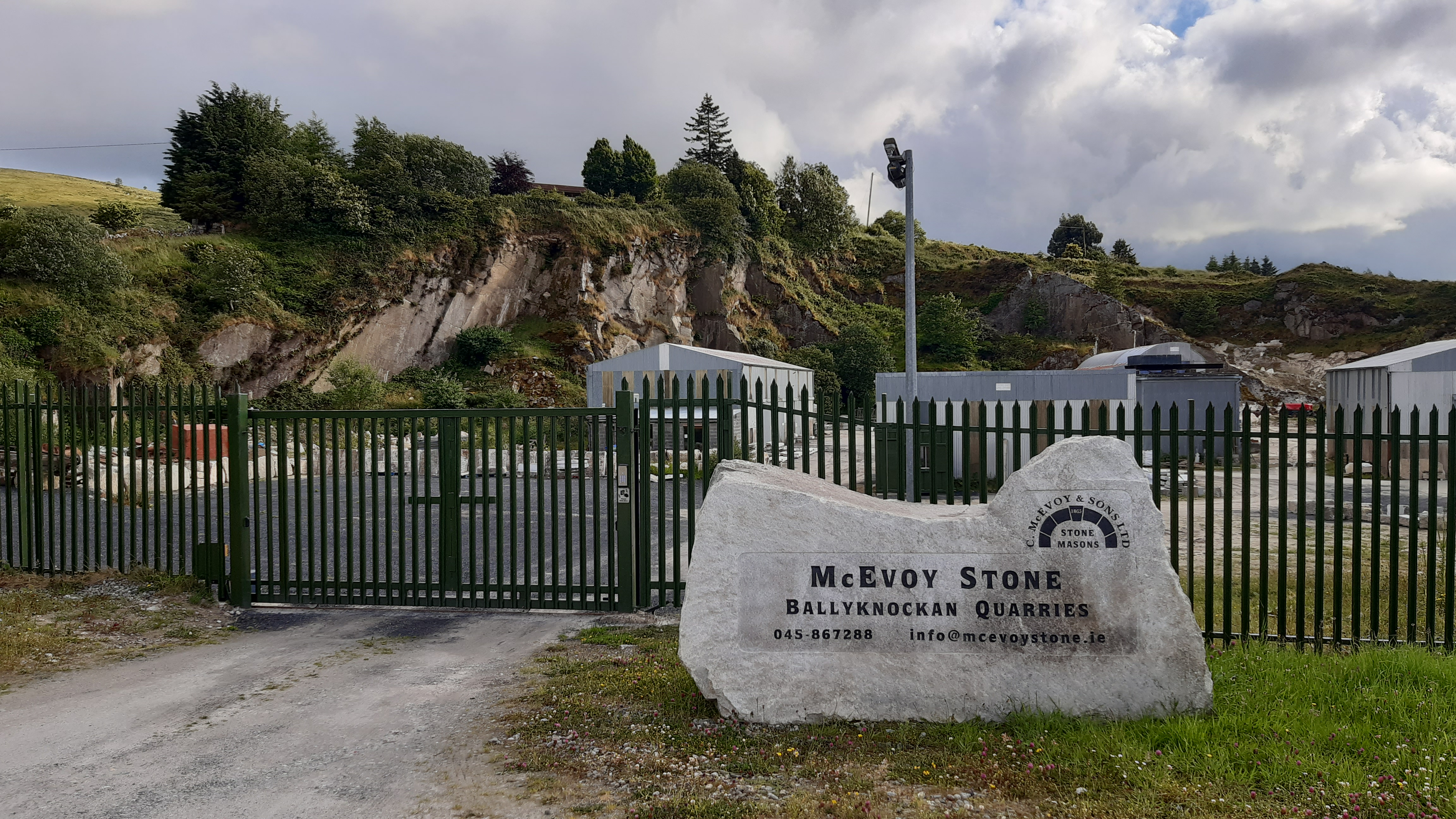
McEvoy Stone notice at the entrance to the main quarry in July 2024

As of August 2015, journalist David Medcalf reported that "the main Olligan quarry now trades as Creedon's and it continues to produce great granite for the requirements of the new millennium". Medcalf pointed out that the actual quarrying practice was no longer carried out onsite by that year ("Extracting the stone is no longer the name of the game for David and his three siblings"), but that the McEvoys continued to specialise in working local Wicklow rock which they brought in from neighbouring suppliers. Medcalf observed an old Drogheda-made crane, looking like "an ancient cannon, lying in the grass beside the lane up to the quarry".

In 2016, the quarry was included as a point of interest along a new 'Blessington Lakeside Heritage Trail' developed by Wicklow County Council and Ireland's Ancient East.

In a video posted by Galway County Heritage Office in September 2020, Killian O'Flaherty, an eighth generation stonemason from Ballyknockan, and owner of the company O'Flaherty Stone, detailed some of the projects then underway at his workshop including an ornate window surround, quoins, an ornamental 'acorn', and other projects incorporating architectural stone.

In October 2021, Ballyknockan quarryman and stone cutter John McEvoy was interviewed as part of Féile na gCloch (Festival of Stones). McEvoy demonstrated his recent work repairing a section of chimney capping from a building in the Iveagh Gardens in Dublin which had been damaged due to frost action. McEvoy explained the use of modern diamond blade machinery, as well as the hand skills of punching, pitching and carving which were still required when working in places which modern machinery couldn't reach. McEvoy demonstrated his work on a celtic cross gravestone, which he was hand-carving using a tungsten-tipped pitcher, tungsten-tipped hand punch, inch tool, lump hammer and mallet.

As of January 2024, C. McEvoy & Sons Ltd were noted as being "the last stonecutting quarry" in Ballyknockan.

== Heritage ==
Valleymount Hall hosted an exhibition from 23–24 June 2018 on the history of the stonecutting in the area, including photographs, newspaper clippings, as well as the implements and tools of the quarry men.

Talks, exhibitions and open days have been held onsite since at least the year 2000 as part of the Heritage Week initiative, organised by the Heritage Council. Members of the McEvoy family have also spoken about the stone cutting craft at local history events in the past.

On 20 August 2023, as part of Heritage Week, O'Flaherty Stone hosted a guided tour around Ballyknockan, and a stone-cutting demonstration to celebrate the bicentennial of the town entitled "200 Years of Ballyknockan. A Living History". In October that year, the event was selected as the overall 'County Winner' for County Wicklow at the 2023 National Heritage Week Awards.

=== Ballyknockan Quarries Heritage Museum ===
From 2–6 May 2024, the inaugural iteration of a new music and heritage festival named Féile an Chnocaín took place in Ballyknockan village, aimed at "celebrat(ing) the history of the quarry". As part of the festival, a new museum entitled the 'Ballyknockan Quarries Heritage Museum' was opened. The opening ceremony, held on 4 May, featured an "introduction to the quarries, displays of stonework, a history talk, poetry by Ger Devine, and live music".

C. McEvoy & Sons subsequently hosted a stone cutting and heritage exhibition at the museum on 24 August 2024 as part of Heritage Week. The exhibition aimed "to showcase how things worked (at the quarry), along with the works (the quarry) has produced & is still producing today".

== Health effects on workers ==
Writing in The Wicklow People in 2015, journalist David Medcalf noted the set of ear defenders around a modern quarryman's neck, a "symbol of a concern for health and safety which was never much of a worry for previous generations". The quarry workers of old did not use protective equipment and were more likely to suffer from hearing and breathing difficulties as a result, which reduced their life expectancy.

== Flora ==
In 1906, J. Adams, writing in The Irish Naturalist, noted how the previous July he had obtained several fronds of "parsley fern growing in crevices between stones at Ballyknockan, near the granite quarries". Until recent to his find, the plant had not been known to grow anywhere in Ireland south of a line from Sligo to Dundalk.

In 1928, the naturalist James Ponsonby Brunker described the presence of the "elusive" hammarbya paludosa, or bog orchid, in "a wet bog at the foot of Moanbane, east of Ballyknockan quarries".

The Ballyknockan granite quarries were one of a number of locations visited by the Dublin Naturalist's Field Club on 12 July 1935, as well as nearby Lockstown Bridge (which crosses the King's River) and Killough bog (subsequently submerged between 1937-47 by the flooding of the valley for Poulaphouca Reservoir). It is not known what the club intended to observe at the quarries, but it is stated that "some of the characteristic bog plants were seen" at Killough bog.

Meconopsis cambrica was first recorded in the quarries in 1940. Filago minima (of the Filago genus) has also been recorded there since 1950.

== Other notable uses of Ballyknockan granite ==
In his book "The Building Stones of Dublin: A Walking Guide", published in 1993, Wyse Jackson noted the use of Ballyknockan granite in a number of city centre buildings:

- The "recently renovated" rear of Bedford Hall in Dublin Castle (the side facing Castle Street), situated between the entrance gates of Fortitude and Justice (consisting of "alternating layers or courses of Ballyknockan granite and Lecarrow limestone")
- Dublin City Council's Civic Offices on Wood Quay (faced with "large but thin slabs" of Ballyknockan granite)
- The Central Bank (faced with Ballyknockan granite)
- The upper storeys of the Old Library building at Trinity College Dublin (built with "grey Ballyknockan granite on the upper storeys")
- The Museum Building at Trinity College Dublin (The exterior walls of the building are "faced with 9 inches of Ballyknockan granite", which was also used to build the "back stairways leading to the basement")
- Norwich Union House on Dawson Street ("...the entrance has been faced with flame-textured pink Porrino granite... and with Leinster granite from Ballyknockan")
- St. Ann's Church, Dawson Street ("faced with Ballyknockan granite")
- Fusiliers' Arch, St Stephen's Green ("It is built of Ballyknockan granite", except the pale limestone inscription panel insets which are from Sheephouse, near Drogheda)
- Royal College of Science for Ireland, Merrion Street Upper ("...the basement level is faced with Ballyknockan granite, in which schlieren or accumulations of mica can easily be seen")
- ICS Building (Irish Civil Service Building Society), Westmoreland Street ("faced with a number of granites including Ballyknockan...")
- Butt Bridge ("made of Ballyknockan granite")

== Gallery ==
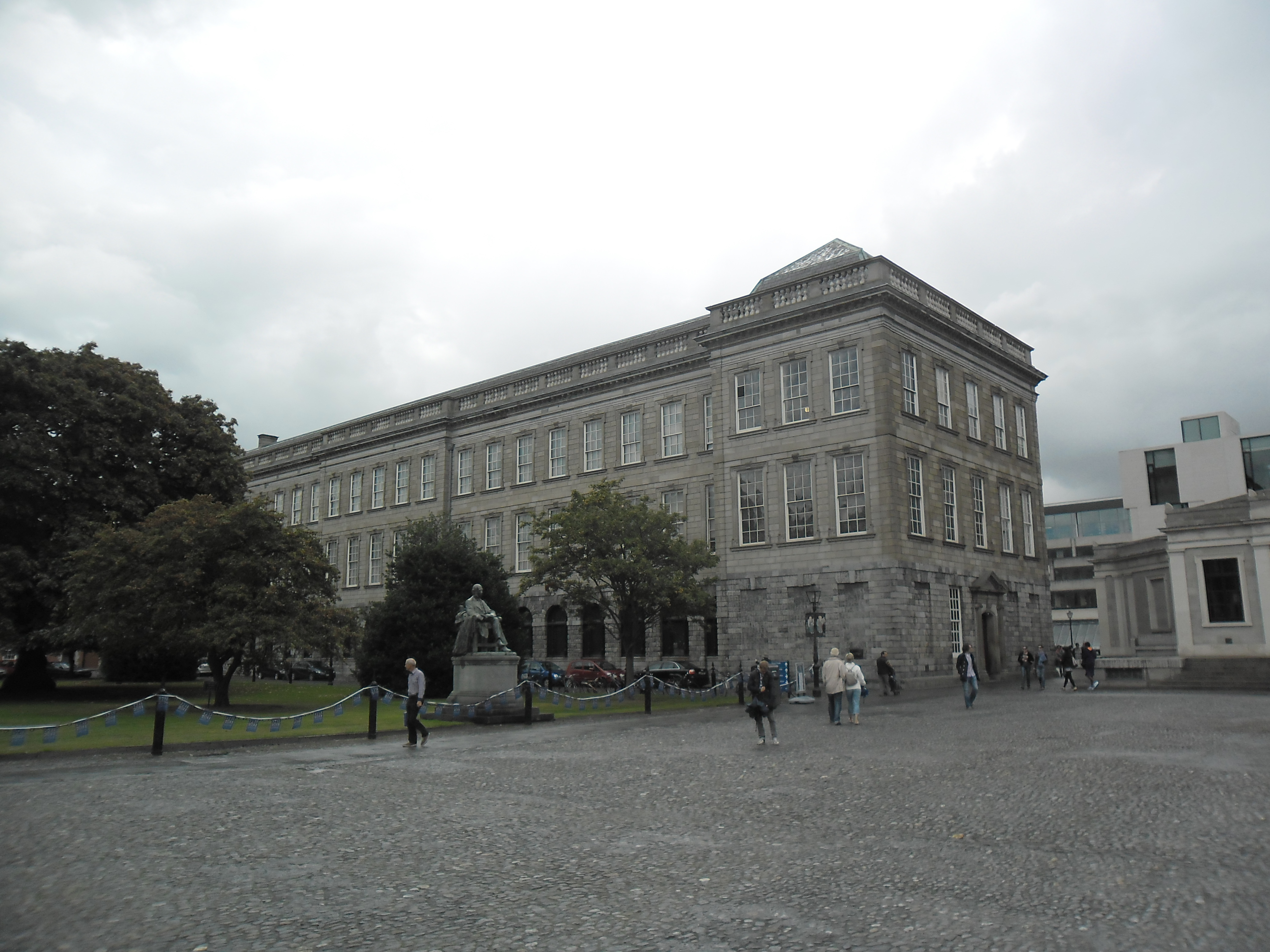
The Old Library at Trinity College Dublin (built with "grey Ballyknockan granite on the upper storeys")

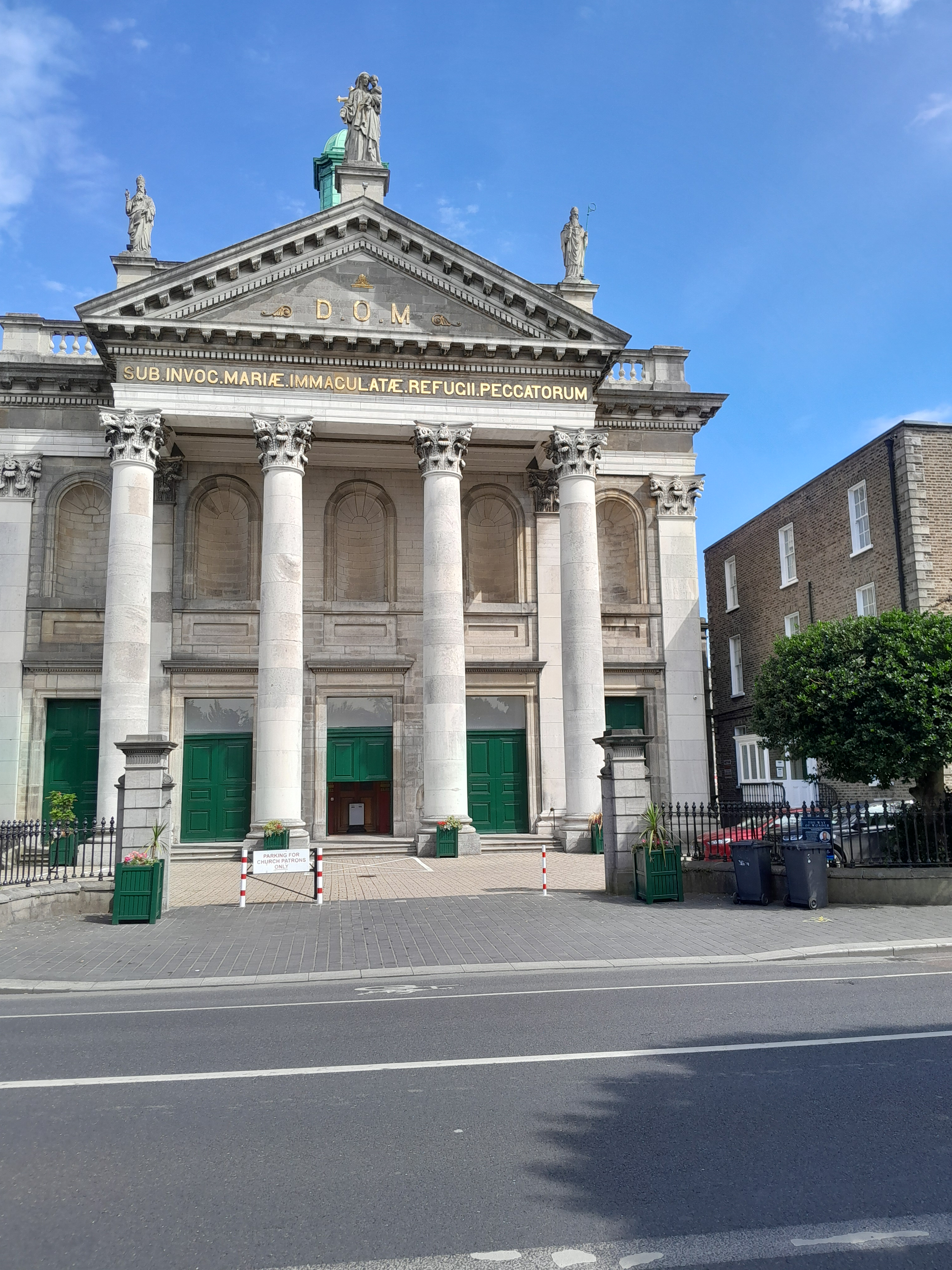
Mary Immaculate, Refuge of Sinners Church in Rathmines (built 1850-1856)

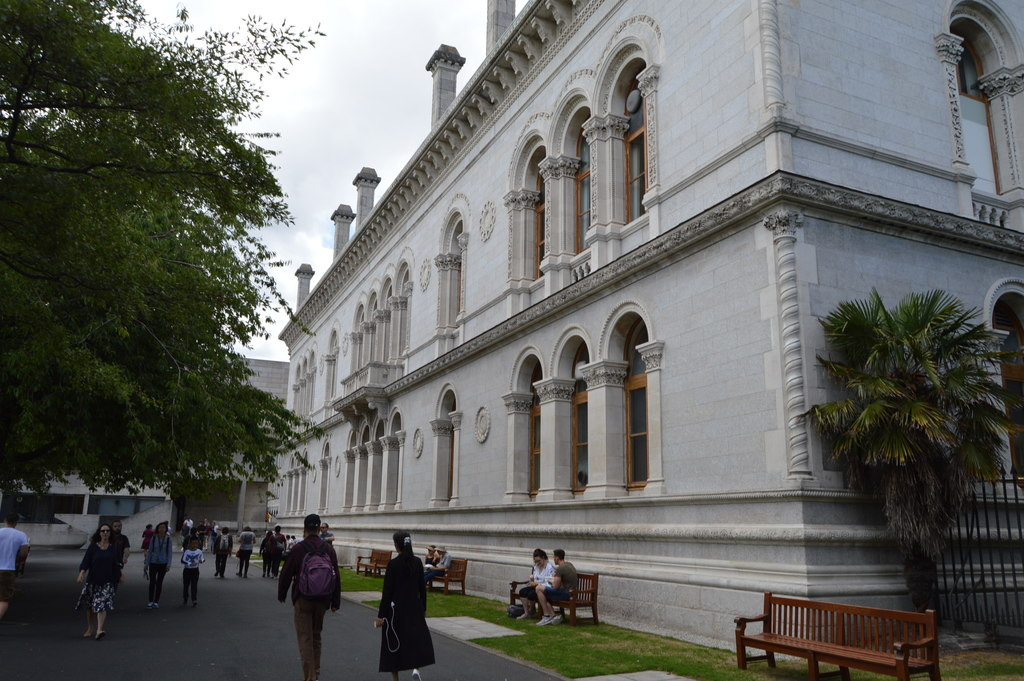
The Museum Building at Trinity College (built 1853-1857)

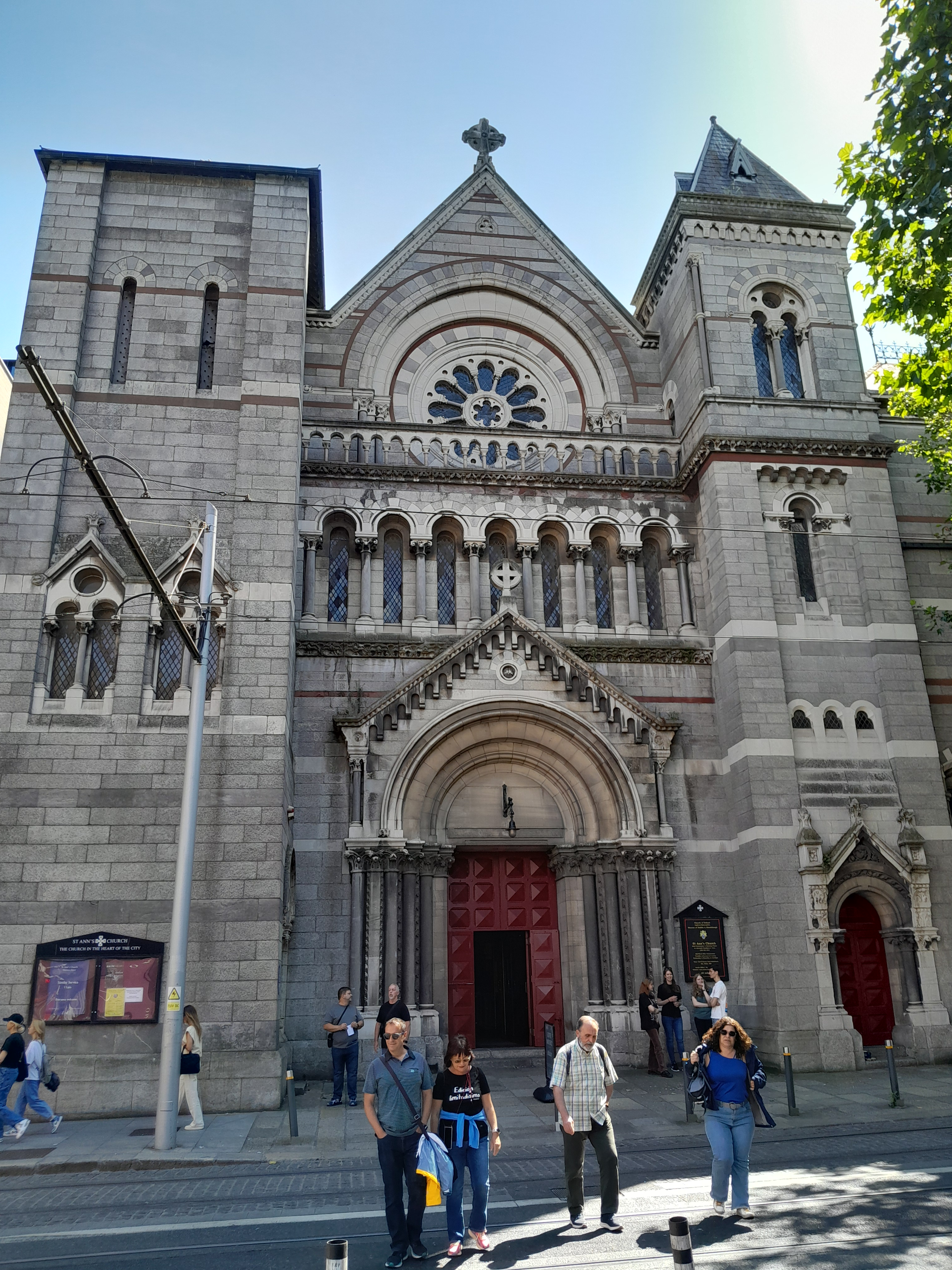
St. Ann's Church on Dawson Street (current façade dating to 1868)

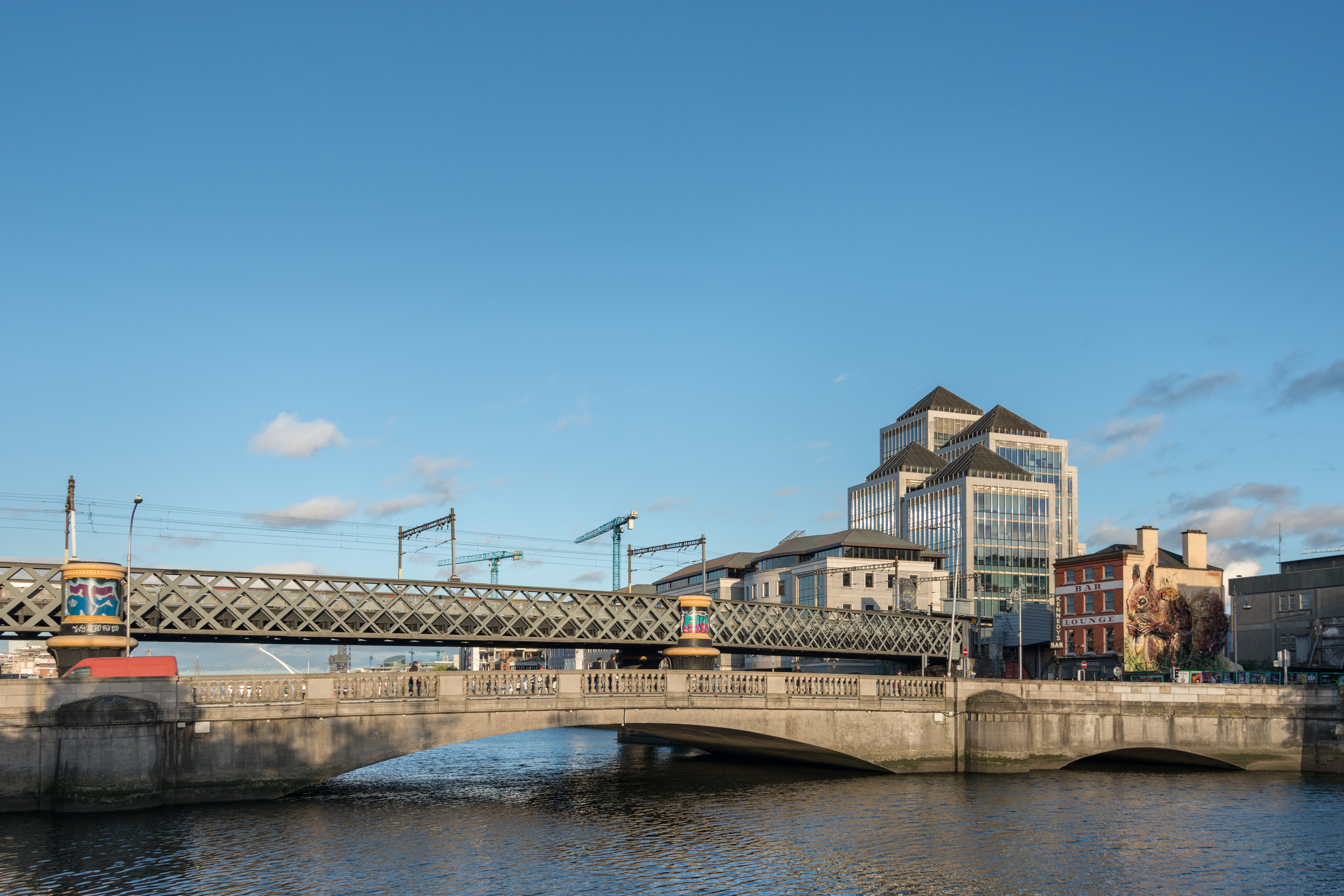
Butt Bridge (opened 1879)

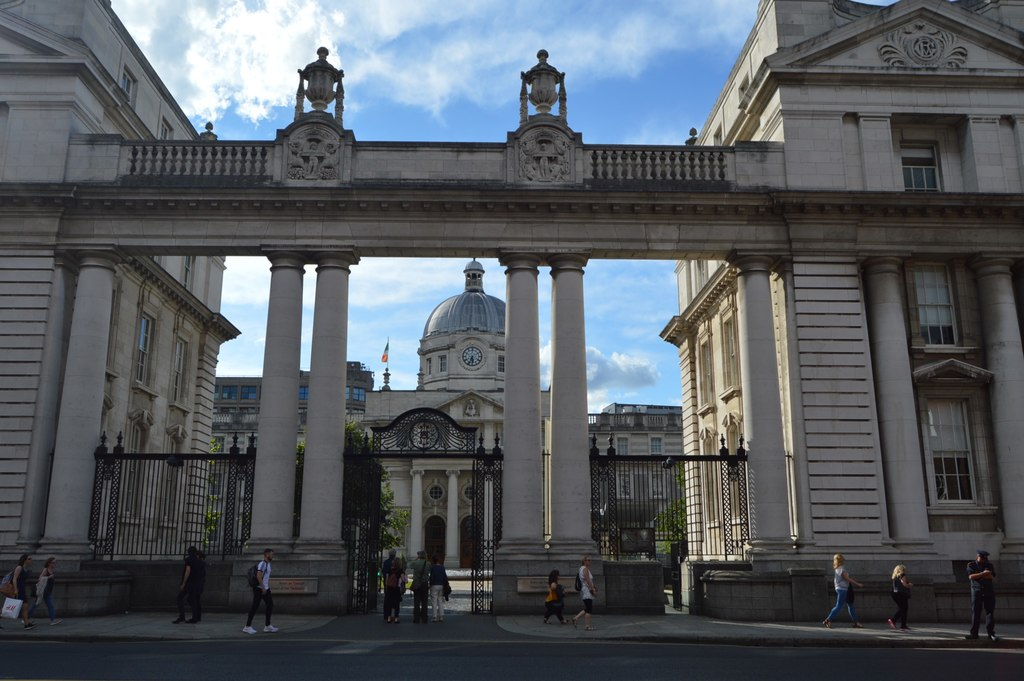
Royal College of Science for Ireland on Merrion Street Upper (built 1904-1911) ("...the basement level is faced with Ballyknockan granite")

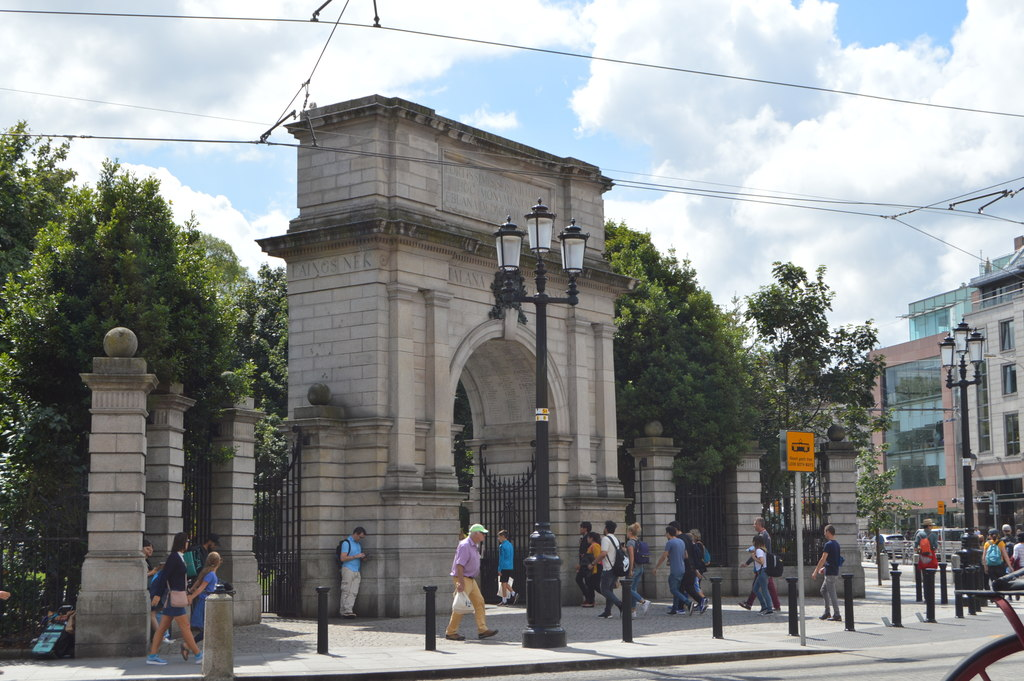
Fusiliers' Arch in St Stephen's Green (opened 1907)

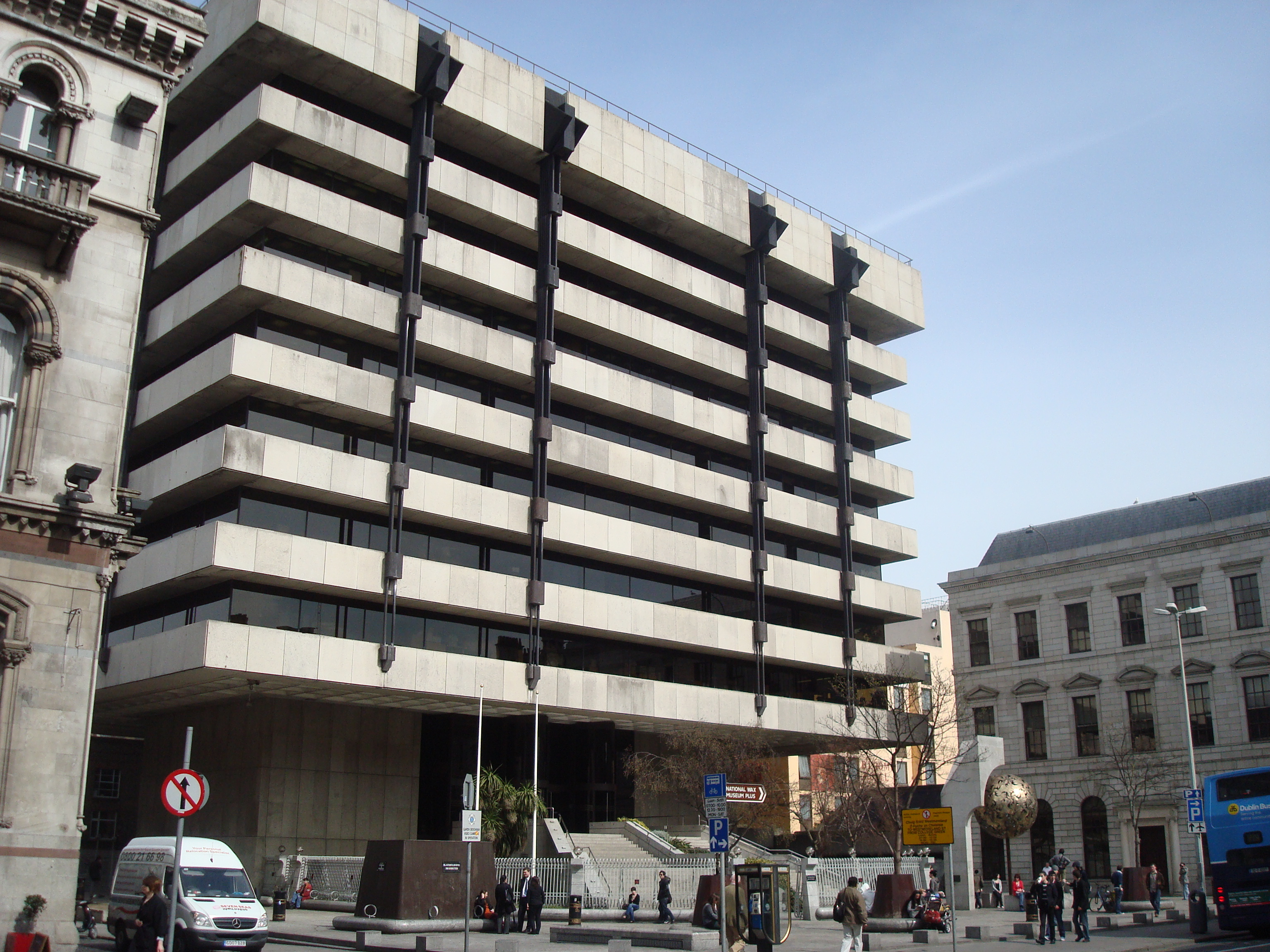
The Central Bank of Ireland Building (built 1973-1978)

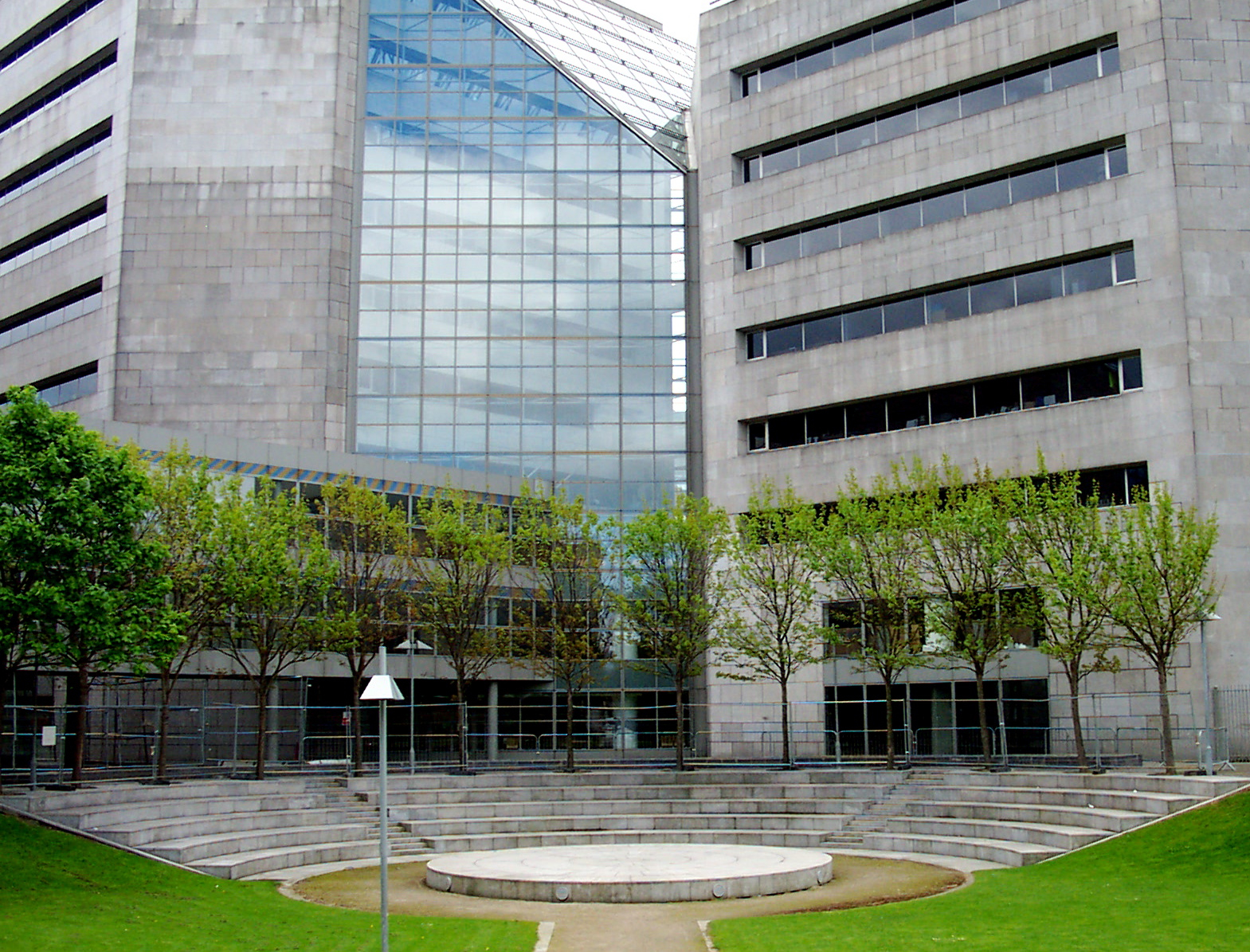
Dublin City Council's Civic Offices on Wood Quay (built 1981-1986)

== See also ==
- Georgian Dublin, a historic period in Dublin's development which ended in 1830
