= Fusiliers' Arch =

Monument at the entrance to St Stephen's Green park, in Dublin, Ireland

- Áirse na bhFiúsailéirí
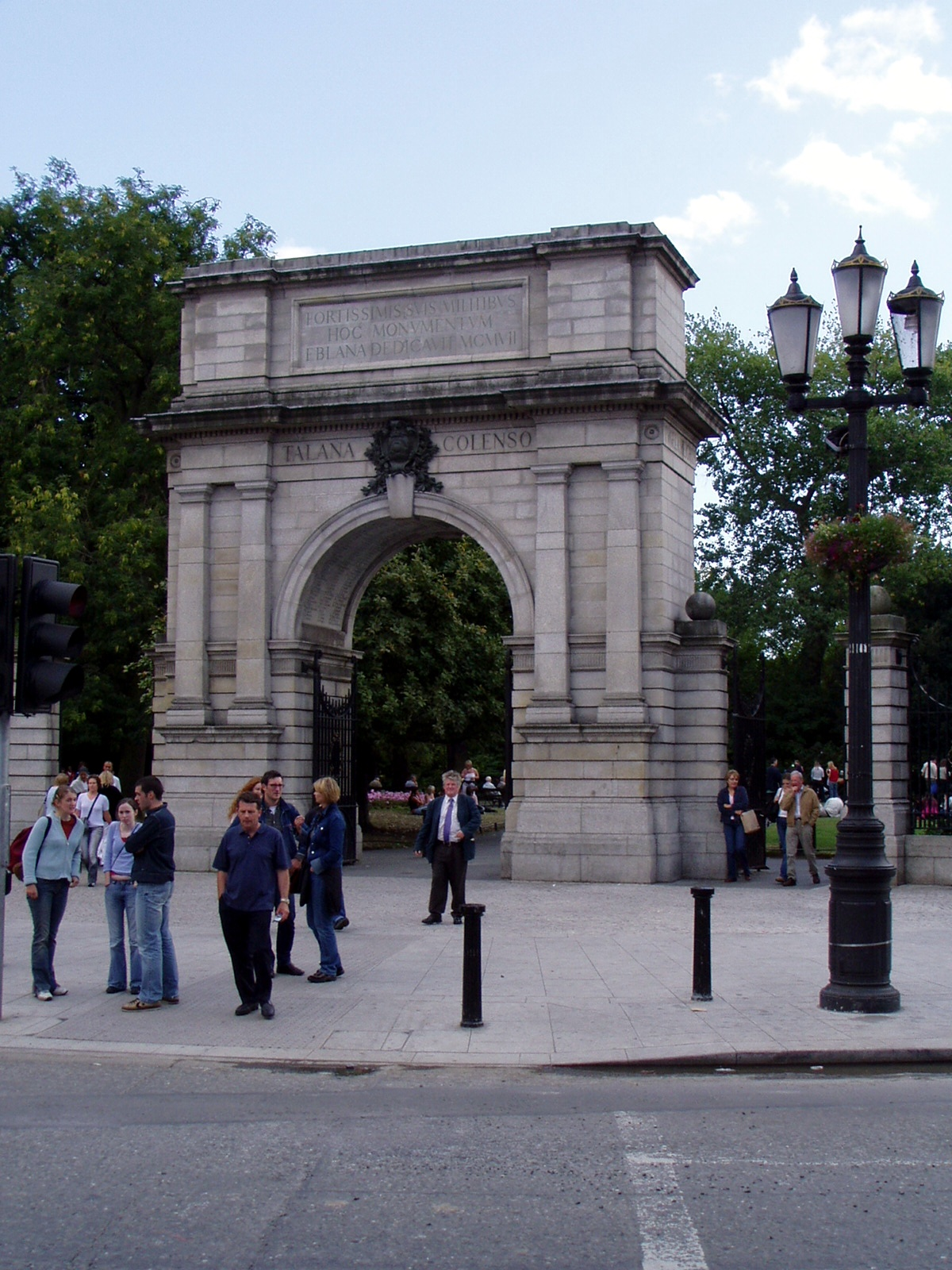
- Interactive map of Fusiliers' Arch
- Location: Northwest corner of St Stephen's Green, Dublin
- Coordinates: 53.33965°N 6.26052°W
- Designer: John Howard Pentland, Thomas Drew
- Type: Memorial arch
- Material: Granite, limestone, bronze
- Height: 9.9 metres (32 ft)
- Completion date: 1907
- Dedicated to: Royal Dublin Fusiliers who died in the Second Boer War

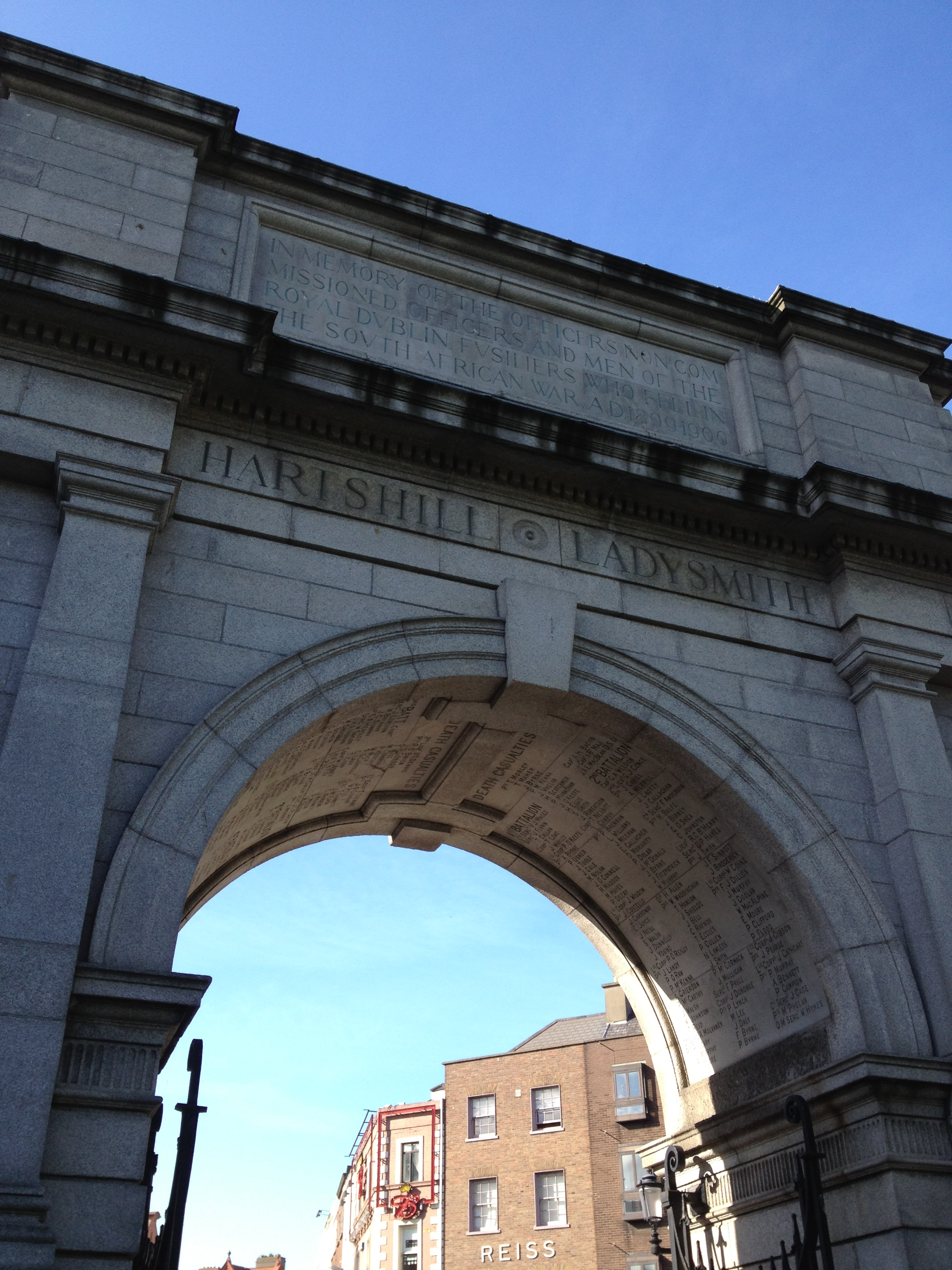
Name inscription on underside of arch

The Fusiliers' Arch is a monument which forms part of the Grafton Street entrance to St Stephen's Green park, in Dublin, Ireland. Erected in 1907, it was dedicated to the officers, non-commissioned officers and enlisted men of the Royal Dublin Fusiliers who fought and died in the Second Boer War (1899–1902).

== Construction ==
Funded by public subscription, the arch was designed by John Howard Pentland and built by Henry Laverty and Sons. Thomas Drew consulted on the design and construction.

The proportions of the structure are said to be modelled on the Arch of Titus in Rome. It is approximately 8.5 m (28 ft) wide and 10 m (33 ft) high. (Note: A plaque alongside the arch reads: "The Arch was constructed of Irish granite with the inscriptions carried out in limestone by Laverty & Sons from Belfast. The Arch stands 32 feet 6 inches in height and 27 feet and 3 inches in width") The internal dimensions of the arch are 5.6 m high and approximately 3.7 m wide (18 by 12 ft).

The main structure of the arch is granite from Ballyknockan quarry in County Wicklow, excepting the pale limestone inscription panel insets which are from Sheephouse, near Drogheda. The inscriptions are carried out in limestone, with a bronze adornment on the front of the arch.

== Dedication and reception ==
The arch was commissioned to commemorate the four battalions (two regular and two militia) of the Royal Dublin Fusiliers that served in the Second Boer war. The names of 222 dead are inscribed on the underside of the arch.

The construction of the arch coincided with a time of political and social change in Ireland, and the colonial and imperial background to the dedication were anathema to a burgeoning nationalist movement – who labelled the structure "Traitor's Gate". Though damaged in a cross-fire between the Irish Citizen Army and British forces during the 1916 Easter Rising, the arch remains "one of the few colonialist monuments in Dublin not blown up" in Ireland's post-independence history.

== Text ==
Engraved on the western face is the Latin text, Fortissimis suis militibus hoc monumentum Eblana dedicavit MCMVII, "To its strongest soldiers, Dublin dedicates this monument, 1907." (Eblana is a name that appears on Ptolemy's 2nd century AD map of Ireland, traditionally taken as a Latin name for Dublin, although it more likely refers to a site further north, around Loughshinny.) Six battlefields are inscribed on the arch:

- Talana: Battle of Talana Hill, 20 October 1899
- Ladysmith: Battle of Ladysmith, 30 October 1899
- Colenso: Battle of Colenso, 15 December 1899
- Tugela Heights: Battle of the Tugela Heights, 14–27 February 1900
- Hartshill: Hart's Hill, 23 February 1900, part of the Relief of Ladysmith
- Laings Nek: Laing's Nek was the scene of intense fighting, 2–9 June 1900. Not to be confused with the more famous Battle of Laing's Nek (1881)
