= Hugh Darley =

Irish Stonecutter and Architect (1701–1771)

- Born: 1701; Newtownards, County Down
- Died: 1771 (aged 69–70); Dublin
- Occupation: Architect
- Parent: Henry Darley (father)
- Relatives: Moses Darley (brother) (d 1754); Arthur Darley (brother) (1692-1742)

Hugh Darley (1701–1771) was an 18th-century Irish architect and stonecutter who is most notable for his work as builder, stonecutter, supplier and architect on various buildings and projects in the Trinity College Dublin campus.

== History ==
The third son of Henry Darley, a stonecutter and quarry owner of Newtownards, County Down, he had moved to Dublin by 1725 where he is recorded as working on buildings at Bachelor's Walk. He is also recorded as working at various times in counties Westmeath, Antrim, Down and Louth.

He was living at 10 Lower Abbey Street, 1761–1763 and later at Marlborough Street, 1764–1771.

His immediate family included elder brothers Moses Darley (died 1754) and Arthur Darley (1692–1742) who were also both involved in the building trade while his great-grandnephew was the architect Frederick Darley and another grandnephew was the poet George Darley. His son John (born 1731) became collector of customs at Newry.

Over the course of two centuries, the extended Darley family were particularly heavily involved in the provision of stone and building services to Trinity College Dublin. In the 1750s, Darley is recorded as employing over 100 men on college related building works alone.

He appears to have owned the quarries at Ardbraccan (limestone) for a period as well as at Golden Hill (granite) near the village of Kilbride, County Wicklow.

For a period, Edward Smyth was apprenticed to Darley who recommended him to work with James Gandon.

== Notable building projects ==
- Trinity College Dublin, west front (1752-59) as builder and superintendent
- St. Peter's Church of Ireland, Drogheda (1748) as architect
- Old Four Courts, St Micahel's Hill (1749) as stonecutter
- Provost's House, Trinity College Dublin (1759) as builder
- Trinity College Dublin - rebuilding of Dining Hall (1760) after its collapse
- Mayoralty House, Drogheda (1769) - as architect and superintendent
