= Golden Hill quarry =

Former granite quarry in County Wicklow, Ireland

- Location within Ireland
- Location: Manor Kilbride, Blessington, County Wicklow, , Ireland; 53.1980°N 6.4788°W
- Products: Granite
- Opened: 1740 approximately
- Closed: 1820-50 (exhausted)

Golden Hill quarry, is a former granite quarry on Golden Hill, adjacent to the village of Manor Kilbride, County Wicklow, Ireland. Its exact coordinates are unknown.

Dr. Patrick Wyse Jackson, curator of the Geological Museum at Trinity College Dublin, hypothesised that the Golden Hill granite was so named due to it having been partially weathered in situ, with the result that the "slightly altered feldspars" gave the rock "a brownish hue".

When the quarry was exhausted sometime between 1820 and 1850, the associated workers moved to Ballyknockan a short distance away where a complex of granite quarries were founded.

== History ==
=== Background ===
The granite in the Wicklow Mountains, wherein Golden Hill sits, is of Devonian age dating to around 400 million years ago and is part of what is known as the 'Leinster granite batholith' which stretches from Killiney Hill in Dublin southwards to County Carlow. Granite has also been exploited on the island of Ireland in counties Galway, Donegal and Down. The wider Dublin area was exploited for its granite for centuries, and it is known that granite quarrying took place at Dalkey quarry, close to Dublin city, from 1680. Granite was commonly known as "firestone" until the late eighteenth century; not from its classification as an igneous rock (which at this stage was still unknown), but rather from its initial usage as a material from which to make fire grates and chimney pieces owing to its heat-resistant properties.

Prior to 1720, calp limestone was the main stone building material used in Dublin, and was quarried locally in the suburbs of Palmerstown, Kimmage, Rathgar and Donnybrook (where a Dublin Bus depot exists today). After this date, imported limestones, sandstones and granites began to replace the calp as they became more popular. The nearest granite sources to Dublin were the quarries of south County Dublin and north-west County Wicklow.

The eighteenth century, "probably Dublin's most prosperous period" according to Wyse Jackson, saw the erection of many of Dublin's most important public buildings which were built of calp limestone rubble walls and "faced with either Leinster granite or Portland stone" imported from England. During this period the quarry was owned by the prominent Darley building family.

Granite from the Wicklow and Dublin Mountains, and limestone from the immediate hinterland, came to be the primary stones used in the construction of Dublin city, and became recognised as being "characteristic to Dublin" in the same way that basalt from County Antrim and granite from the Mourne Mountains came to typify Belfast's urban landscape.

=== West Wicklow quarries of the 1700s ===
Blessington is the largest town in the vicinity of Golden Hill, lying approximately 5 km away (as the crow flies), and became the administrative centre for much of the surrounding countryside after the formation of the Blessington Estate in 1667. According to Wyse Jackson and Caulfield:

"Granite was reportedly first quarried in west Wicklow in the early 1700s from several openings at Baltyboys near Blessington, and from 1740 in more significant volumes at Woodend and Threecastles nearby and then from Golden Hill. The Baltyboys stone may have been the source of the granite used in the central 'piazza' at the Parliament House, where contemporary documents show that William Borrowdale was paid £6-16s-2d for 'mountain stone' on 24 December 1729."

Starting from the year 1700, a "string" of granite quarries opened in the Blessington area, each lasting "anywhere from 40 to 150 years", according to John Hussey, an academic and engineer. Hussey noted that the granite pieces were cut, either onsite or at the building site, into what were known as "wallers" - conveniently sized pieces with which to wall the side of a building. Five wallers weighed approximately a tonne, whereas the smallest individual sections of Portland stone used had a weight of about five tonnes apiece. It was possible to transport these large sections of Portland stone from Dorset by sea right up to the quays of Dublin, whereas each piece of granite had to come from west Wicklow on horse and cart via roads that were in a bad condition. In 1981, the TV series Hands filmed stoneworkers replacing some of the wallers of the Parliament House (Bank of Ireland) which was being renovated at the time.

In 1720, Trinity College Dublin accounts show that one John Bawnan was paid £11-10s-7d for "Blessington Stones delivered for work on the new kitchen". "Blessington Stones" were once again mentioned in a Trinity receipt from 1721, and again in 1726 when a "Mr Whinery" was paid for "a Cornish of Blessington Stone for the new building adjoining the laboratory"; a Cornish presumably indicating a unit of measurement. The Trinity records are useful not only in identifying the area from which the granite was sourced at that time, but also for listing the individual names of the suppliers of the stone, and of the stonecutters. The names include William Reily, Robert Smith and Nathan Hall, whose surnames all appear in the parish registers of St Mary's church in Blessington, with some entries going back to the late 1600s (shortly after the church was built).

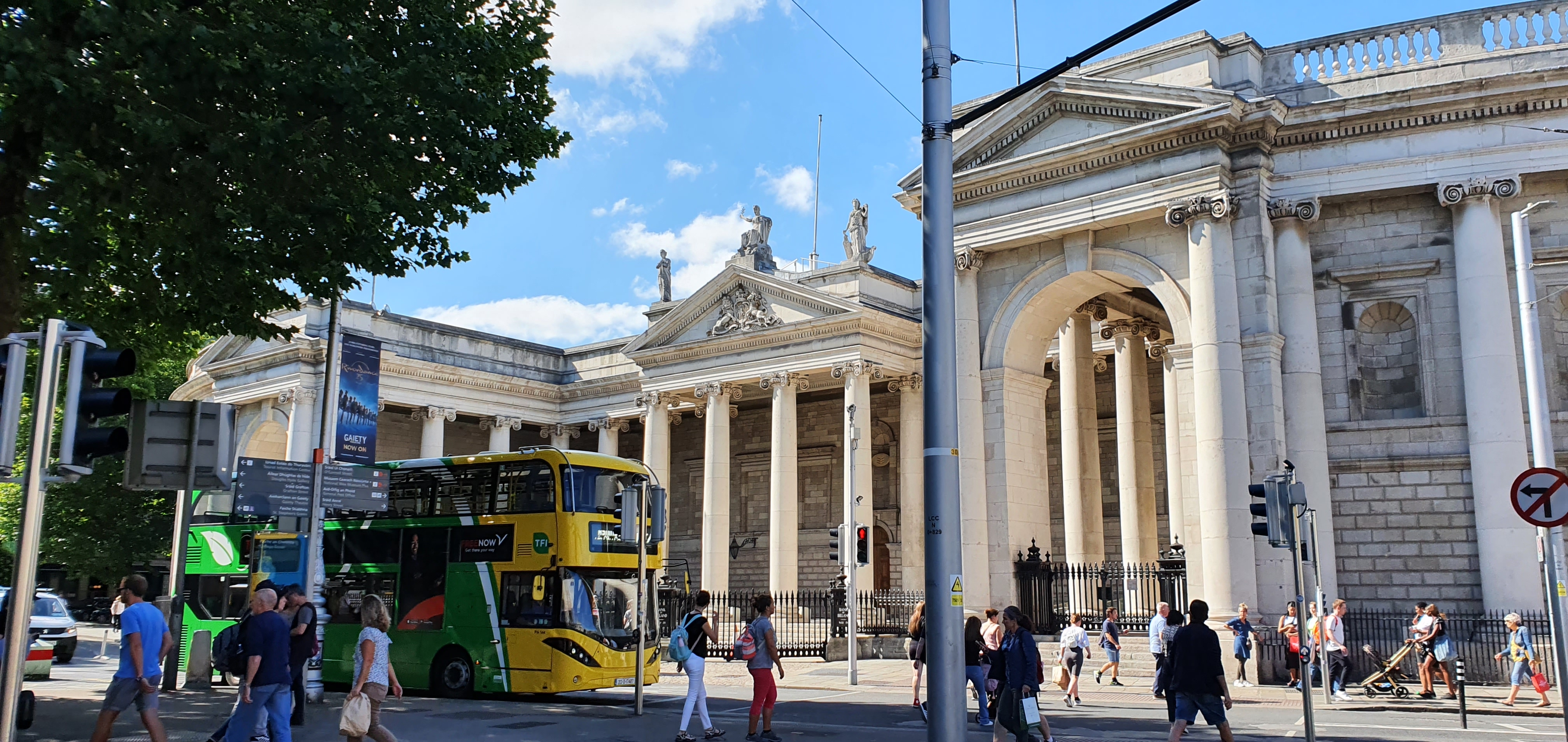
The former Irish Parliament House (now Bank of Ireland), College Green, Dublin in 2022

Parliament House, built between 1729 and 1739 is noteworthy for among other things its decorations, some of which, unusually, were carved from granite as opposed to the more malleable Portland stone used for much of the building. Wyse Jackson notes that "they would have been difficult to produce, on account of the coarse texture of the rock, and so they reflect the considerable skills of the stonemasons. It is unusual to find granite so delicately carved".

A detailed map of the Blessington area surveyed by Jacob Neville dating from 1760 shows two unnamed granite quarries in the locality of the town, identified more explicitly by Hussey as those at Woodend and Threecastles, where "faint traces" of quarries could still be seen as of 2014. It is likely that one of either of these were the source of the 'Blessington Stone' supplied to Trinity College in 1721.

Hussey notes that the quarries at Woodend and Threecastles would have supported a significant industrial settlement at Oldcourt, a crossroads village situated between the two, where perhaps "over 100 men" were employed. These workmen were typically drawn from the Catholic population, whereas the quarry-owners were usually Church of Ireland. According to Wyse Jackson and Caulfield, the ability to quarry granite in considerable volume was delayed in Ireland until the mid-1700s due to technological constraints.

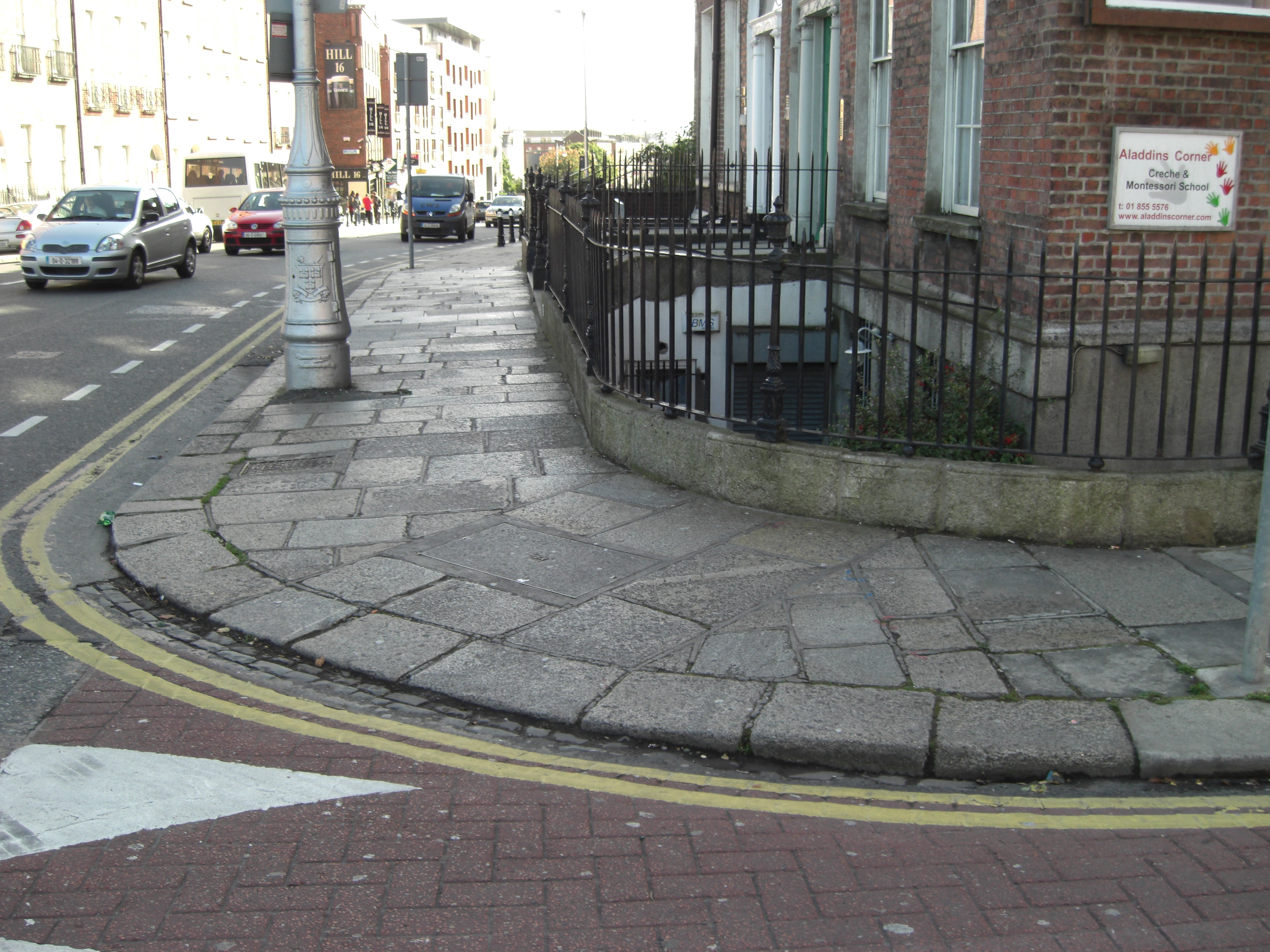
Granite paving stones on the corner of Mountjoy Square, Dublin

In the 1770s, the Commissioners for Paving the Streets of Dublin, commonly known as the Dublin Paving Board, adopted "wholesale" the use of granite for their paving in the city, replacing the use of calp limestone which had been the case since medieval times.

=== Wicklow granite types ===
According to Wyse Jackson and Caulfield:

"Within the Leinster granite batholith... a number of plutons, or individual masses of granite, formed and each has a distinctive textural characteristic. The granites that were quarried at Baltyboys, Blessington, Woodend, Threecastles and Golden Hill in west County Wicklow, as well as those from Glencree, consist of crystals that were of smaller size having been formed at the same time, whereas granite from Three Rock Mountain and Glencullen contained conspicuous crystals of mica up to half an inch (12 mm) wide..."

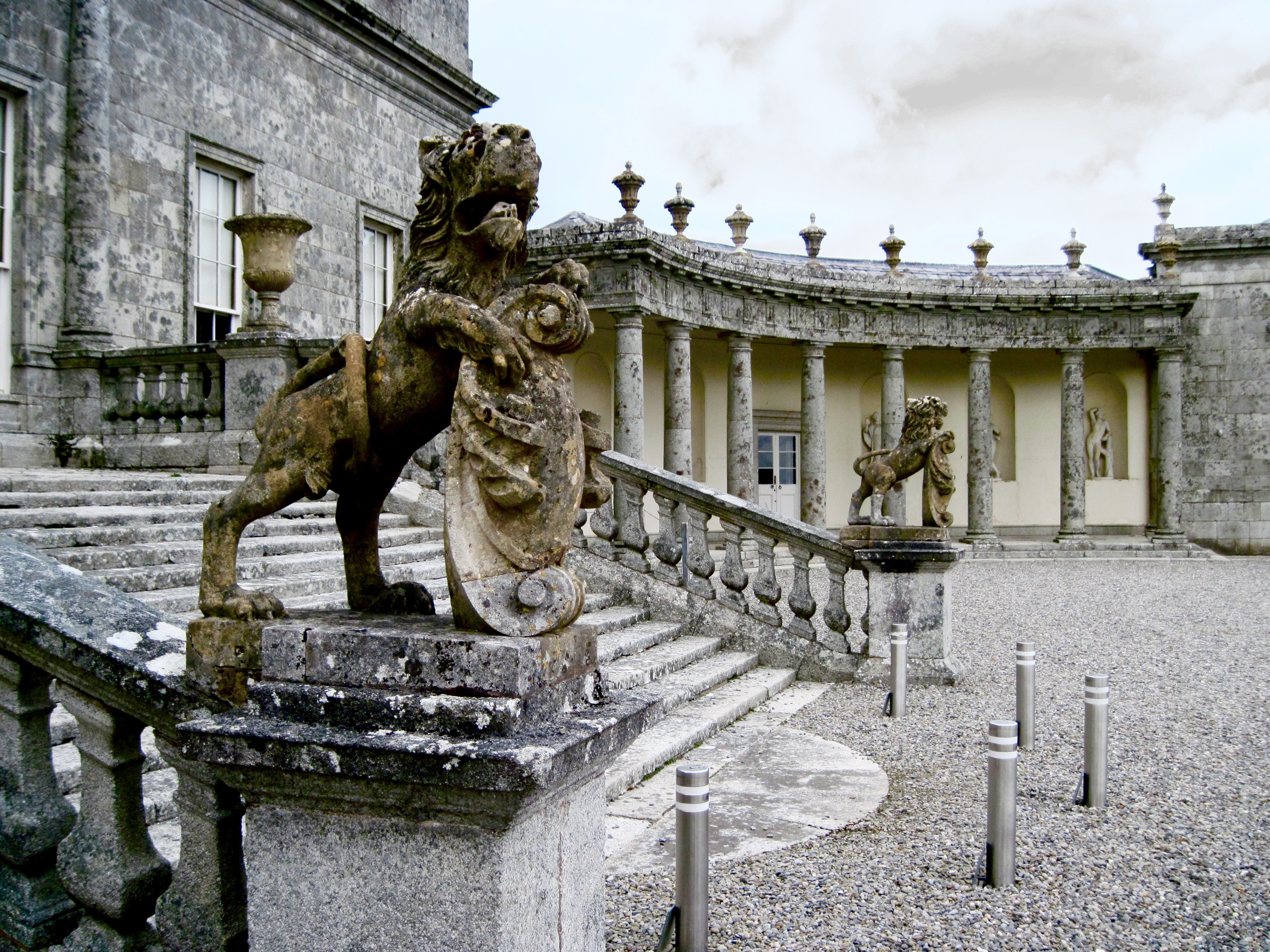
Entrance steps to Russborough House

Owing to the recognisability of the different granite types, Wyse Jackson and Caulfield contend that granite quarried from the western edge of the batholith were used in the construction of the West Front of Trinity College (built early 1700s), the Parliament House (built 1729–39), Russborough House (built 1741–55), and the GPO (built 1814–18). In 1993, Wyse Jackson simply stated that the side wings of the GPO were in "Leinster granite", but did not specify an exact source.

Conversely, the Glencree variety from the eastern side of the batholith were used by Viscount Powerscourt in the construction of his Powerscourt Estate (built 1731–41) and Powerscourt House (built 1771–74) on South William Street. According to Hayes, other granite quarries in the vicinity of Powerscourt included Toneygarrow, Lough Bray and Ballybrew. Other granite quarries in the wider Dublin hinterland included Kilgobbin, Golden Ball and Barnacullia quarries.

In 1976, the old Parliament House in Dublin began undergoing a period of restoration, having been subjected to the elements for 250 years. Speaking on RTÉ Radio 1, Jim Murphy, the contractor responsible for supplying the replacement granite, noted that he had already seen four distinct granite types represented in the fabric of the building; namely those from Dalkey, Barnacullia, Glencullen, and "an awful lot" from the Ballyknockan area. Murphy was able to distinguish between the different granites by the appearance of their surfaces, and "big scale" of mica present in some stones versus others. Stonecutters from Ballyknockan and Barnacullia were employed in the restoration works that year.

=== Usage ===
In his book "The Building Stones of Dublin: A Walking Guide", published in 1993, Wyse Jackson noted the use of Golden Hill granite in a number of city centre buildings and locations:

- The "imposing" entrance to Trinity College, consisting of "a central area flanked by two square pavilions", was built in the 1750s of Leinster Granite from Golden Hill, Co Wicklow, and Portland Stone was used for the architraves, swags, and Corinthian pilasters and half-columns...
- New Square, Trinity College ("...standing in New Square, one is surrounded by residential buildings on two sides, built of Golden Hill Granite...")
- Daly's Club on Dame Street, which was opened in 1791.

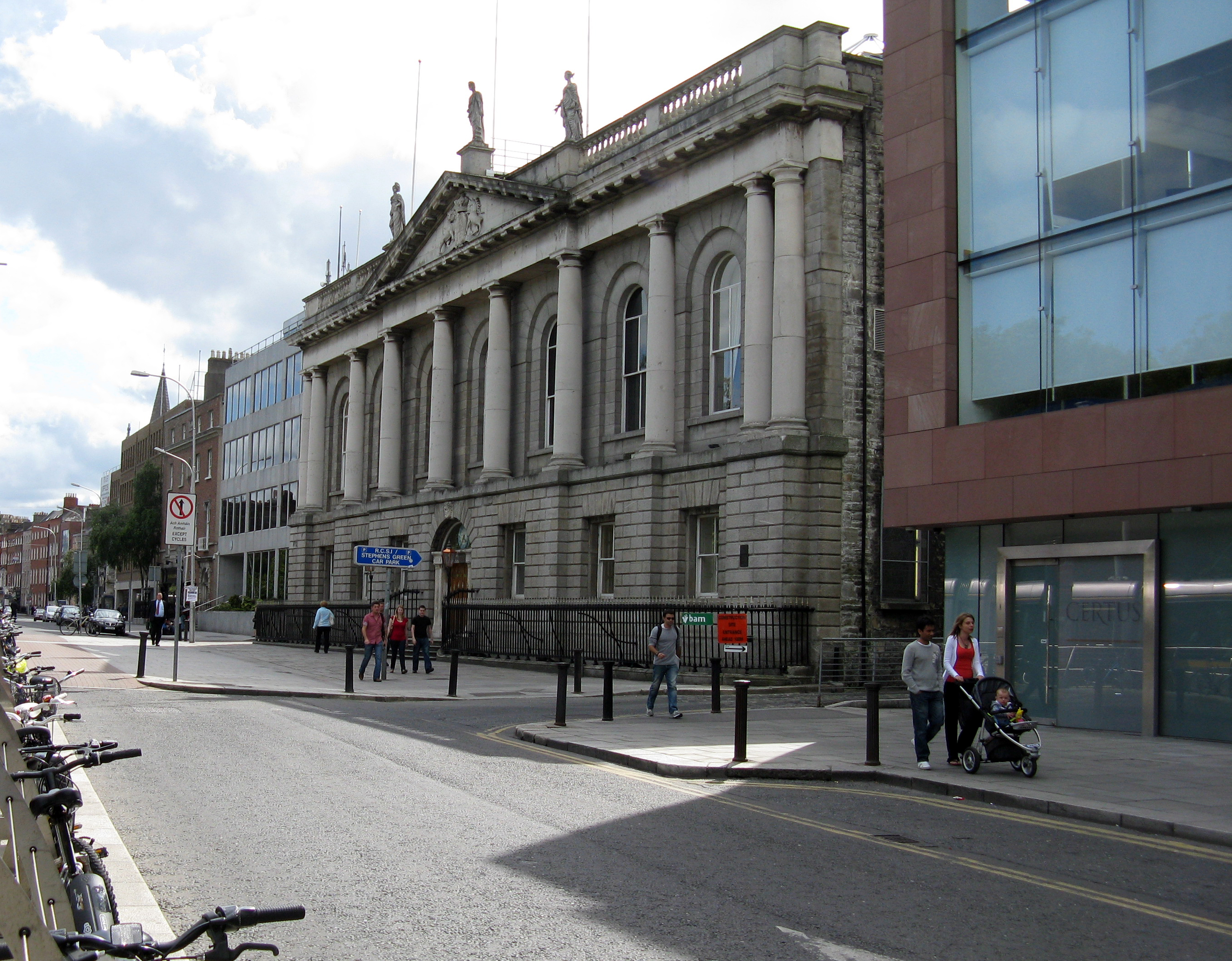
Royal College of Surgeons in Dublin

- Provost's House, Trinity College ("It is built of Golden Hill granite and Ardbraccan limestone")
- Royal College of Surgeons in Ireland, St Stephen's Green ("The walls probably contain a rubble core of Calp limestone. They are faced with ashlared and rusticated blocks of grey Leinster granite, very likely from Golden Hill, Co. Wicklow")

During the construction of Leinster House from 1745 to 1748, the side that faces Merrion Street was built using granite from Golden Hill. When the Office of Public Works undertook restoration works on the building from 2017 to 2019, they chose to use Ballyknockan granite as the nearest substitute as Golden Hill was exhausted by 1850.

The 1997 publication "Ballyknockan. A Wicklow Stonecutters' Village", noted the following about Golden Hill quarry:

Golden Hill is a long low brow in the parish of Kildare not far from the Dublin border. In the building boom of the eighteenth century which resulted in what we know as Georgian Dublin many of the public edifices were constructed of Golden Hill granite. These include the Custom House (completed 1791), the Four Courts, many of the buildings in Trinity College and Nelson's Pillar in 1808 and the General Post Office, opened ten years later. The most substantial building built locally from Golden Hill granite was Russborough, erected by the Leeson family in the 1740s.

=== Closure and move to Ballyknockan ===
In the early 19th century, the quarry at Golden Hill began to yield less, and "most likely" those associated with the quarrying works there moved to Ballyknockan, according to the County Wicklow Heritage page. A 2015 article in The Wicklow People states that a man "called Olligan (or Halligan) led 400 men from Manor Kilbride, on an exodus of near biblical proportions" to Ballyknockan.

A second "great wave" of public building had begun in Dublin in the second quarter of the 19th century, which necessitated continued granite from sources local to Dublin. According to a County Geological Site Report by the Geological Survey of Ireland, the first Ballyknockan quarry was opened in 1824, although other sources say 1820.

By the 1860s, there were numerous granite quarries in Ballyknockan and the site became "probably the most important area for supplying cut stone blocks of granite for the construction of many of Dublin city's major public buildings".

A museum entitled the 'Ballyknockan Quarries Heritage Museum' opened onsite in May 2024.

== See also ==
- Georgian Dublin
