= Silsean =

Mountain in County Wicklow, Ireland

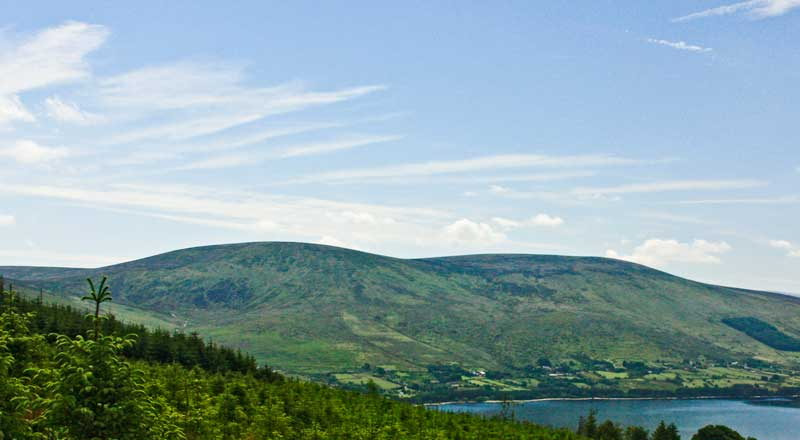
- Moanbane (left) and Silsean (right), as seen from the Blessington lakes in the west.

Highest point
- Elevation: 698 m (2,290 ft)
- Prominence: 43 m (141 ft)
- Listing: Hewitt, Arderin, Simm, Vandeleur-Lynam
- Coordinates: 53.091921°N 6.47351°W

Naming
- Native name: Soillsean
- English translation: place of lights

Geography
- Location within island of Ireland
- Location: County Wicklow, Ireland
- Parent range: Wicklow Mountains
- OSI/OSNI grid: O023056
- Topo map: OSi Discovery 56

Geology
- Mountain type: Pale grey fine to coarse-grained granite

Silsean (Irish: Soillsean, meaning 'place of lights') at 698 metres (2,290 ft), is the 92nd–highest peak in Ireland on the Arderin scale, and the 114th–highest peak on the Vandeleur-Lynam scale.

Silsean is in the central sector, at the western edge, of the Wicklow Mountains, in County Wicklow, Ireland. Silsean is on a small massif alongside Moanbane 703 metres (2,306 ft) which lies between the Blessington lakes (or Poulaphouca Reservoir), and the major massif of Mullaghcleevaun 849 metres (2,785 ft).

The village of Ballyknockan exists on the northern slopes of the hill. Bonfires were lit on the hill in former times to celebrate events, as recorded by Barry Kinane in "Welcome to the Granite City: A Social History of Ballyknockan":

Dr. Walsh, Archbishop of Dublin, visited the parish of Blackditches in July 1907 to administer confirmations... The Archbishop was held in high regard by the men of Ballyknockan since he helped resolve a worker dispute in 1885. The night the Archbishop departed Ballyknockan was described in the Wicklow Notes in vivid detail. The Valley of the Kings River was a natural amphitheatre of rolling hills illuminated by bonfires. An immense beacon was erected by the men of Ballyknockan on Garry Ou Hill (Silsean), and it could be seen as far out as the sea.

== Bibliography ==
- Fairbairn, Helen (2014). Dublin & Wicklow: A Walking Guide. Collins Press. ISBN 978-1848892019.
- Fairbairn, Helen (2014). Ireland's Best Walks: A Walking Guide. Collins Press. ISBN 978-1848892118.
- MountainViews Online Database (Simon Stewart) (2013). A Guide to Ireland's Mountain Summits: The Vandeleur-Lynams & the Arderins. Collins Books. ISBN 978-1-84889-164-7.
- Dillion, Paddy (1993). The Mountains of Ireland: A Guide to Walking the Summits. Cicerone. ISBN 978-1852841102.

== See also ==
- Wicklow Way
- Wicklow Round
- Wicklow Mountains
- Lists of mountains in Ireland
- List of mountains of the British Isles by height
- List of Hewitt mountains in England, Wales and Ireland
