= Moanbane =

Mountain in County Wicklow, Ireland

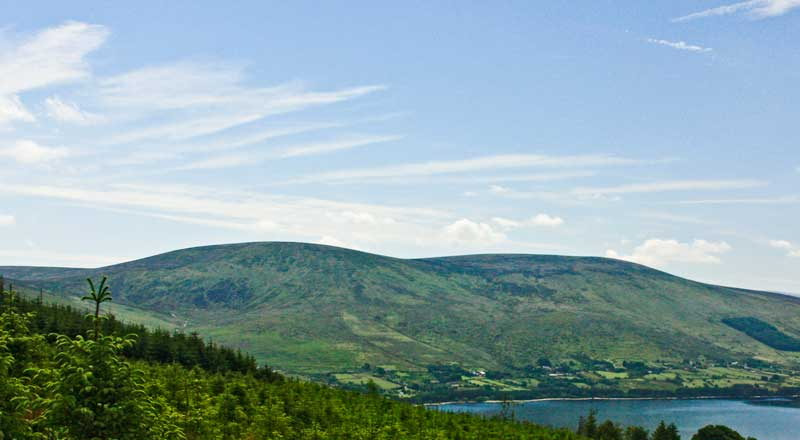
- Moanbane (left) and Silsean (right), as seen from the Blessington lakes in the west.

Highest point
- Elevation: 703 m (2,306 ft)
- Prominence: 108 m (354 ft)
- Listing: 100 Highest Irish Mountains, Hewitt, Arderin, Simm, Vandeleur-Lynam
- Coordinates: 53°06′N 6°28′W

Naming
- Native name: Móin Bhán
- English translation: white bog

Geography
- Location within island of Ireland
- Location: County Wicklow, Ireland
- Parent range: Wicklow Mountains
- OSI/OSNI grid: O033068
- Topo map: OSi Discovery 56

Geology
- Mountain type: Pale grey fine to coarse-grained granite

Moanbane (Irish: Móin Bhán, meaning 'white bog') at 703 metres (2,306 ft), is the 85th–highest peak in Ireland on the Arderin scale, and the 106th–highest peak on the Vandeleur-Lynam scale. Moanbane is in the central sector, at the western edge, of the Wicklow Mountains, in County Wicklow, Ireland. Moanbane is on a small massif alongside Silsean 698 metres (2,290 ft) which lies between the Blessington lakes (or Poulaphouca Reservoir), and the taller mountain of Mullaghcleevaun 849 metres (2,785 ft).

Moanbane's prominence of 108 metres (354 ft), does not qualify it as a Marilyn, but does rank it the 50th-highest mountain in Ireland on the MountainViews Online Database, 100 Highest Irish Mountains, where the minimum prominence threshold for inclusion on the list is 100 metres.

== Bibliography ==
- Fairbairn, Helen (2014). Dublin & Wicklow: A Walking Guide. Collins Press. ISBN 978-1848892019.
- Fairbairn, Helen (2014). Ireland's Best Walks: A Walking Guide. Collins Press. ISBN 978-1848892118.
- MountainViews Online Database (Simon Stewart) (2013). A Guide to Ireland's Mountain Summits: The Vandeleur-Lynams & the Arderins. Collins Books. ISBN 978-1-84889-164-7.
- Dillion, Paddy (1993). The Mountains of Ireland: A Guide to Walking the Summits. Cicerone. ISBN 978-1852841102.

== See also ==
- Wicklow Way
- Wicklow Mountains
- Lists of mountains in Ireland
- List of mountains of the British Isles by height
- List of Hewitt mountains in England, Wales and Ireland
