= Barnacullia quarries =

Granite quarrying area in Dublin, Ireland

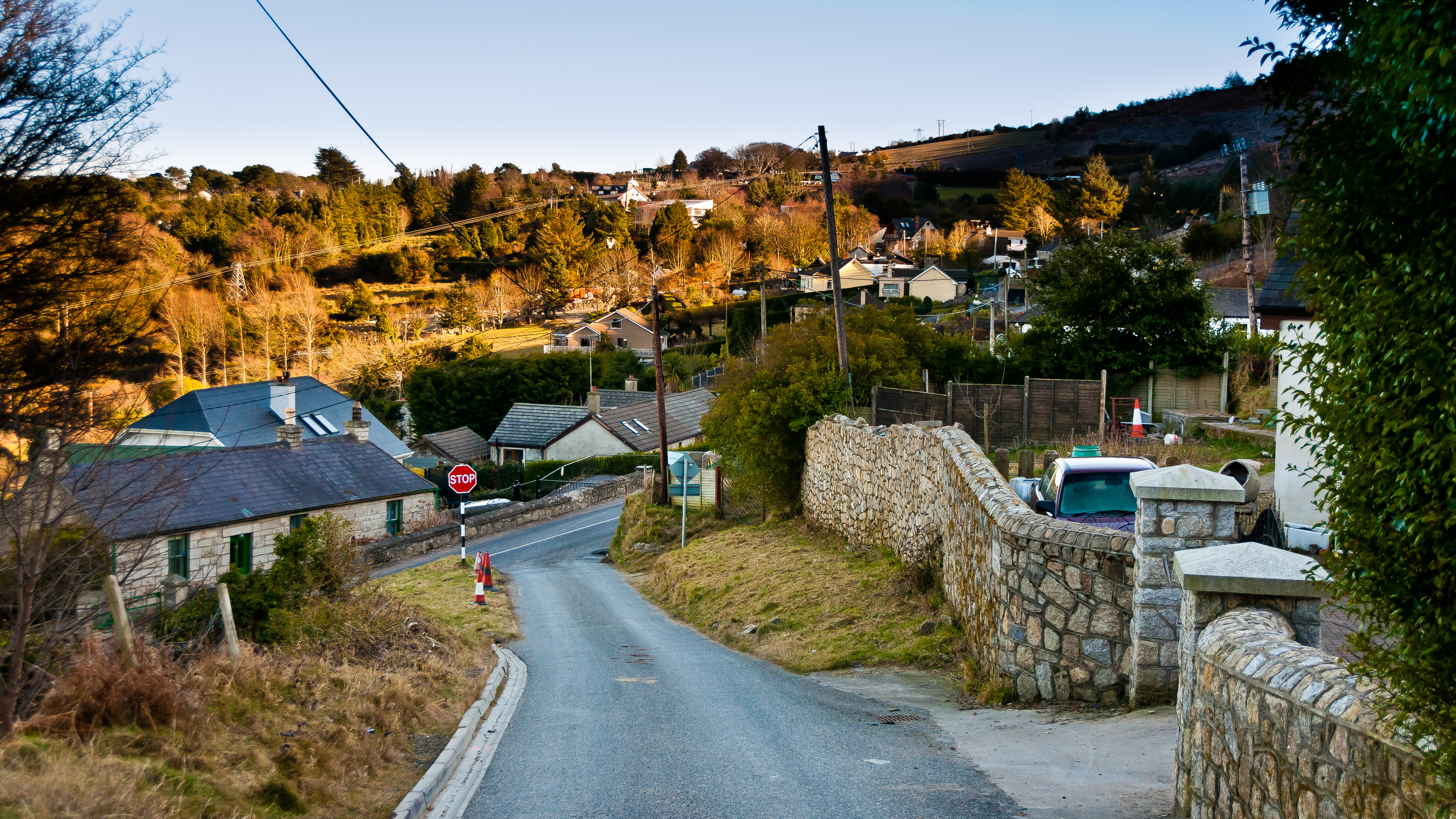
- Evening light in Barnacullia, 2010

- Location within Dublin

Location
- Location: Barnacullia, Sandyford, Dublin 18, Dún Laoghaire–Rathdown, Ireland; 53.2555°N 6.2340°W

Production
- Products: Granite

History
- Opened: 1874 (earliest)

The Barnacullia quarries are a number of former, and current, granite quarries in the townland of Barnacullia on the north-eastern slopes of Three Rock Mountain in County Dublin, Ireland. According to a Historic Landscape Character Assessment (HLCA) conducted in 2006, the area was at one point "an important source of granite for the buildings of nearby Dublin".

The main quarry at Barnacullia is sometimes referred to as Murphystone quarry, after the name of a company who used/uses it, or Blue Light quarry after the name of a well-known nearby pub. Other quarries onsite include Black Quarry, where UPC Communications Ireland Ltd erected a stayed telecommunications mast.

== History ==
=== Background ===
The granite in the Wicklow Mountains, wherein Barnacullia sits, is of Devonian age dating to around 400 million years ago and is part of what is known as the 'Leinster granite batholith' which stretches from Killiney Hill in Dublin southwards to County Carlow. The body of rock is also known in academia as "the Leinster Granite mass", or simply "the Leinster Granite". The wider Dublin area was exploited for its granite for centuries, and it is known that granite quarrying took place at Dalkey quarry, close to Dublin city, from 1680. Granite has also been exploited on the island of Ireland in counties Galway, Donegal and Down.

Prior to 1720, calp limestone was the main stone building material used in Dublin, and was quarried locally in the suburbs of Palmerstown, Kimmage, Rathgar and Donnybrook (where a Dublin Bus depot exists today). After this date, imported limestones, sandstones and granites began to replace the calp as they became more popular. The nearest granite sources to Dublin were the quarries of south County Dublin and north-west County Wicklow. Granite from the Wicklow and Dublin Mountains, and limestone from the immediate hinterland, came to be the primary sources of stone used in the construction of Dublin city, and came to being recognised as "characteristic to Dublin" in the same way that basalt from County Antrim and granite from the Mourne Mountains have come to typify Belfast's buildings.

An un-dated County Geological Site Report carried out by the Geological Survey of Ireland at Barnacullia confirmed that the area embodies "the most northerly of three large plutons or batholiths that together comprise the Leinster Granite", and is "approximately 405 million years old." The granite at Barnacullia is "classified by geologists as Type 3 muscovite porphyritic" and exhibits "large crystals of the mica mineral muscovite set in an equigranular matrix".

A type of glacial meltwater channel, coined the "Barnacullia subglacial chute", was described by Hoare and Hoare in 1976. They were unable to ascertain a date for the feature owing to the lack of glacial deposits.

It is worth noting that during the heyday of the quarries, Barnacullia existed at the southern end of County Dublin. Since 1994, the county has been subdivided into four subdivision counties and the quarries are now under the jurisdiction of the county of Dún Laoghaire–Rathdown.

==== Leinster granite types ====
According to Wyse Jackson and Caulfield:

"Within the Leinster granite batholith... a number of plutons, or individual masses of granite, formed and each has a distinctive textural characteristic. The granites that were quarried at Baltyboys, Blessington, Woodend, Threecastles and Golden Hill in west County Wicklow, as well as those from Glencree, consist of crystals that were of smaller size having been formed at the same time, whereas granite from Three Rock Mountain and Glencullen contained conspicious crystals of mica up to half an inch (12 mm) wide..."

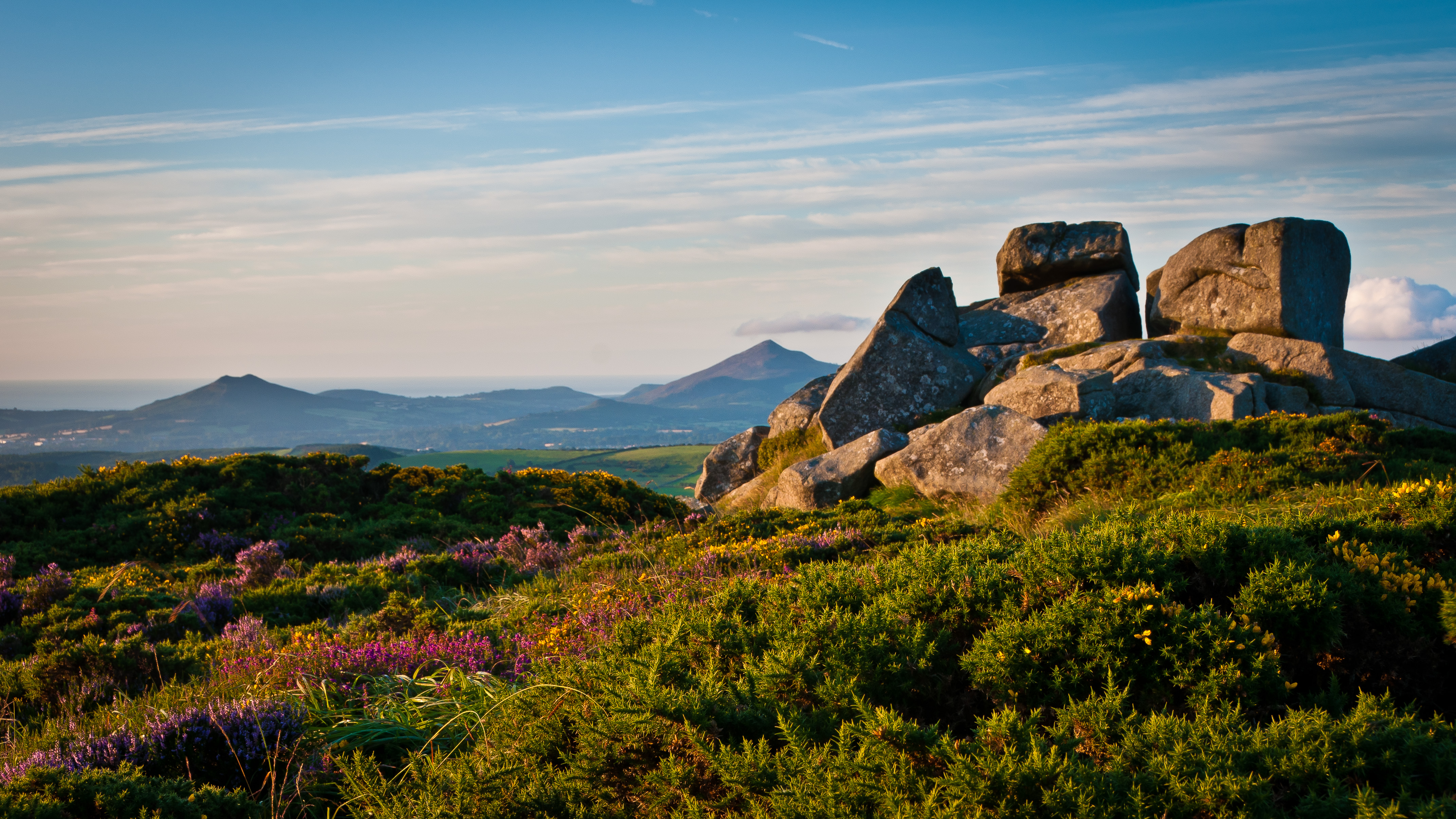
One of three granite tors, or rocky outcrops, on the summit of Three Rock Mountain (from which the mountain got its name)

Granite of the "Glencree" variety from the eastern side of the batholith (the same side on which Barnacullia sits), were used by Viscount Powerscourt in the construction of his Powerscourt Estate (built 1731–41) and Powerscourt House (built 1771–74) in the city. According to Hayes, other granite quarries in the vicinity of Powerscourt included Toneygarrow, Lough Bray and Ballybrew, all of which are in County Wicklow. Other granite quarries in the greater Dublin area (but limited to County Dublin) included Kilgobbin and Golden Ball; both of which are adjacent to Barnacullia.

In 1976, the old Parliament House in Dublin began undergoing a period of restoration, having been subjected to the elements for 250 years. Speaking on RTÉ Radio 1, Jim Murphy, the contractor responsible for supplying the replacement granite, noted that he had already seen four distinct granite types represented in the fabric of the building; namely those from Dalkey, Barnacullia, Glencullen, and "an awful lot" from the Ballyknockan area. Murphy was able to distinguish between the different granites by the appearance of their surfaces, and "big scale" of mica present in some stones versus others.

=== Establishment ===
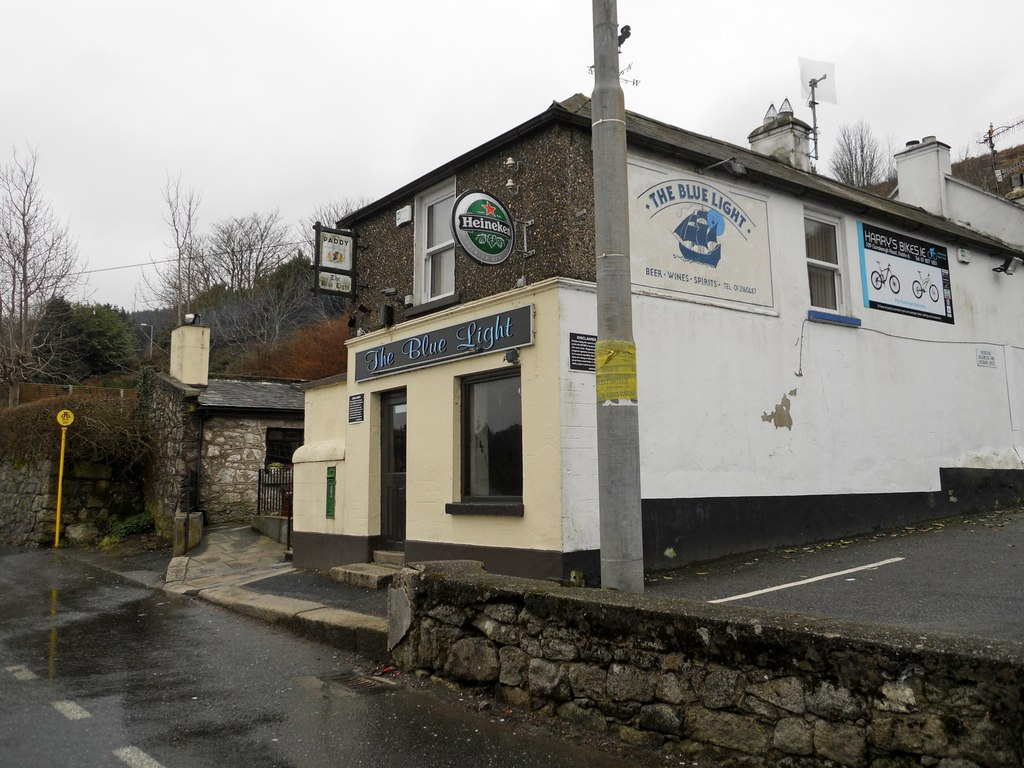
The Blue Light pub in 2013

Possibly before the quarrying of granite, Barnacullia was considered an important source of peat (commonly known as 'turf' in Ireland) which was a ready source of fuel to heat homes in nearby Dublin. Writing in 1772, John Rutty observed that Dublin was being supplied by turf from Glenasmole, Barnacullia and Castlekelly bogs.

According to the Geological Survey of Ireland, "there is a very long tradition of granite quarrying in the Barnacullia townland, although other quarries have closed down and become abandoned and flooded". An Ordnance Survey Ireland map from 1864 shows that there were numerous quarries in the townland, as well as forges. The HLCA notes that "the land in the region was used for agriculture also, with many of the stonecutters families having small plots which they farmed".

The local pub, The Blue Light, is included on maps dating back to at least 1853, "but is likely much older" according to a 2018 article on TheJournal.ie. The pub's official website describes their link to the local quarrying tradition:

"They say that granite in the mountain breeds a certain kind of men. The Blue Light is a pub built from hand-cut stone in Barnacullia – from the Irish 'top of the woods' – a small village community set amongst the old granite quarries in the Dublin Mountains. When the pub began entertaining quarrymen in the 1700s, taxes on imported spirits were so high that the locals needed to be resourceful...".

According to TheJournal.ie article, "There were once six shebeens (bars) on the same road" as the pub, but by 2018 the Blue Light was the only pub still standing.

=== Operations ===
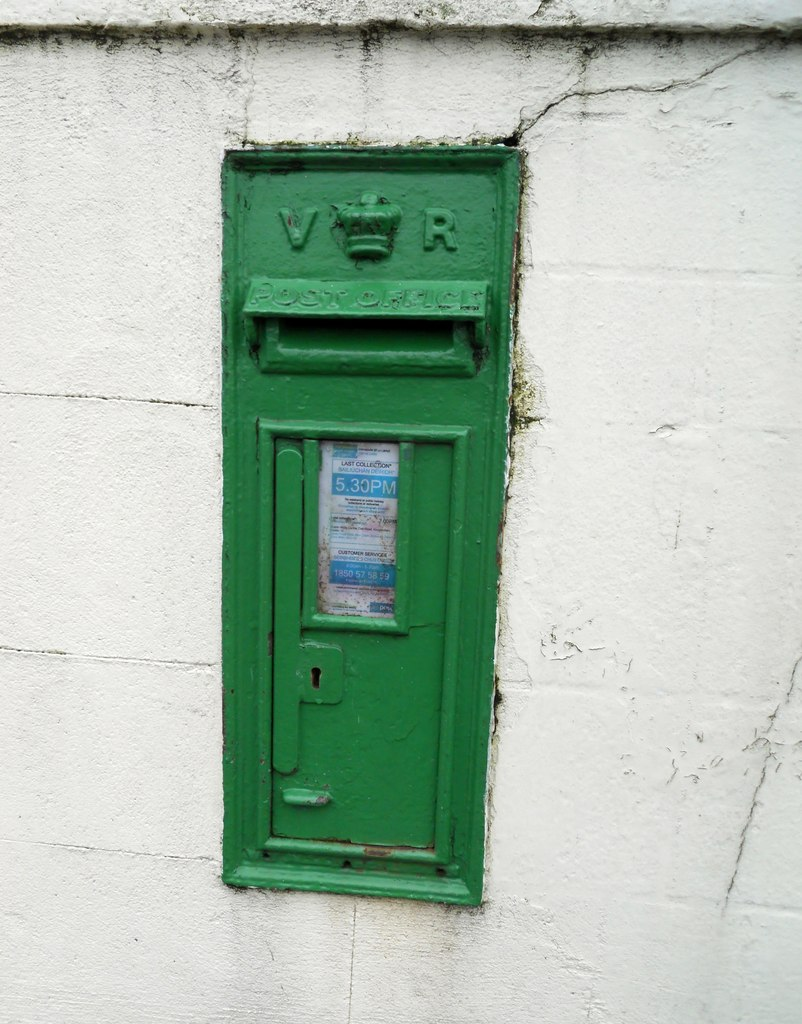
A Victorian era (1837–1901) post-box in the wall of the Blue Light pub

Anne Kane, who was born in 1890 and grew up on the slopes of Three Rock Mountain, was interviewed by RTÉ in 1976 and recalled how the Second Boer War (1899–1902) had brought a time of deep depression to the stoneworkings at Barnacullia quarries.

Edgar F. Keatinge, writing in the Dublin Historical Record in 1947, recalled his upbringing in the Dublin suburb of Rathmines where he "frequently" heard Barnacullia stone being sold by street cry:

"In Palmerstown Road I frequently saw a very country-looking mountainy man with a flowing beard... Well, this man was the only vendor I have ever heard selling and crying "Freestone! Freestone!" and I remember hearing that he came from a place I have since learned to know very well, but which was then in the wilds of the country, called Barnacullia."

From 1910 to 1916, Irish nationalist Constance Markievicz rented a local cottage where she would paint in her free time. Markievicz was called to a Barnacullia quarry lake on Sunday 27 July 1913, along with two members of Na Fianna, to assist when a youth named Peter Doyle got into difficulty and drowned while swimming with his friends.

At the outset of the First World War in 1914, many stonecutters from Barnacullia moved to the granite quarry at Trefor in Wales for employment. After the Irish Civil War ended in 1923, many workers still remaining in Ireland were employed producing stone for repairing the buildings which had been damaged during the period, such as the GPO, Custom House and Four Courts.

Granite for the Irish National War Memorial Gardens, which were begun in 1932 at Islandbridge in Dublin came from quarries in Ballyknockan as well as Barnacullia and the carved stonework was carried out by Irish stonemasons. There was also a period of intense church building not long after, many of which were built using granite. Jim Murphy remembers that for the commission for Mullingar Cathedral (built 1933–1936), roughly 200 stone cutters were employed at various quarries all over Three Rock Mountain for a time.

By the 1940s, the number of quarries at Barnacullia had dropped to five. In 1953, Professor James C. Brindley, described the quarry areas at Three Rock Mountain as "extensive", but did not clarify how many were still being actively quarried.

In 1981, the filmmakers involved with the TV series Hands visited Barnacullia to film works onsite for its episode entitled "Stone". The episode included a segment on the work of Paddy Roe, a stonecutter from the Dublin Mountains, who was working on a replacement right hand for the statue of Hibernia (the female personification of Ireland) who stands as the central statue on the south pediment of the former Irish Parliament building in central Dublin. Roe had also carved Hibernia a new head, although this was not shown in the episode. Concurrent to being a stonecutter, Roe was also a teacher of stone carving at the National College of Art and Design at the time. The episode also filmed workmen setting a replacement facing wall of granite blocks at the building. Stonecutters from Ballyknockan as well as Barnacullia were employed in the restoration works.

=== Usage of Barnacullia granite ===
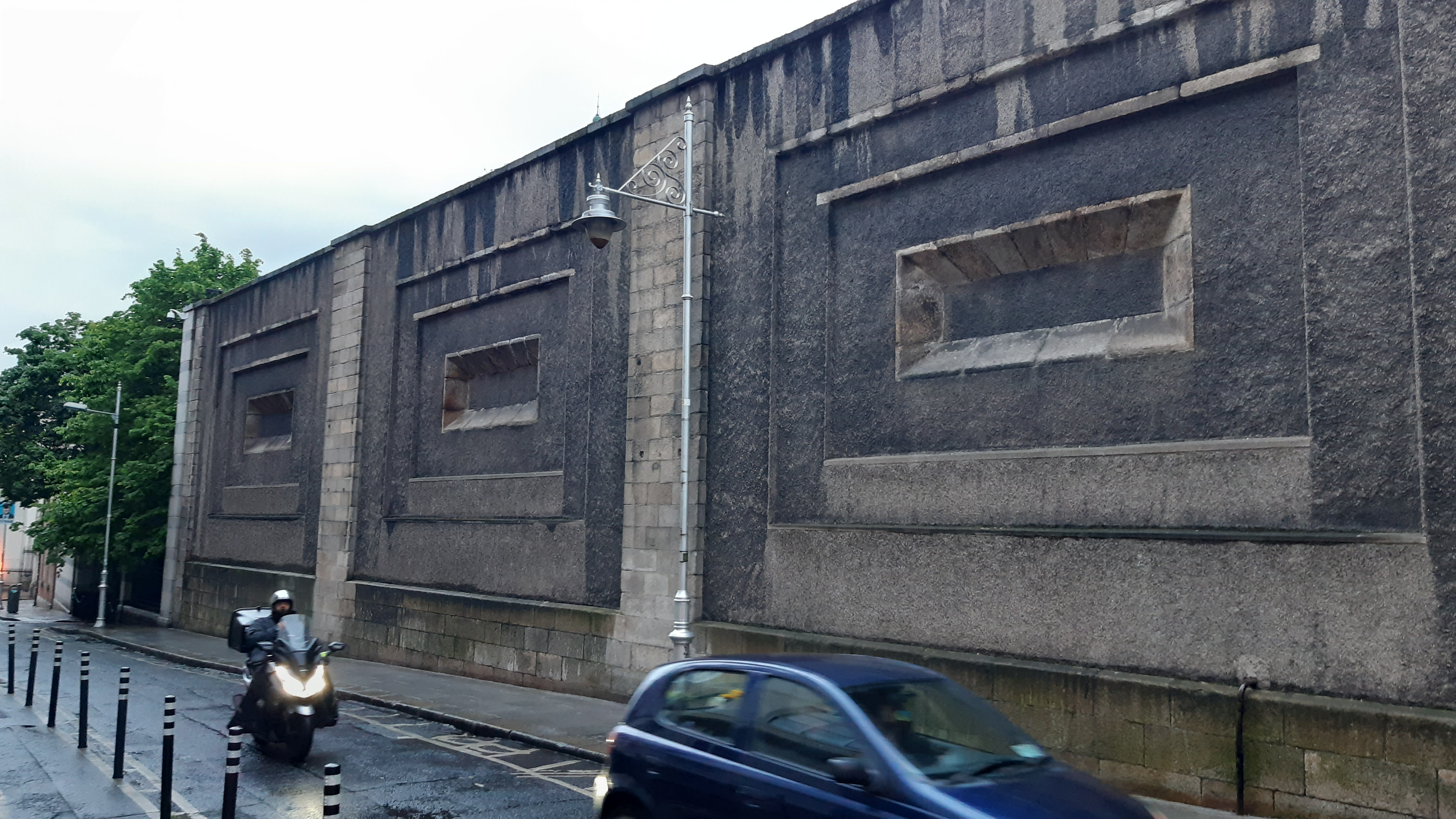
The high wall on Castle Street, Dublin containing "insets of granite" from Three Rock Mountain

In his book "The Building Stones of Dublin: A Walking Guide", published in 1993, Wyse Jackson noted the use of Barnacullia granite, or Three Rock Mountain granite, in a number of city centre buildings:

- The high wall on Castle Street, with its stucco face, has insets of granite from Three Rock Mountain. "This granite is characterised by large, flat, platy, silvery mica crystals up to one centimetre in width and three centimetres in length, and large, pale feldspars which are set into a fine-grained matrix or groundmass dominated by quartz."

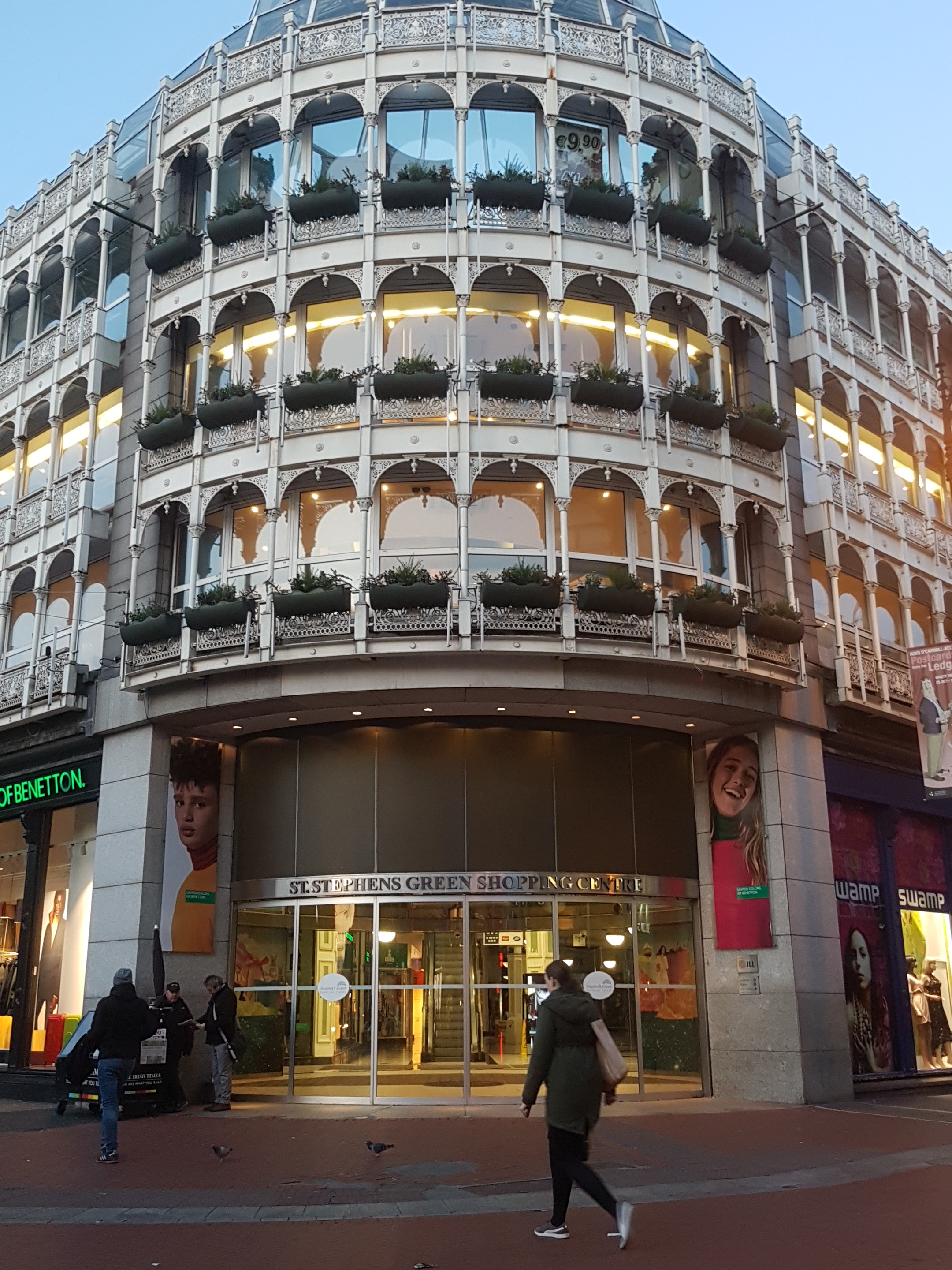
The entrance to Stephen's Green Shopping Centre, with granite pillars and facing

- Stephen's Green Shopping Centre: "The recently built St Stephen's Green Centre (opened 1988)... is faced in Barnacullia granite from Co. Dublin. This granite is similar to that from Ballybrew, except that it contains large micas fifteen to twenty millimetres in length, which appear like crayon marks in cut surfaces."
- 9-11 O'Connell Street (corner of Cathedral Street): "The building occupied by Burger King is not remarkable. However, it is worth looking at, because at ground-floor level four different stone types have been used. There are all currently available and are typical of stone used in the last two decades. The pale granite is from Barnacullia, Co. Dublin; the black stone is gabbro; the red granite is the Swedish Balmoral red; while above the plate glass windows the cream-coloured Portland stone is used."

==== Granite flagstones ====
In 1976, Peter "Gocksy" McCabe, a stone cutter in Barnacullia, bemoaned the fact that Dublin Corporation had recently moved from using granite flagstones to using slabs of concrete for the city paths all across the city. For the past 200 years, Dublin Corporation, under the auspices of the Commissioners for Paving the Streets of Dublin, had adopted "wholesale" the use of granite for their paving in the city since the 1770s, replacing the use of calp limestone which they had used before that since medieval times.

In 1993, Wyse Jackson welcomed the renewed use of granite paving and kerbing in at least one location outside the Mont Clare Hotel (since 2019 renamed as The Mont), on Merrion Street Lower, which had been recently re-laid using County Wicklow granite. "Apart from being more attractive, the granite offers better grip to pedestrians, particularly when it is raining", he wrote.

==== Diminishing use ====
From 1960 until at least 1993, concrete buildings in Dublin were "usually" still "covered with a thin veneer or cladding of cut stone" (rarely more than 2 cm thick), according to Wyse Jackson, utilising "granite and other igneous rocks, from Wicklow, or imported from Scandinavia, Brazil and elsewhere". This was noted at the International Financial Services Centre (IFSC) where "native and imported granites (were) used side by side".

=== Modern era ===
In 1994, the 'Directory of Active Quarries, Pits and Mines in Ireland' published by the GSI included Barnacullia Quarry (singular) as Quarry number 55. The operator was listed as James Murphy & Sons Ltd., and the products listed as: "Granite suitable for building, monumental and ecclesiastical work. Availability: Up to 4 tons in weight. Large quantities available".

In August 2006, it was reported that Murphystone (the trade name of James Murphy & Sons Ltd, founded in 1890 in Dublin) were due to move to a new factory and offices near their Barnacullia quarry. The factory was intended to have a "new 2,7 m diameter circular saw to complement an existing one, for all primary sawing". Gerry Cotter, sales director at the time was quoted as saying: "Our granite quarry has a good future. Experienced users know that when Chinese grey granite weathers, it has no life". In 2006, Murphystone employed around 20 staff and their turnover in 2005 had been "around €2,000,000". At the time, they did not supply granite outside of Ireland.

As of 2007, Murphystone were in ownership of a granite quarry at Barnacullia, as well as an Irish blue limestone quarry in County Roscommon. That same year Murphystone obtained a contract to supply 700-800 metres^{2} of granite to the Planning Department of a Local Authority who had insisted on the use of local stone in their works.

On 23 April 2015, the DLR Lexicon library in Dún Laoghaire hosted a screening of the "Stone" episode of Hands. The library advertised the event thus: "Join us for a special screening of "Stone" which captured the long tradition of stone working in the Barnacullia / Glencullen area of Dún Laoghaire-Rathdown County".

In a May 2019 article in Building Ireland magazine, Tom Murphy, managing director of Murphystone, confirmed that the company were still operating from the same quarry in Barnacullia. Supplementing the product from their own quarries, they also sourced materials from elsewhere, including "stone products from Italy, Spain, Portugal, Germany, China and the rest of the world"."

In their Draft County Development Plan 2022–2028, Dún Laoghaire–Rathdown County Council identified Barnacullia as an 'Historic Landscape Character Area' (HLCA), and noted that five other HLCAs had been identified in the county to date: Barnacullia, Kiltiernan͖, Glencullen, Ballycorus–Rathmichael, and Old Connaught.

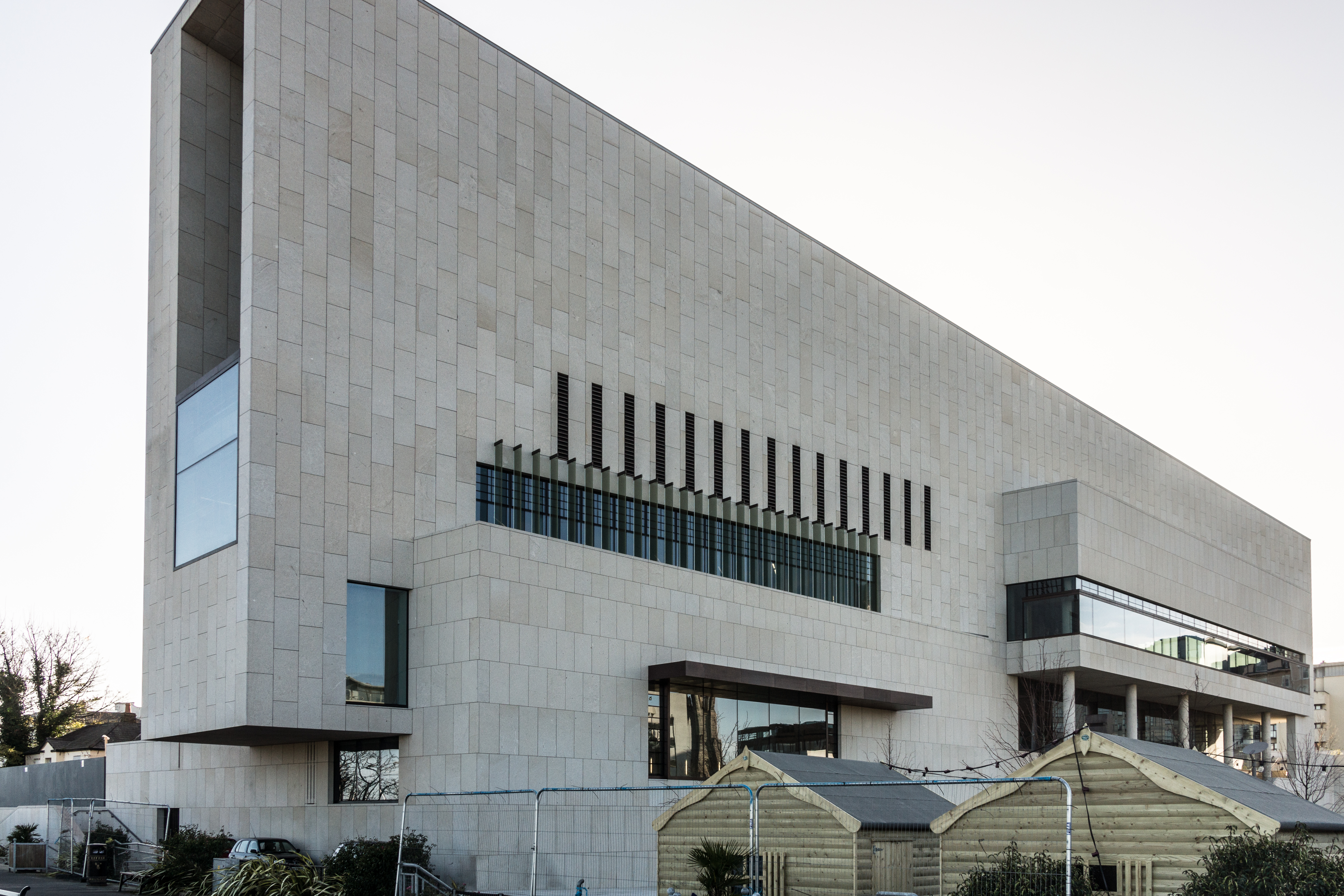
Side view of Dún Laoghaire's DLR Lexicon, completed in 2014

As of 2024, Murphystone are still in existence and advertise their stone as quarried from Sandyford although their business address is in Barnacullia. Amongst the commercial projects Murphystone have supplied stone to include:

- The Merrion Hotel, Dublin
- Brown Thomas, Grafton Street, Dublin
- Bank of Ireland, Waterford
- Teagasc College of Amenity Horticulture, Botanic Gardens
- Dún Laoghaire Shopping Centre
- DLR Lexicon, Dún Laoghaire

In September 2023, the 928 m^{2} workshed and concrete-surfaced worksite at the main quarry was advertised to let on harvey.ie, an Irish industrial and logistics property market website, under the title "Former Murphy Stone Facility, Bluelight Quarry, Barnacullia, Dublin 18, D18 E043". The lease terms and annual rent were available on application. The actual quarry adjoining the workshed was not listed as part of the site for rent.

In November 2024, the 928 m^{2} industrial unit of the "former Murphy Stone Facility, Bluelight Quarry, Barnacullia, Sandyford, Dublin 18" was put up for rent on Irish property website Daft.ie.

== Flora ==
Barnacullia is mentioned by English poet Winifred M. Letts (1882–1972) in her poem Saint Brigit Passes:

"At Barnacullia all the whins
Were bright to see as guinea gold,
And in Kilternan primroses
Peeped kindly at me from the mould;".

== See also ==
- Barnacullia stream, near the village of Tynagh, County Galway
- The Blue Light, a Barnacullia pub dating from at least 1853, well known for its Irish music and trad sessions
- Two Rock Mountain, a nearby mountain which also supported stone working
