= Ireland's Memorial Records, 1914–1918 =

Irish volumes of World War I death records

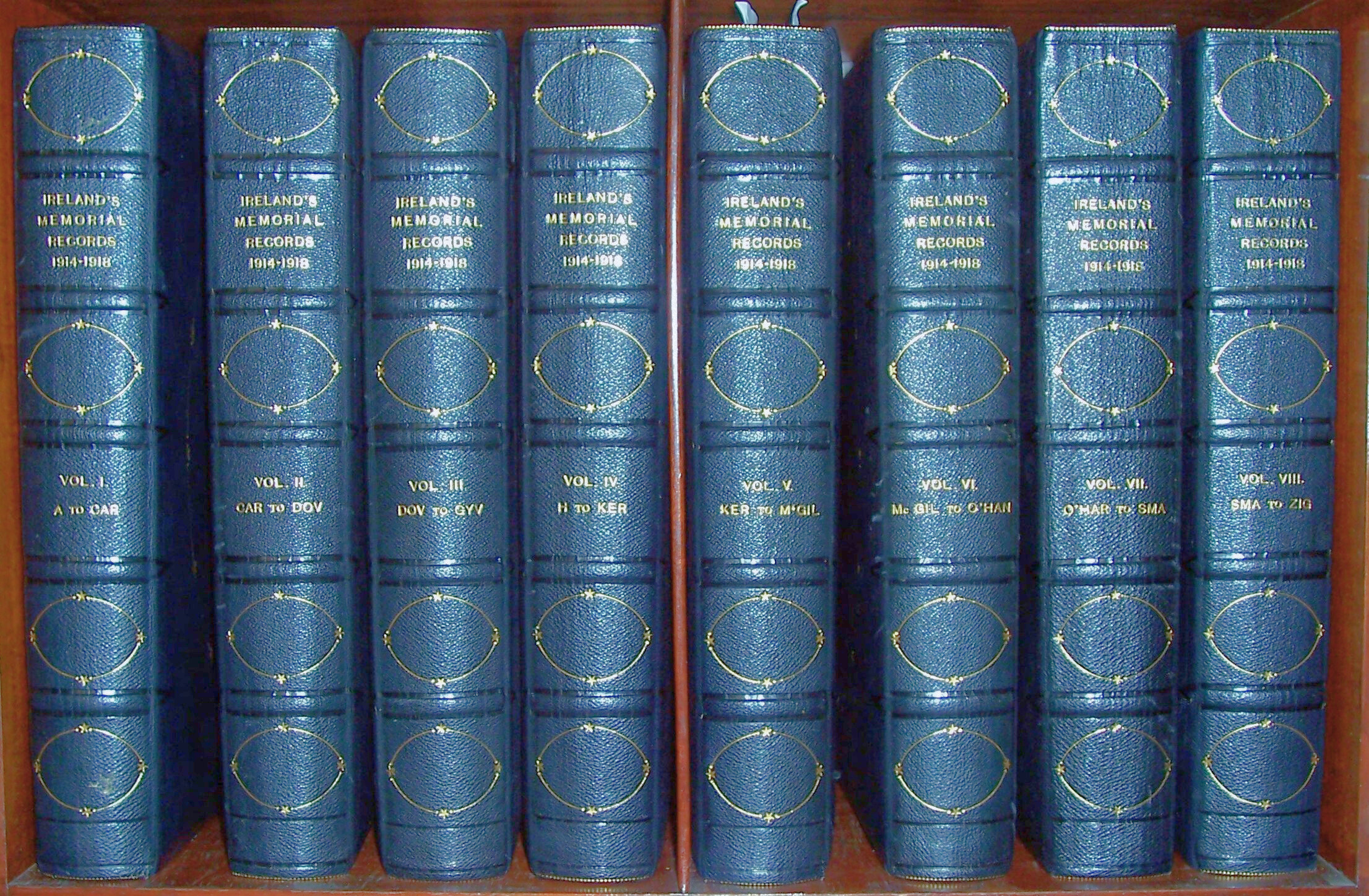
Ireland's Memorial Records, 1914–1918

Ireland's Memorial Records, 1914–1918 is a set of eight volumes published in 1923 containing the names of more than 49,000 Irish soldiers who died during the First World War. The work was compiled by the Committee of the Irish National War Memorial and illustrated with decorative borders designed by Irish artist Harry Clarke (1889–1931). The books were compiled, designed, and produced during one of Ireland's most turbulent periods: the Irish War of Independence (1919–1921) and the subsequent Irish Civil War (1922–1923). The volumes form one of the earliest large-scale attempts to record Ireland's war dead and remain a significant historical reference work.

== Background ==
Following the end of the First World War, a national initiative was launched in Ireland to commemorate those from the island who had died in the conflict. On 17 July 1919, a National War Memorial Committee was established at a meeting attended by more than one hundred people from across the country. The meeting was chaired by Sir John French, Earl of Ypres at the Viceregal Lodge in Phoenix Park, Dublin. The original Standing Committee consisted of twelve members.

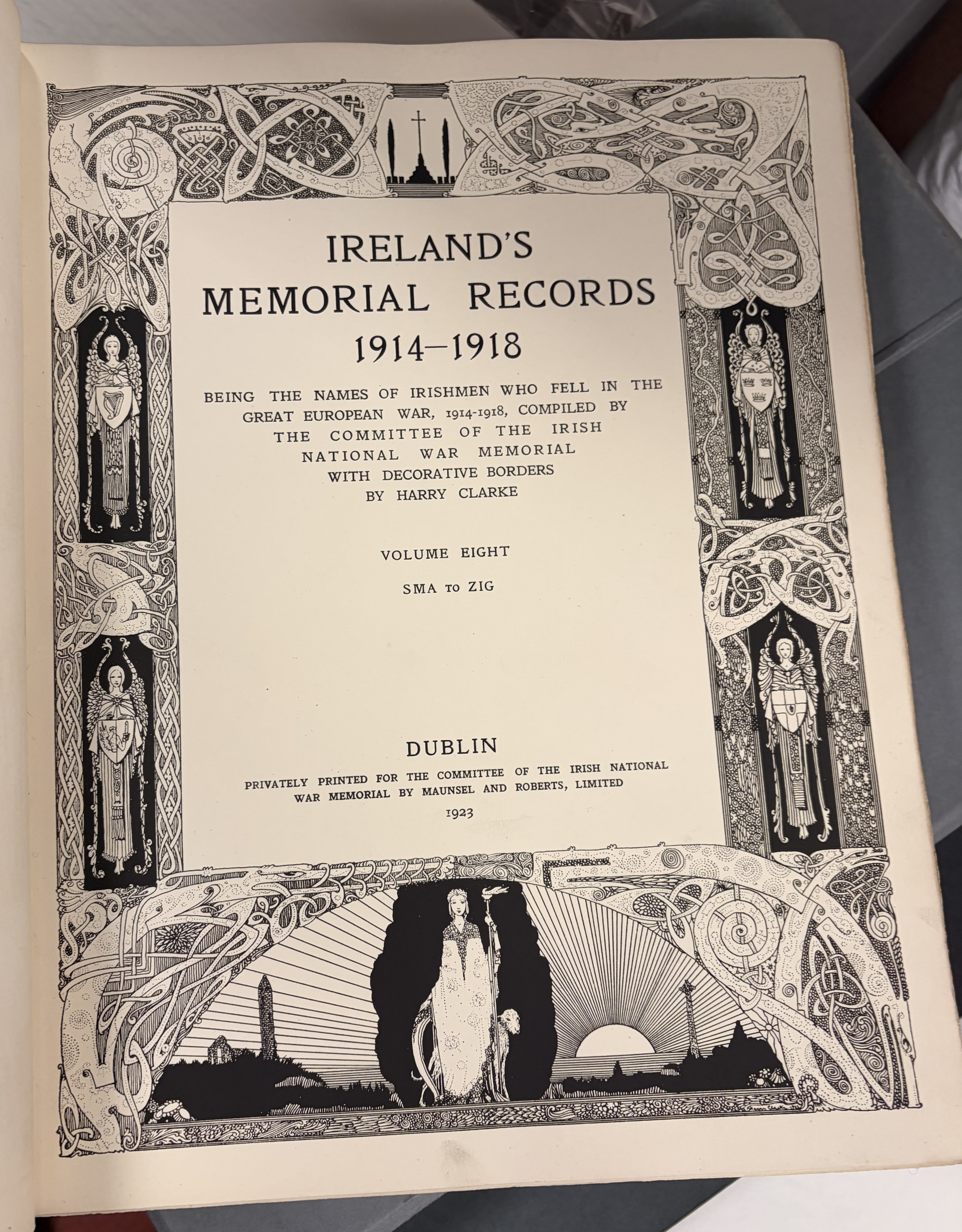
Frontpage Ireland's Memorial Records, 1914-1918

The role of the committee was to act as steward for funds raised by public subscription, which by 1919 amounted to more than £50,000. Its aim was to create a suitable memorial to commemorate all those Irish men and women killed in the First World War.

The committee decided that the commemoration should take two forms:

- the compilation of a complete register of the dead, published as Ireland's Memorial Records, 1914–1918
- the construction of a permanent national memorial, later realised as the Irish National War Memorial Gardens at Islandbridge in Dublin.

== Artwork and design ==
Each page is surrounded by decorative borders in black and white designed by Harry Clarke, one of Ireland's most prominent illustrators of the early twentieth century. Clarke completed the artwork between 1919 and 1922.

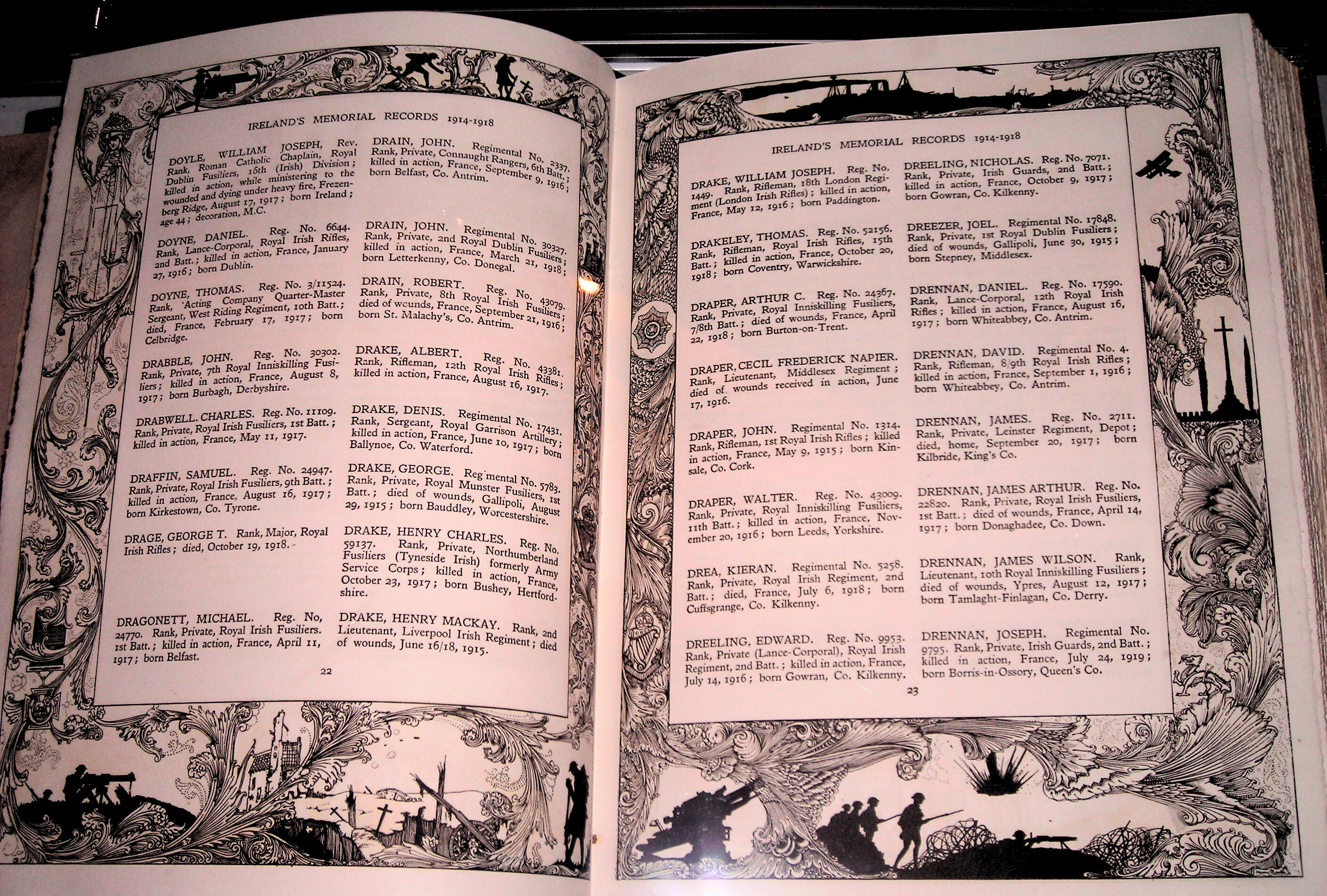
Ireland's Memorial Records, 1914-1918 - Vol.3 p.22 & 23 with a.o. William Doyle. Decorative borders with scenes of trench warfare.

He created seven different designs which were repeated and reversed throughout the set, a front page, and a last page (sixteen different arrangements in total). The borders combine Celtic and Art Deco influences and include scenes of trench warfare, ruined buildings, silhouettes of fighting soldiers, graves, aeroplanes, tanks, regimental badges, religious imagery, and symbolic references to Allied forces.

Two companies were responsible for the engraving of the illustrations - The Irish Photo Engraving Company and The Dublin Illustrating Company.

== Publication ==
The final publication consisted of eight large-format volumes containing 3,177 pages and the names of approximately 49,435 individuals who died while serving during the war. Names were listed alphabetically and usually included rank, regiment, service number, date of death, and in many cases the place of birth and place of death.

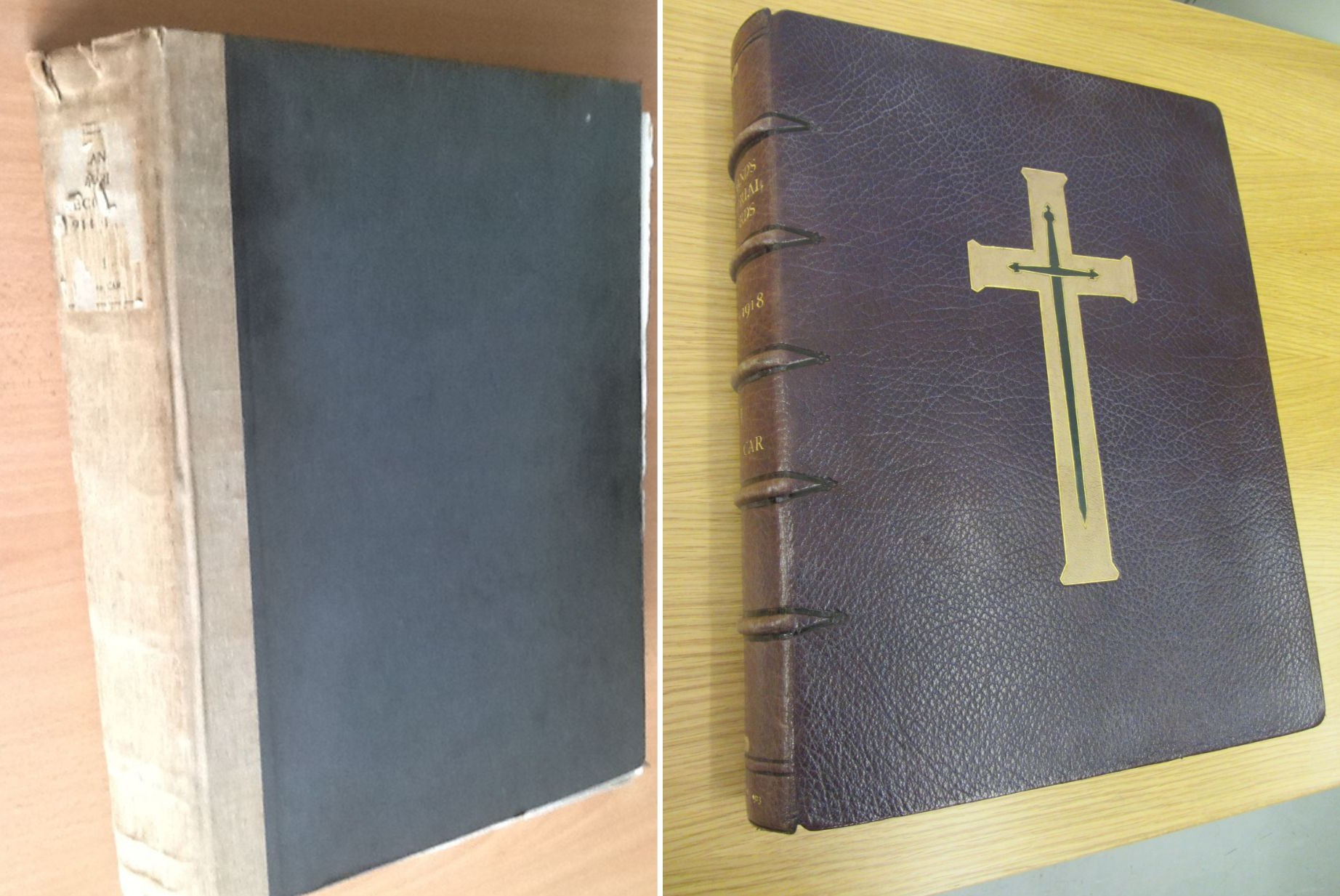
Difference in binding: linen spine (left) versus leather binding (right) of Ireland's Memorial Records.

The books (12" by 10") were printed in Dublin by "Maunsel & Roberts" on handmade paper and bound in several formats, including paper boards with linen spines, bearing a label reading "Galway & Co., binders", and more elaborate hard covers for presentation copies. One hundred complete sets were produced at a cost of £5,000. The sets were distributed to libraries, churches, and institutions in Ireland and abroad, with the intention that every library of note would hold one in its catalogue.

== Historical debate ==
From the outset, questions arose over what "Irish" meant in terms of who should be included. Almost from the start, the Memorial Records faced criticism about the lack of completeness and accuracy. The Records were meant to honour every fallen Irish soldier, sailor, and airman. While army casualties are well documented, historians have found omissions, duplicates, and errors—especially for those in the Navy, Air Force, and Colonial Regiments, where only names from private sources and press reports could be included. The committee also assumed that all members of Irish regiments were Irish, while some Irish-born individuals who served in British, colonial, or foreign units were not included.

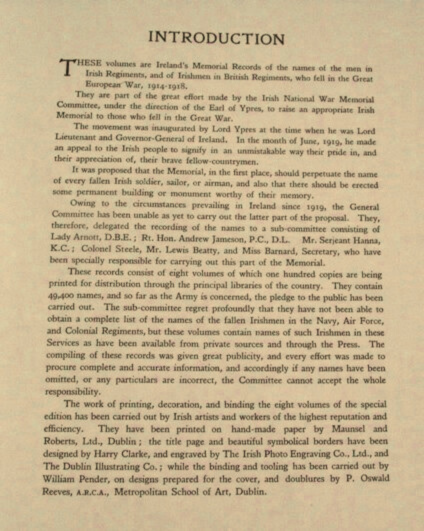
Introduction page of Ireland's Memorial Records.

Modern historical projects and archival work have suggested that the total number of Irish war dead is higher than that recorded in the volumes. The 49,435 names represent only a fraction of the Irish people who died as a result of the First World War.

Despite the shortcomings, the work remains one of the most detailed early registers of Irish casualties in the First World War and an important documentary source for the study of Ireland's participation in the First World War. In addition to its historical value, the publication is notable for the artistic contribution of Harry Clarke and for its role in the broader effort to create a national memorial during a politically complex period in Irish history.

== Preservation and later use ==
Ireland's Memorial Records in the Irish National War Memorial Gardens

Copies of the Memorial Records are preserved in several institutions, including the Irish National War Memorial Gardens, designed by Edwin Lutyens, where the eight volumes are displayed in the south-east bookroom.

In the late twentieth and early twenty-first centuries, the records were digitised and republished in several formats. In 1995, the books were made available on CD-ROM by Eneclann. In 2003, a paper version was reissued by the Naval & Military Press. In 2014, an online archive of Ireland's Memorial Records was launched by the In Flanders Fields Museum in Ypres in collaboration with Google and the Irish Department of Foreign Affairs and Trade.

== Locations of Ireland's Memorial Records ==
A complete list of recipients of the books is not known, has not been preserved or may never have been compiled, although 100 complete sets were produced. The following is a list of libraries, churches, museums and organizations that are known to hold an original set of Ireland's Memorial Records. Not all of them were supplied in the original deliveries of the 1920s. Some of these copies were acquired by purchase in more recent times.

- 1. Irish National War Memorial Gardens, Dublin, Ireland — photo
- 2. British Library, London, England — photo
- 3. Saint-Patrick's Cathedral, Dublin, Ireland — photo
- 4. In Flanders Fields Museum, Ypres, Belgium — photo
- 5. Vatican Library, Vatican City — photo
- 6. Imperial War Museum, London, England — photo
- 7. Trinity College Library, Dublin, Ireland — photo
- 8. Marsh's Library, Dublin, Ireland — photo
- 9. Downpatrick Library, Downpatrick, Northern Ireland — photo
- 10. St. Peter's Church, Portlaoise, Ireland — photo
- 11. Royal College of Surgeons in Ireland, Dublin, Ireland — photo
- 12. Linen Hall Library, Belfast, Northern Ireland — photo
- 13. Saint Canice's Cathedral, Kilkenny, Ireland — photo
- 14. Belfast Central Library, Belfast, Northern Ireland — photo
- 15. St Anne's Cathedral, Belfast, Northern Ireland — photo
- 16. Dublin City Library and Archive, Dublin, Ireland — photo
- 17. Royal Irish Academy, Dublin, Ireland — photo
- 18. Australian War Memorial Research Centre, Canberra, Australia — photo
- 19. James Hardiman Library - Galway, Ireland — photo
- 20. The Somme Heritage Centre, Conlig, Northern Ireland — photo
- 21. Library of Congress, Washington, US — photo
- 22. National Library of Scotland, Edinburgh, Scotland — photo
- 23. National Library of Wales, Aberystwyth, Wales — photo
- 24. Ulster Historical Foundation, Belfast, Northern Ireland — photo
- 25. Saint Columb's Cathedral, Derry, Northern Ireland — photo
- 26. Military History Society of Ireland, Dublin, Ireland — photo
- 27. Royal Irish Fusiliers Museum, Armagh, Northern Ireland — photo
- 28. Stephen's Green Club, Dublin, Ireland — photo
- 29. Hibernian United Services Club / Stephen's Green Club, Dublin, Ireland — photo
- 30. National Archives of Belgium, Brussels, Belgium — photo
- 31. National Museum of Ireland, Dublin, Ireland — photo
- 32. Royal Dublin Society, Dublin, Ireland — photo
- 33. Queen's University, Belfast, Northern Ireland — photo
- 34. The Inniskillings Museum, Enniskillen, Northern Ireland — photo
- 35. New York Public Library, New York, US — photo
- 36. National Library of New Zealand, Wellington, New Zealand — photo
- 37. Burns Library, Boston, Massachusetts, United States — photo
- 38. King's Inns, Dublin, Ireland — photo
- 39. National College of Art and Design, Dublin, Ireland — photo
- 40. Thurles Library (The Source), Thurles, Ireland — photo
- 41. Bodleian Library, Oxford, England — photo
- 42. Canadian War Museum, Ottawa, Canada — photo
- 43. Mitchell Library, Glasgow, Scotland — photo
- 44. National Library of South Africa, Cape Town, South Africa— photo
- 45. Liverpool Central Library, Liverpool, England — photo
- 46. Louth County Library, Dundalk, Ireland — photo
- 47. Limerick City and County Library, Limerick, Ireland — photo
- 48. Kerry Library, Tralee, Ireland — photo
- 49. Dlr LexIcon Library, Dún Laoghaire, Ireland — photo
- 50. Royal Irish Yacht Club, Dún Laoghaire, Ireland — photo
- 51. House of Commons Library, London, England — photo
- 52. Methodist Centenary Church, Dublin, Ireland — photo (lost in a fire in 1968)
- 53. Library and Archives Canada, Ottawa, Canada — photo
- 54. Kildare Street and University Club, Dublin, Ireland — photo
- 55. Armagh Robinson Library, Armagh, Northern Ireland — photo
- 56. National Library of Ireland, Dublin, Ireland — photo
- 57. Cork City Library, Cork, Ireland — photo
- 58. City Library, Heritage Services, Newcastle upon Tyne, England — photo
- 59. Waterford City Library, Waterford, Ireland — photo
- 60. The Bar of Ireland, Law Library, Dublin, Ireland — photo
- To be continued

== See also ==
- World War I casualties

== Bibliography ==
- Committee of the Irish National War Memorial (1923). Ireland's Memorial Records, 1914–1918: being the names of Irishmen who fell in the Great European War, 1914–1918. Vol. 8. Dublin: Maunsel and Roberts.
- Helmers, Marguerite (2015). Harry Clarke's War: Illustrations for Ireland's Memorial Records, 1914–1918. Kildare, Ireland: Irish Academic Press. ISBN 9780716533085.
- The Irish National War Memorial Gardens Conservation Management Plan (PDF). Dublin, Ireland: Office of Public Works. 2018.
- Devlamynck, Francis (2014). "Ireland's Memorial Records 1914–1918 en de link tussen Ierland en het Sint-Antonius-gesticht in Loker". Shrapnel (1). Kuurne: The Western Front Association Belgium: 35–45.
- Ireland's Memorial Records, 1914–1918. The Irish Times. 16 November 1923.
- Irish War Memorial Committee archives. Dublin, Ireland: held by Royal Dublin Fusiliers Association.
- Ireland's Memorial Records: World War I, 1914–1918 (CD-ROM edition) (CD-ROM). Dublin: Eneclann. 1995. ISBN 1-905118-01-5.
- Committee of the Irish National War Memorial, ed. (2003). Ireland's Memorial Records, 1914–1918: Being the Names of Irishmen Who Fell in the Great European War, 1914–1918 -Facsimile of the original 1923 edition. Vol. 8. Uckfield: Naval & Military Press. ISBN 978-1-84342-584-7.
- O'Hanlon, Oliver (24 September 2023). "The Names List and Ireland's Memorial Records of the First World War". The Irish Times.
- Devlamynck, Francis. "Ireland's Memorial Records, 1914-1918". Yearbook 2015. Ypres: In Flanders Fields Museum: 85–122.
- Devlamynck, Francis (2021). "Ireland's Memorial Records, 1914-1918" (PDF). Distant Thunder, The Journal of the Irish Branches of The Western Front Association (6): 40–57.
- "Irish War Memorial Records". Google Arts & Culture. In Flanders Fields Museum.
- "Ireland's Memorial Records". Ulster Historical Foundation. Ulster Historical Foundation.
- "Ireland's Great War Dead". Ireland's Great War Dead.
