= DLR Lexicon =

Library in Dún Laoghaire, south-Dublin, Ireland

Coordinates: 53.2930°N 6.1321°W

The building

DLR Lexicon, branded as dlr LexIcon, is a building in Dún Laoghaire, Ireland, housing the main public library and cultural centre of Dún Laoghaire–Rathdown County Council (DLR CC). Whilst initially attracting controversy during construction, with some commentators concerned with its scale and its €36.6m cost at a time of austerity in Ireland, though with many recognising the potential of its interior, usability, and environmentally responsible construction, the innovative design has in large part contributed to it becoming the most popular library in all of Ireland.

== Construction ==
The 2004-10 DLR CC development plan included a new library and cultural centre as part of its urban regeneration scheme. It stated:

The need for specialised and centralised services in a Europe of the Regions setting will be promoted through the development of a Europe of the Regions Centre of Literature and Culture, which will be both a local and European focal point for literature, culture, and related co-operative activity.

The site chosen was Moran Park, a partially derelict public park with bowling green, running perpendicular to the coastline down an escarpment. The site was chosen because it was already owned by DLR CC and would link The Metals (Queens Road) on the busy seafront to the north with George's Street, Dún Laoghaire's main shopping street, to the south. Carr Cotter & Naessens, with a design by David Naessens, won the architecture competition in November 2007. In May 2009 DLR CC launched the public consultation required under Part 8 of the Planning & Development Regulations; a special development review meeting in November 2009 approved the plan by 22 votes to 3, rejecting Richard Boyd Barrett's proposal to locate the library on Carlisle Pier. Sisk Group won the request for tender and began construction in April 2012. Thirteen 40-tonne concrete rafters constructed in County Offaly were each brought on site in a single night. The building was opened to the public for preview on Culture Night (19 September 2014) and Open House Dublin (19 October 2014) and opened for general use on 8 December 2014. The building won the 2014 Royal Institute of the Architects of Ireland award categories Best Culture and Best Public Building.

== Facilities ==
DLR Lexicon is structured in vertical layers, from a staff basement to a peak 29 metres above street level. It includes adult, children's, and audiovisual lending libraries with 24-hour automated teller machines for returns; general and local history reference libraries; archives, and library administration offices. There are large open spaces, smaller reading rooms, meeting rooms, an art gallery and workshop, and a performance space and auditorium. A Brambles Café concession on the lower level opens onto a terrace in Moran Park.

== See also ==
- List of tourist attractions in Ireland
