= ALONE =

Elderly care charity in Ireland

- Abbreviation: ALONE
- Formation: 1977
- Legal status: Charity
- Purpose: Support of vulnerable older people
- Location: Ireland
- Region served: Ireland
- CEO: Sean Moynihan
- Website: https://www.alone.ie

ALONE is a charity organization in Ireland which was set-up to highlight the issues facing older people living alone. Founded in 1977 by Willie Bermingham, the charity seeks to help elderly people living on their own who may feel isolated and lonely, and to "connect [them] with the necessary support services in their community". The name ALONE in an acronym of the words "A Little Offering Never Ends".

ALONE states that it "works with the 1 in 5 older people who are homeless, socially isolated, living in deprivation or in crisis". The charity provides supportive housing, "befriending" services, community response and campaigning services to older people.

Within Glasnevin Cemetery, the Alone Millenium Plot is used by the charity to bury older people who died without family or other provisions for burial. In 2017 Alone celebrated its 40-year anniversary.

== History ==
In 1976, during a very cold spell that spanned a number of weeks, 8 older people were found dead in their Dublin homes.

Willie Bermingham (1942–90) – a Dublin fireman who discovered the remains of some of these people – and a number of his friends, distributed posters to highlight that a section of over-60s in Dublin were suffering cold, hunger, loneliness, depression and illness and dying alone. These volunteers began to collect and distribute donations of food, fuel, clothing and furniture. They initiated a "search that building" campaign and sought to draw attention to the conditions in which some older people lived, in derelict city-centre buildings.

ALONE's first housing complex was built in 1986 ("ALONE Walk" in Artane) and the second ("Willie Bermingham Place" in Kilmainham) was opened in 1990. Including these purpose built units, by the early 21st century, ALONE owned and maintained approximately 100 homes for elderly residents.

== Today ==
2013 saw demand of ALONEs services triple over previous years.

In August 2014, a charity single in aid of ALONE was released by Dublin Labour councillor Dermot Lacey. The song The Ballad of Rosie Hackett was written by Lacey to commemorate the opening of the Rosie Hackett Bridge.

In 2014 and 2016, ALONE campaigns focused on the length of waiting lists for nursing home places, and on the effects of austerity on older people.

In 2017, ALONE celebrated its 40th anniversary and a book was launched to document its history.
