= Rosie Hackett Bridge =

Bridge over the River Liffey in Ireland

Rosie Hackett Bridge Droichead Róise Haicéid
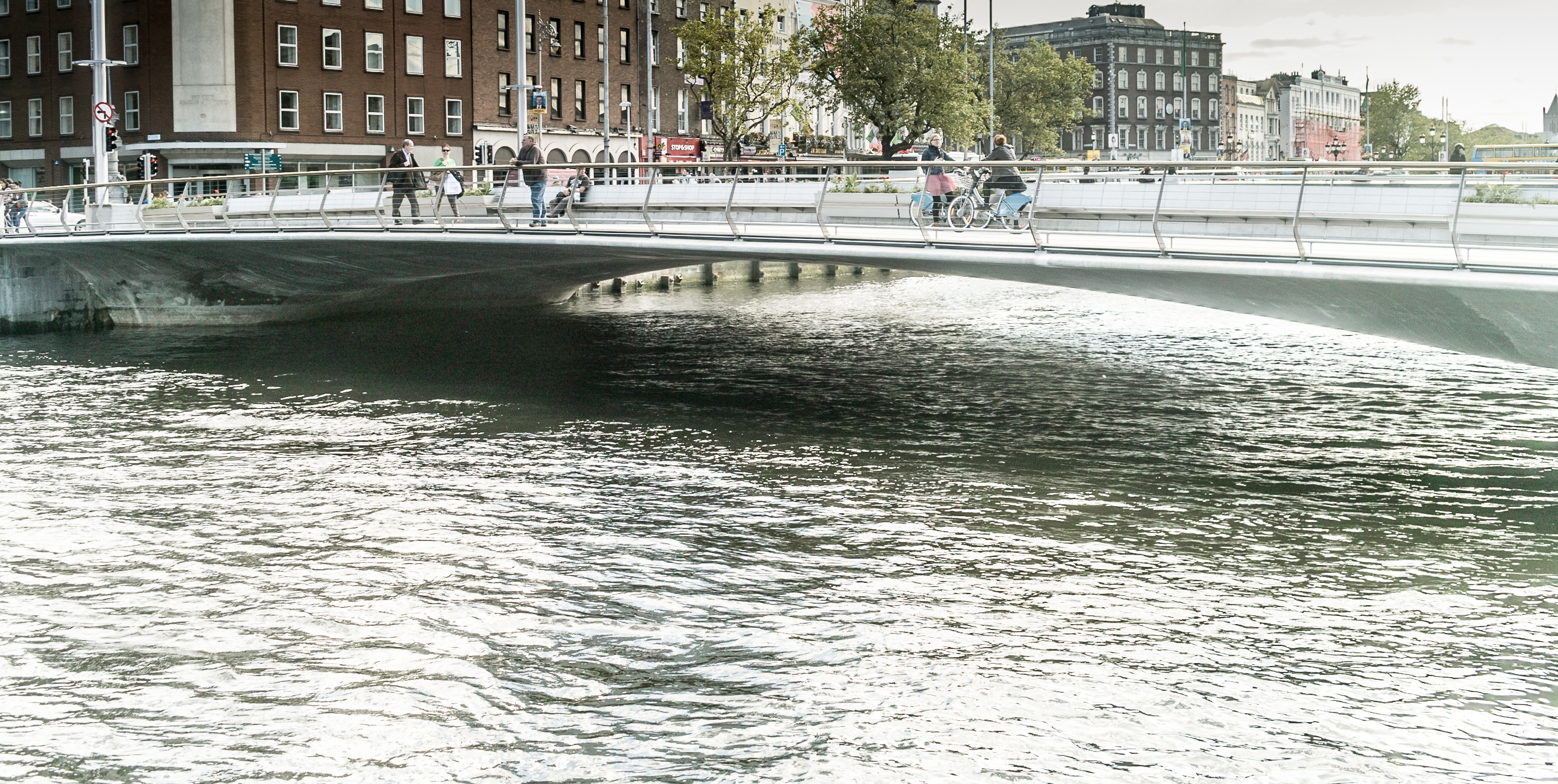
- The bridge, with pedestrians, in 2018
- Coordinates: 53.348°N 6.257°W
- Crosses: River Liffey
- Locale: Dublin, Ireland
- Named for: Rosie Hackett, an Irish trade union leader known for being co-founder of the Irish Women Workers' Union
- Preceded by: O'Connell Bridge
- Followed by: Butt Bridge

Characteristics
- Total length: 48 metres (157 ft)
- Width: 26 metres (85 ft)
- No. of spans: Single span

History
- Construction start: 2011
- Construction end: 20 May 2014

Location
- Interactive map of Rosie Hackett Bridge

The Rosie Hackett Bridge (Irish: Droichead Róise Haicéid) is a road and tram bridge in Dublin, Ireland, which opened on 20 May 2014. Spanning the River Liffey and joining Marlborough Street to Hawkins Street, it is used solely by public transport, taxis, cyclists and pedestrians. It is 26 metres wide and 48 metres long, and is a single span, smooth concrete structure, with the underside of the bridge designed to be as high above the water as possible so that river traffic is not impeded. It was built to carry the extended Luas Green line, and was budgeted at €15 million. It is named for trade unionist Rosie Hackett (1893–1976).

== Use ==
The bridge carries the Luas Green Line, which connects via an extension with the Luas Red Line, and opened in December 2017. The bridge is also used by other public transport services, including Dublin Bus routes 14, 15, 27, 27x, 33x, 33d, 44, 61, 142 and 151, certain Bus Éireann services, taxis, bicycles and motorbikes.

== Planning and construction ==
The bridge was proposed by Dublin City Council to carry the southbound line of the Luas Green line, to allow for the reorganisation of certain Dublin Bus routes, and to ease congestion by providing additional capacity for buses and taxis crossing the Liffey.

Commentators argued that, being just 90 metres downstream from the very wide O'Connell Bridge, the new bridge could not bring many benefits, and any benefit would be cancelled out by the negative impact on the city's classical Georgian urban plan - especially to the symmetry of spacing between existing Liffey bridges. Ultimately, following an environmental impact assessment and Bord Pleanála approval in 2009, the project was approved without any changes to the planned location.

Roughan and O'Donovan Consulting Engineers and Sean Harrington Architects were appointed by Dublin City Council to design and plan the bridge, and Graham Construction (who also constructed the Samuel Beckett Bridge) were awarded the construction contract. Preparatory works commenced in late 2011, with bridge construction beginning in early 2012. The bridge was officially opened on 20 May 2014, with Luas services officially commencing on 9 December 2017.

== Name ==
In its planning and construction phases, the bridge was designated by the working name of the Marlborough Street Public Transport Priority Bridge. Dublin City Council invited nominations from the public for the bridge's final name. Ten nominations were referred to the council's naming committee, which used a Borda count to shortlist five names for a plenary meeting of the council, where another Borda count on 2 September 2013 chose to name it after Rosie Hackett, a trade unionist and republican revolutionary. Hackett had been nominated by three women members of Labour Youth. The other four shortlisted were Willie Bermingham, Frank Duff, Kathleen Mills, and Bram Stoker. The De Borda Institute asserted that the name selection process was the first time an Irish elected chamber used a non-majoritarian decision-making methodology.

Some media reports characterised it as the first Liffey bridge named after a woman, though other bridges used to be. (Note: Mellows Bridge had been Queen's Bridge after Queen Charlotte of Mecklenburg-Strelitz, and later Queen Maeve's Bridge; Island Bridge had been Sarah Bridge after Sarah Fane, Countess of Westmorland; Rory O'More Bridge had been Victoria and Albert Bridge. Additionally, Anna Livia Bridge is named after a female personification of the River Liffey;)
