= Dublin Gas Company Building =

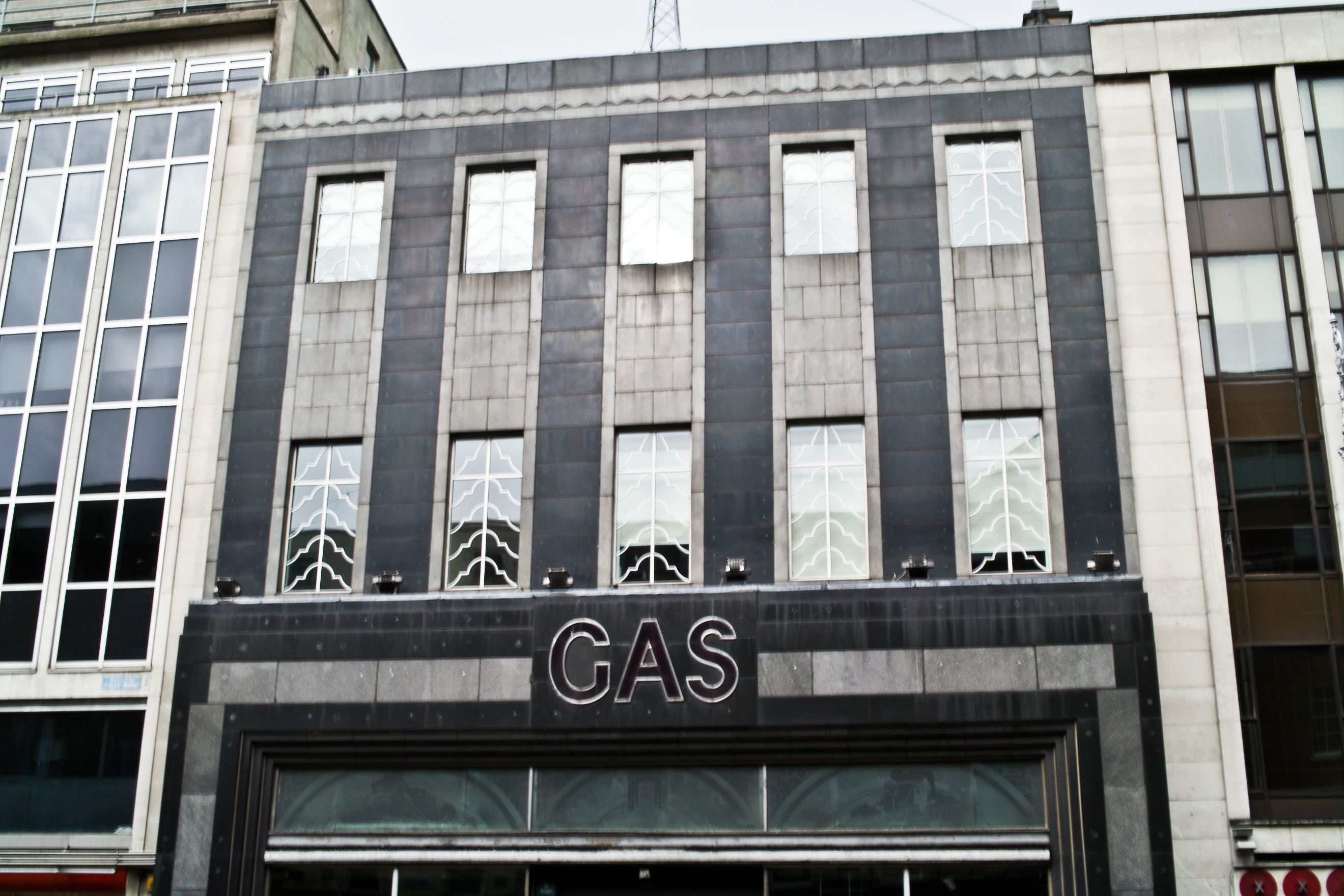
- Part of the building's facade in 2010

- Location within Central Dublin

General information
- Type: Headquarters
- Architectural style: Art Deco
- Location: 24 D'Olier Street, Dublin, D02 T283
- Coordinates: 53.3467137°N 6.257854°W
- Current tenants: Trinity College Dublin School of Midwifery
- Construction started: 1931
- Completed: 1934
- Client: Dublin Gas Company

Design and construction
- Architects: Robinson & Keefe

The Dublin Gas Company Building, more recently known as the School of Nursing and Midwifery, is an Art Deco building on D'Olier Street in Dublin. It was originally the headquarters for the Dublin Gas Company and more recently became the School of Nursing and Midwifery at Trinity College Dublin.

== Design ==
The headquarters of the Dublin Gas Company was designed and overseen by architects Robinson & Keefe between 1931 and 1934. It has frontages onto D'Olier Street, Leinster Market, and Hawkins Street. It was completed in several phases. The first phase of construction dates from 1818. Today, the building is considered one of the finest public buildings of the interwar period in Dublin. Its D'Olier Street facade and Hawkins Street facade are entirely different, stylistically. D'Olier Street is Art Deco whereas Hawkins Street has Neo-Tudor elements.

Ireland's National Inventory of Architectural Heritage describes the structure as incorporating unique elements such as "plain geometric facade, the Egyptian Revival themed foyer and the more subtle curves of stair well and stepped coving in the auditorium". The building once contained a cinema.

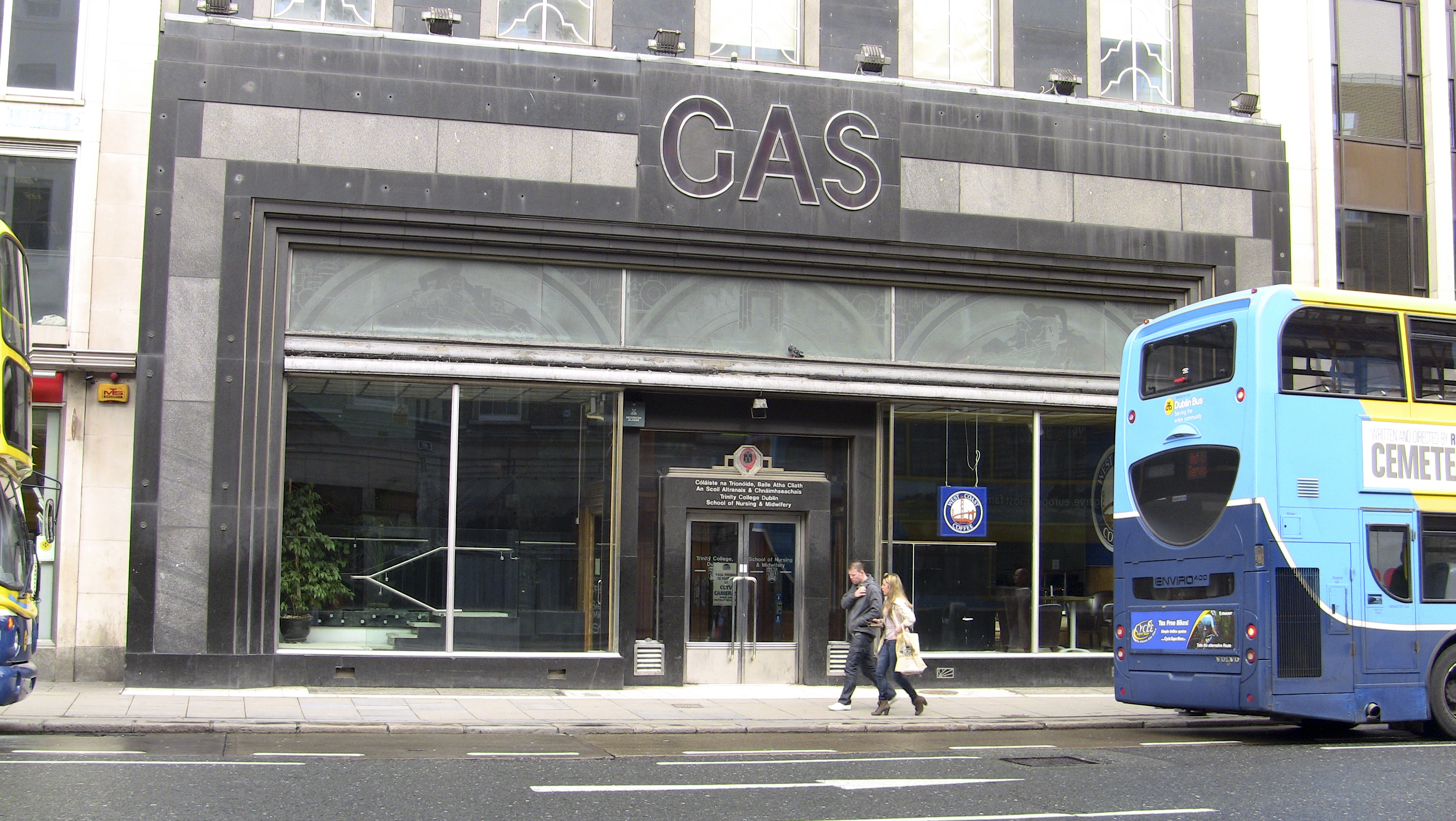
The entrance to the building on D'Olier Street

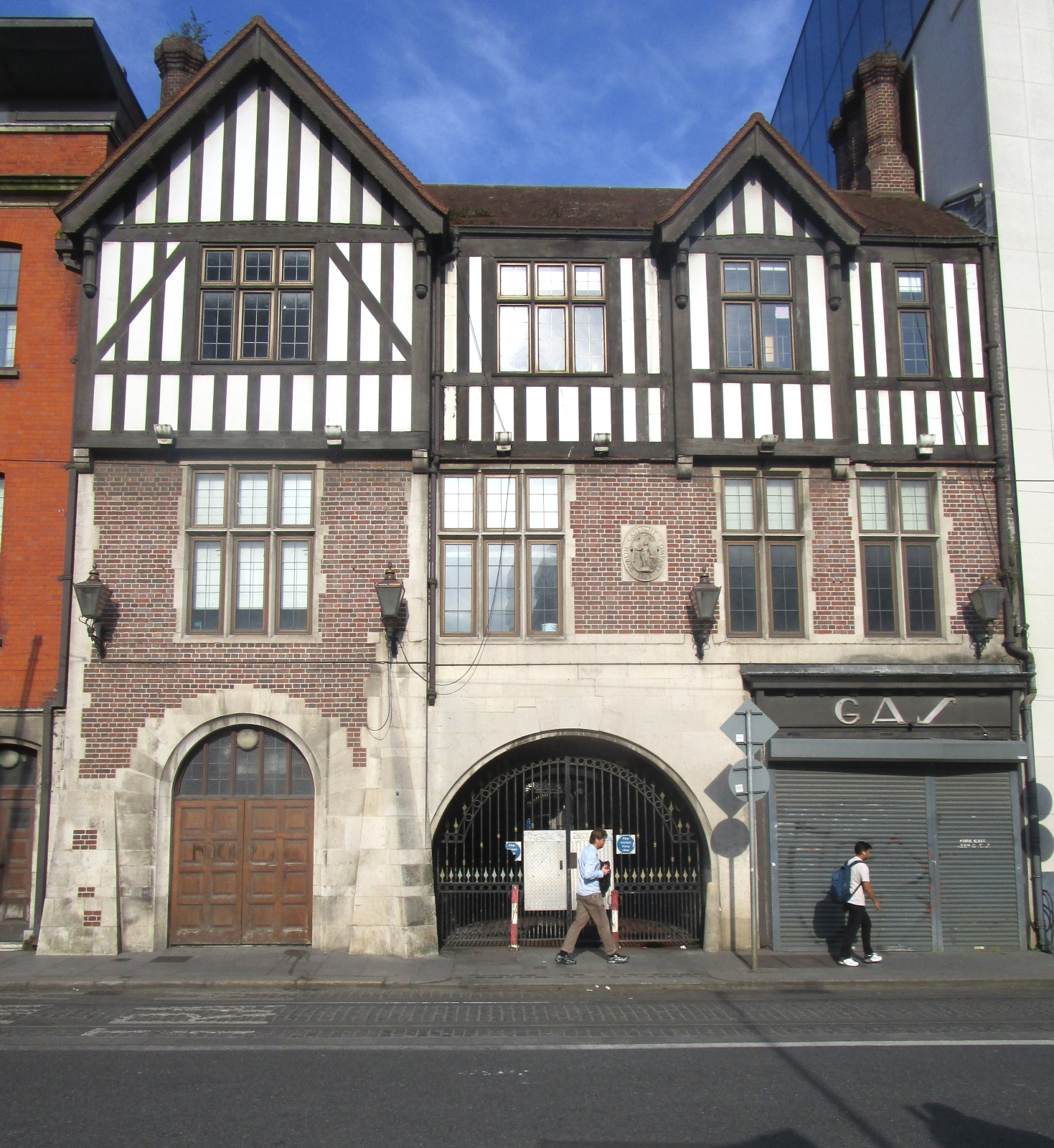
Rear entrance on Hawkins Street
