= Rosie Hackett =

Irish trade unionist

- Born: Rosanna Hackett; 25 July 1893; Dublin, Ireland
- Died: 4 May 1976 (aged 83); Dublin, Ireland
- Occupations: Messenger, printer, cooperative organiser

Rosanna "Rosie" Hackett (25 July 1893 – 4 May 1976) was an Irish revolutionary and trade union leader. She was a founder-member of the Irish Women Workers' Union, and supported strikers during the 1913 Dublin Lockout. She later became a member of the Irish Citizen Army and was involved in the 1916 Easter Rising. In the 1970s, the Irish Transport and General Workers' Union awarded Hackett a gold medal for decades of service, and in 2014 a Dublin city bridge was named in her memory.

== Early and personal life ==
Rosie Hackett was born into a working-class family in Dublin in 1893. Her father was John Hackett, a hairdresser, whilst her mother was Roseanna Dunne. According to the 1901 census, she was living with her widowed mother and five other family members in a tenement building on Bolton Street in the city centre. The available documents suggest that her father died when she was still very young. Hackett joined the Irish Transport and General Workers' Union (ITGWU) when it was established in 1909 by Jim Larkin, which marked the beginning of her lifelong activity in trade unionism. By 1911 she was living with her family in a cottage on Old Abbey Street, and her mother had remarried to Patrick Gray. That same year she co-founded the Irish Women Workers' Union (IWWU) with Delia Larkin. Hackett never married and lived in Fairview with her brother Tommy until her death in 1976.

== Career ==
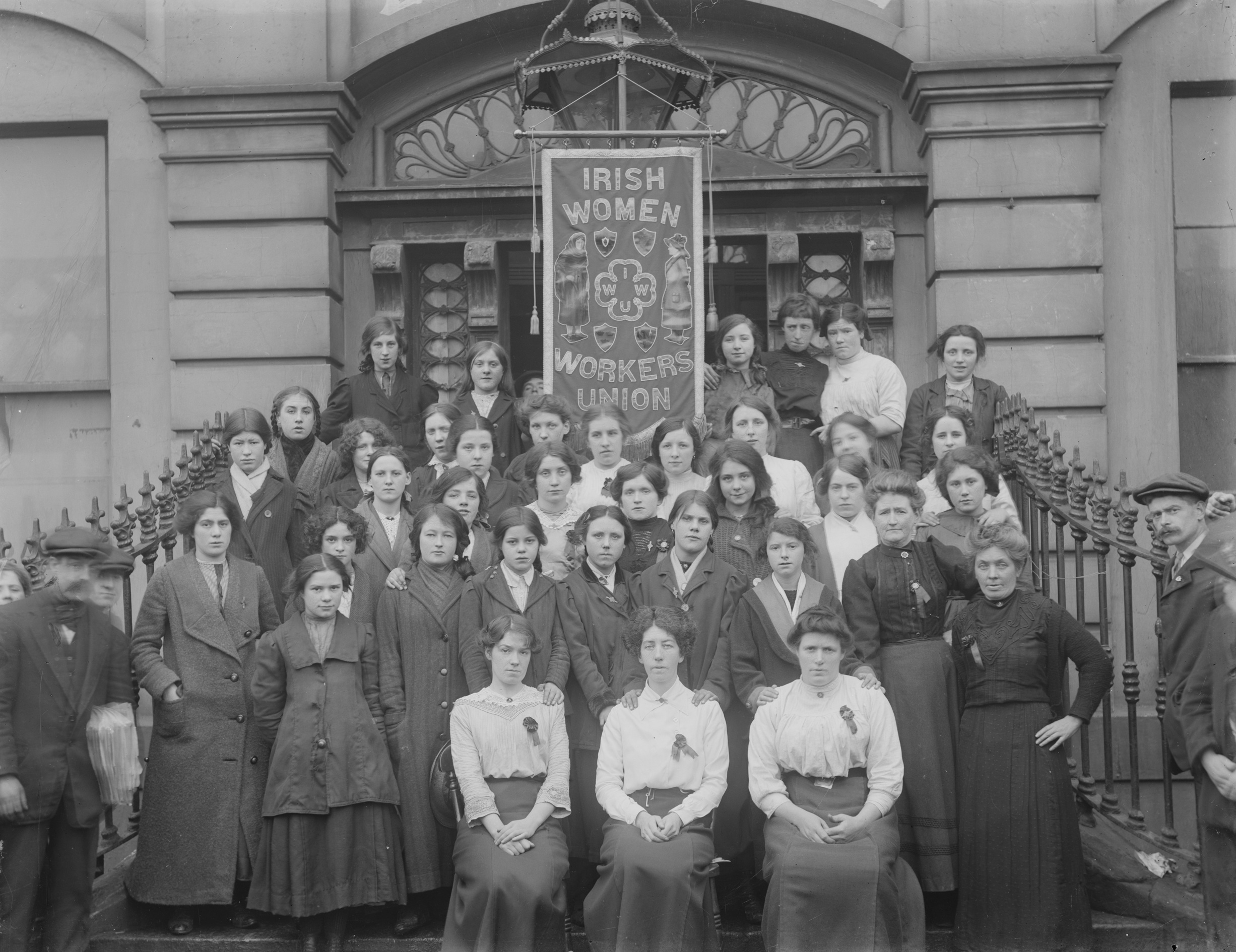
Members of the Irish Women Workers Union on the steps of Liberty Hall (5865483241)

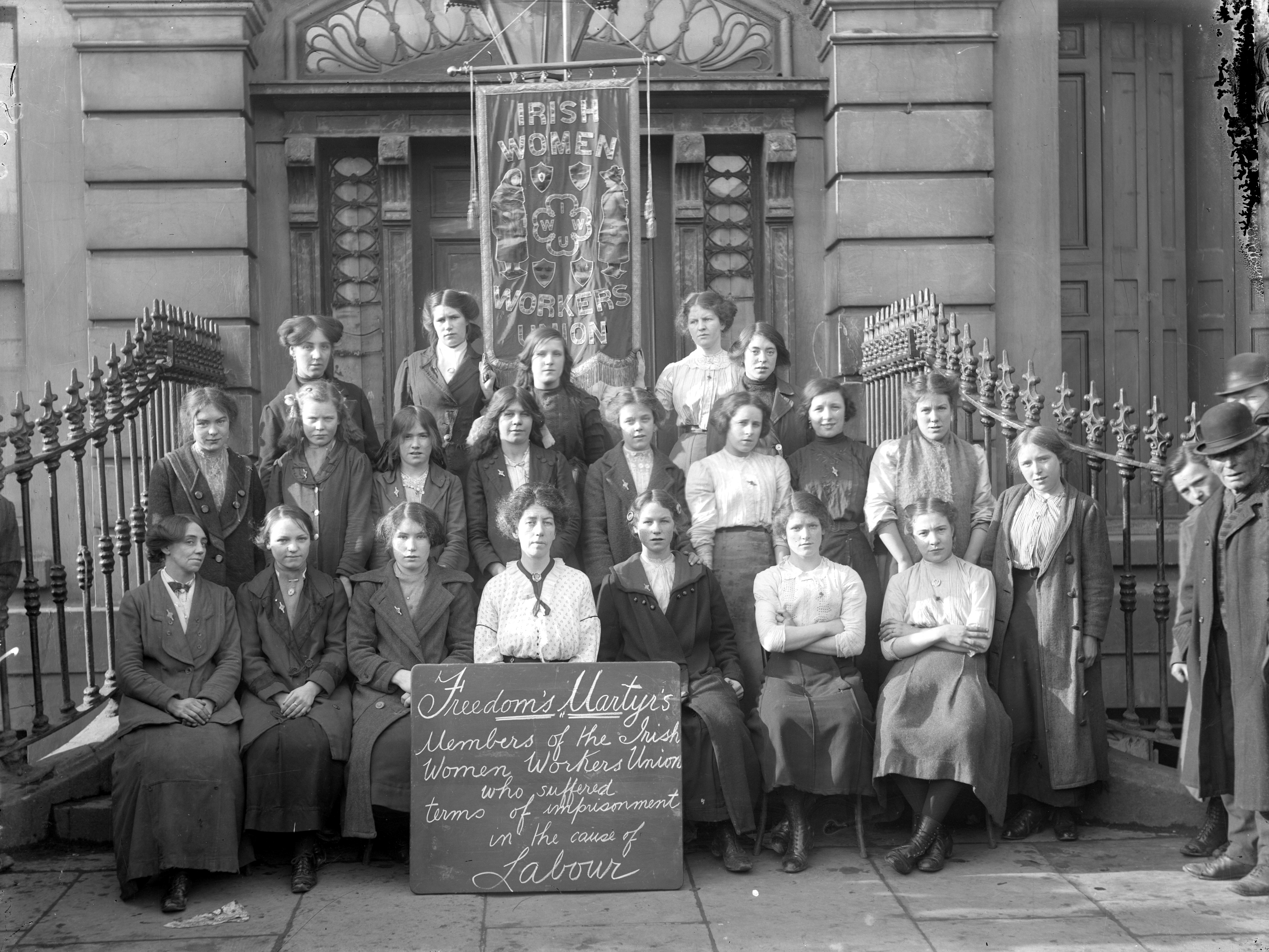
Freedom martyrs

Rosie Hackett fought for many decades for the rights of workers. Through her affiliation and work with the Irish Transport and General Workers Union (ITGWU), the Irish Women Worker's Union (IWWU) and the Irish Citizen Army, she helped carve out and secure modern-day working conditions. Hackett's career began as a packer in a paper store, she then became a messenger for Jacob's biscuits. At that time the working conditions in the factory were poor.

=== Irish labour movement (1911–14) ===
On 22 August 1911 Hackett helped organise the withdrawal of women's labour in Jacob's factory to support their male colleagues who were already on strike. With the women's help, the men secured better working conditions and a pay rise. Two weeks later, at the age of eighteen, Hackett co-founded the Irish Women Worker's Union (IWWU) with Delia Larkin. During the 1913 Lockout Hackett helped mobilise the Jacob's workers to come out in solidarity with other workers, they, in turn, were locked out by their own employers. This did not stop Rosie Hackett's work to help others, and she along with several of her IWWU colleagues set up soup kitchens in Liberty Hall to help feed the strikers. However, in 1914 her Jacob's employers sacked her over her role in the Lockout.

=== Easter Rising 1916 ===
Hackett began work as a clerk in the printshop in Liberty Hall, and it was here she became involved with the Irish Citizen Army. Hackett was involved in preparations for the 1916 Rising, working in a union shop, helping with printers, and making first-aid kits and knap-sacks.

Irish Republic Flag

If other members of the ITGWU were looking for James Connolly, she aided in bringing them to him. Hackett "worked as canvasser and traveller and was called on to carry out many confidential jobs".

She took up first aid training provided by Dr. Kathleen Lynn for six months before the rising and attended night marches organised by the Irish Citizen Army. According to her own account, Hackett said "A week before Easter, I took part in the ceremony of hoisting the challenge flag over Hall". Like other girls and women who were involved in the Rising, she carried messages and guns, and prepared uniforms and food for Irish Republican Army members "and sometimes risky work".

Three weeks before the Easter Rising, the Royal Irish Constabulary raided a shop where Hackett was working. She was alone when they came and they were looking for a copy of "Gael". She said to them "wait till I get the head" and she called for Connolly. The police were stopped by Connolly and Helena Molony who were armed, and Hackett immediately hid everything, so that when the police came back they could not get anything. Because of that event, the police knew that they were armed and they had to double up work, so Rosie was in Liberty Hall all the time.

=== 1916 Proclamation ===
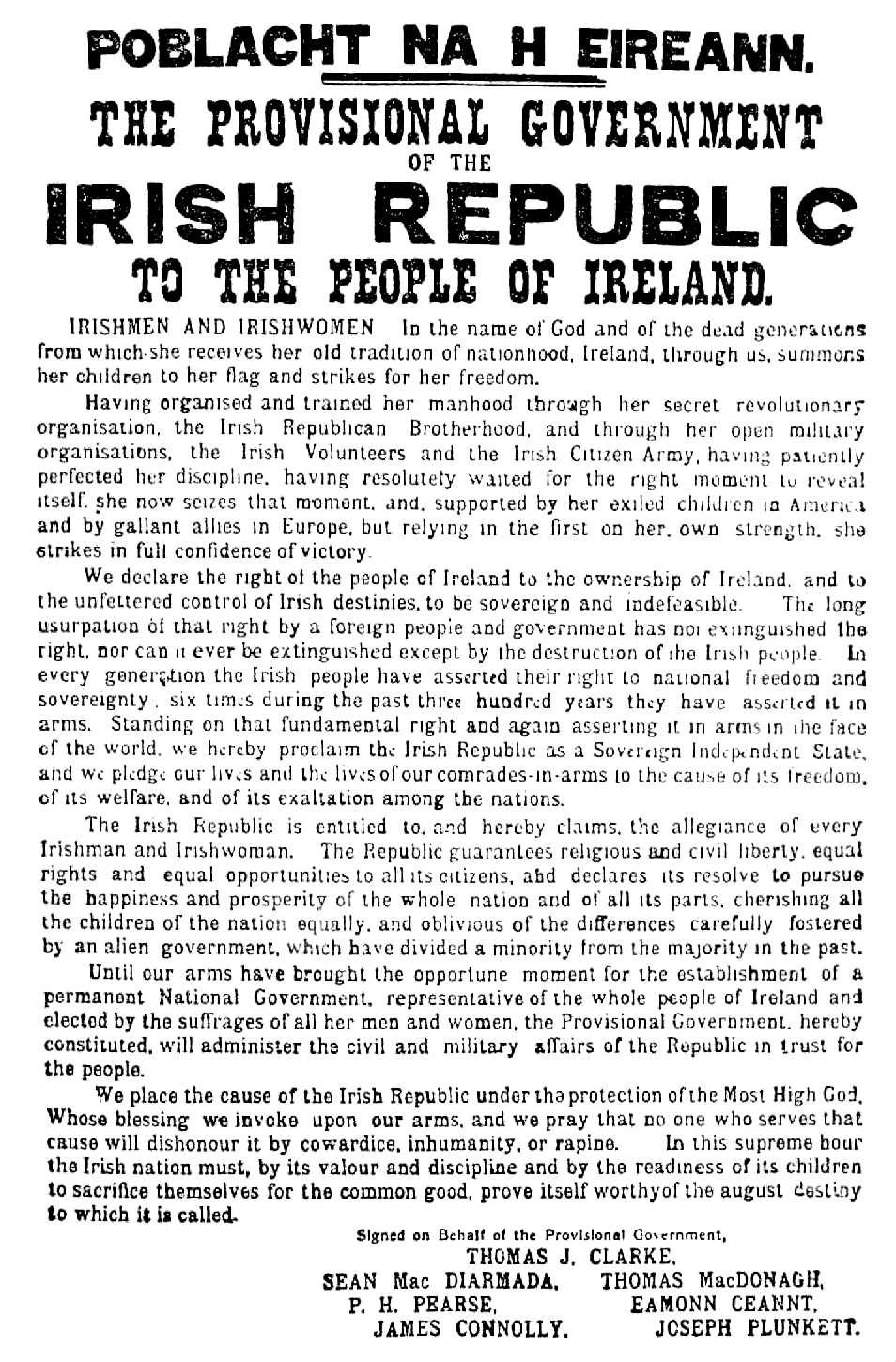
Easter Proclamation of 1916

Hackett was part of the group that printed the first proclamation. Through her experience of working in the printshop she helped to print the Proclamation of the Irish Republic. She was in the printing room in Liberty Hall as a trusted messenger in 1916 when the Proclamation was printed and it was the first time she was allowed in. However, she knew about their technical difficulties: “they hadn't much type, (...) the type was short and they had to patch it up a bit (...) and they worked at night". She remembers that three men were there when she entered the room and one came over to her, shook her hand and congratulated her. It made her very proud; especially that no one else was allowed to get in. She subsequently told family members of handing it still wet to James Connolly before it was read out by Padraic Pearse on the steps of the GPO.

=== Irish Citizen Army ===
Hackett was an active member of the Irish Citizen Army. On Easter Tuesday, under the command of Constance Markievicz, Hackett took part in the 1916 Rising and was located in the area of St Stephen's Green and the Royal College of Surgeons. This position was heavily attacked with guns, short of first-aid and "looked like a death trap". However, after moving from an initially overlooked position in Stephen's Green, it was one of the last positions to surrender. In the Royal College, Rosie Hackett as a first-aid practitioner was allowed entry to the lecture room sanctioned to the Red Cross only. Another first-aider, Aider Nora O'Daily, later reported that during those days: “I have a very kind remembrance of Little Rosie Hackett of the Citizen Army, always cheerful and always willing; to see her face about the place was a tonic itself”.

After surrendering, the rebels were taken to Dublin Castle. Hackett was imprisoned in Kilmainham Jail for ten days.

=== 1917 ===
Postcard of Liberty Hall with a banner reading "James Connolly Murdered May 12th 1916"

In 1917, on the anniversary of Connolly's death, Hackett together with Helena Molony, Jinny Shanahan and Brigid Davis printed and hung a poster detailing the anniversary, "James Connolly, Murdered May 12th, 1916". After the first poster displayed by the ITGWU members was taken down by the police, they worked to ensure that their poster would stay on Liberty Hall much longer – by staying on top of the roof to defend it. They barricaded the door using a ton of coal and nails on the windows. The poster was hanging there until 6 pm and thousands of people could see it. Hackett has reported that, "it took four hundred policemen to take four women" and only to avoid embarrassment in the public eye was the reason why they were not arrested. She described their revolutionist feelings about this action: “We enjoyed it at the time – all the trouble they were put to.”

=== Trade union worker (1917–1970) ===
After the Rising, Hackett returned to the IWWU which, at its strongest, organised over 70,000 women. After the 1945 laundry strike, they won an extra week of paid holidays for the workers. She attended many important labour union events such as the opening of the new Liberty Hall on 2 May 1965 and Arbour Hill memorial services. Until her retirement, she ran the trade union shops resulting in over 5 decades of active participation in the Irish trades union movement work to improve conditions for Irish workers. In 1970 she was awarded a gold medal for fifty years of ITGWU membership.

== Legacy ==
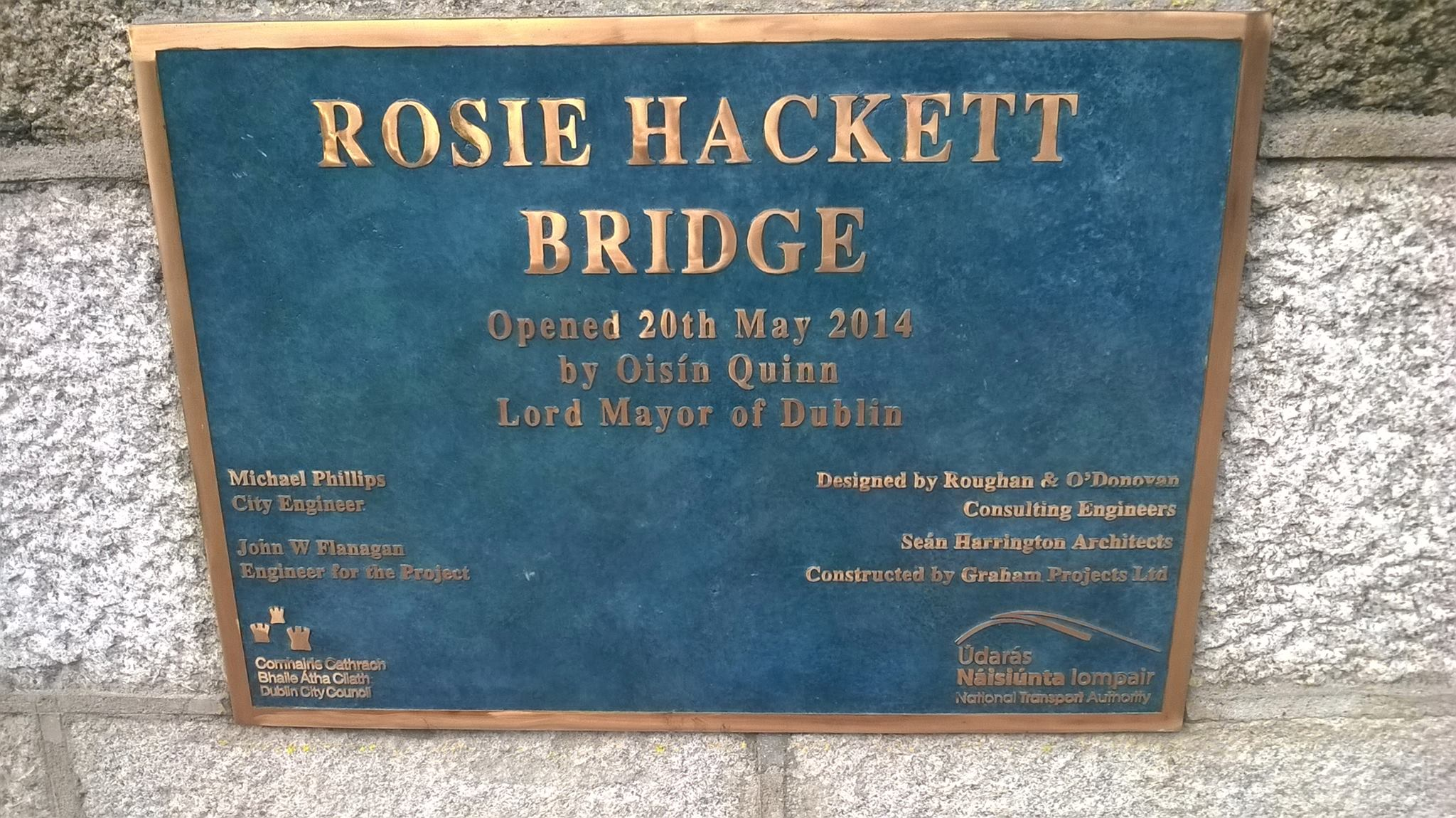
Plaque on Rosie Hackett Bridge September 2014

In the 1970s, Walter McFarlane (then branch secretary of the ITGWU) awarded an honorary badge for Hackett's sixty years contribution to the union.

Hackett was never married and lived in Fairview with her brother Tommy until her death in 1976. She was buried at St Paul's plot, in Glasnevin cemetery next to her mother Roseanna née Dunne and stepfather Patrick Gray. At her burial, she was honoured with a military salute and her coffin was covered with the Irish flag.

She died on 4 July 1976.

In May 2014, the Rosie Hackett Bridge was officially opened by the Lord Mayor of Dublin. The Hackett Bridge Campaign had begun in October 2012 – led by three women Angelina Cox (an active member of Labour Youth), Jeni Gartland and Lisa Connell. The final shortlist of contending names for the new bridge (and their awarded voting points) had been Rosie Hackett (192 points), Kay Mills (176), Willie Bermingham (167), Bram Stoker (92), Frank Duff (80 points).

Áine Uí Fhoghlú wrote a poem titled "Droichead", or 'bridge' in the Irish language, commemorating Rosie Hackett.

In April 2015 a plaque was unveiled on Foley Street by the North Inner City Folklore Project to commemorate the women of the Irish Citizen Army. The plaque lists Rosie Hackett as a member of the St.Stephens Green/College of Surgeons garrison during the 1916 Easter Rising.
