= Arthur Fields (photographer) =

Ukrainian-born Irish street photographer

Photo of Arthur Fields on O'Connell Street, Dublin, c. 1950

Arthur Fields (born Abraham Feldman; 1901–1994) was an Irish street photographer of Ukrainian descent. He took more than 180,000 photographs of pedestrians on the south end of Dublin's O'Connell Bridge, over more than 50 years.

== Background and career ==
Fields was born into a Ukrainian Jewish family. His family fled antisemitism in Kiev in 1885, and later settled in Dublin.

Fields originally ran a sound studio where people could make a recording of their own voice, but later began his photography when he bought a box camera. Fields switched to a Polaroid instant camera later in his career. Field's brother was also a photographer on the bridge. Fields' extensive photographs are recognised as a social record of Dublin from the 1930s to the 1980s, depicting the changing fashions and shopfronts of the city. Nelson's Pillar often featured in Field's photograph until its destruction by Irish republicans in 1966.

Fields took an estimated 182,500 photographs of pedestrians on the bridge from the early 1930s until 1985. Notable people photographed by Fields on the bridge included the playwright Brendan Behan, the actors Margaret Rutherford and Gene Tierney, and Prince Monolulu, who claimed to be a chief of the Falasha tribe of Abyssinia, and who wore a headdress and a fur coat.

Fields lived in the Dublin suburb of Raheny, and would walk seven miles to and from the bridge each day to work. Field's modus operandi would be to "pretend to take a picture of a passer-by and, when they stopped, he'd take the real one. Then he'd give them a ticket and they could collect the photograph from a nearby studio run by his wife; she developed all the photos."

== Legacy ==
Arthur Fields' work has been documented on the interactive documentary website, Man On Bridge: 50 Years as a Photographer on O’Connell Bridge produced by El Zorrero Films. The website encourages the public to submit their photographs to an online archive. The web project which features an image archive and documentary videos won best website at the Digital Media Awards in 2015. The Man on Bridge project was also a winner of the Arthur Guinness Projects. In December 2014 an exhibition of 3,400 photographs collected for the project was held at the Gallery of Photography in Dublin.

A documentary titled Man On Bridge was produced for RTE and screened at Christmas 2014. The Irish Times called the film a "beautifully constructed, subtly emotional documentary". The documentary was nominated for an IFTA award for Best Documentary Single in 2015.

Two books of Arthur Fields' photographs edited by Ciaran Deeney and David Clarke were published by Colins Press.

== Publications ==
- Man on the Bridge: The Photos of Arthur Fields - ISBN 978-1848893320
- Man on the Bridge: More Photos By Arthur Fields - ISBN 978-1848892170
