= Hawkins Street =

Street in Dublin, Ireland

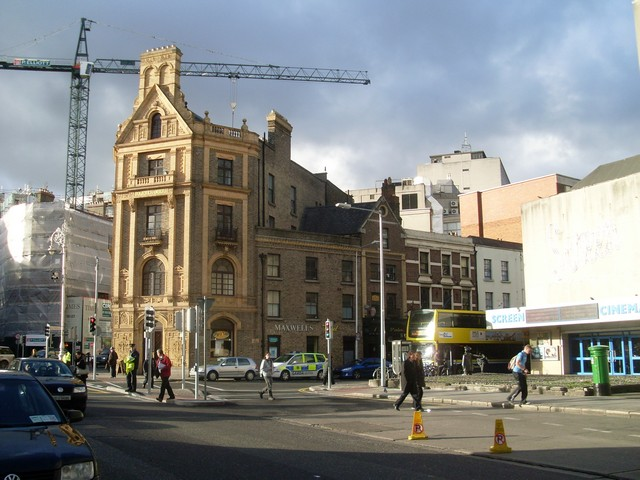
- Hawkins Street as seen from Townsend Street

- Location within Central Dublin
- Native name: Sráid Hawkins (Irish)
- Namesake: William Hawkins (c. 1618–1680)
- Length: 160 m (520 ft)
- Location: Dublin, Ireland
- Postal code: D02
- Coordinates: 53.346231°N 6.257052°W
- North: Burgh Quay/ Rosie Hackett Bridge
- South: Townsend Street

Hawkins Street (Irish: Sráid Hawkins) is a street in central Dublin, Ireland. It runs south from Rosie Hackett Bridge, at its junction with Burgh Quay, for 160 metres (170 yd) to a crossroads with Townsend Street, where it continues as College Street.

== History ==
The area around Hawkins Street was inhabited since at least the late 16th century, while the general area of Dublin had been fully reclaimed from the banks of the River Liffey by 1673. George Burroughs is recorded as opening one of the first brick manufactories in Dublin near the site in 1599 although the street is not yet set out at the time of John Speed's Map of Dublin (1610). The street is named for William Hawkins (c. 1618–1680), an Alderman of Dublin who had been the driving force behind the reclamation, funding 450 metres of walling himself.

In the medieval period, this area had a leprosy hospital.

The Dublin Intelligence first references the street in 1723 before the street is marked on Charles Brooking's map of Dublin (1728).

Many of the buildings on the west side of the street were built on former back gardens when D'Olier Street was widened as part of the Wide Streets Commission works in the late 18th and early 19th century.

In the second half of the 20th century, the street became known as an office district, with the eponymous Hawkins House constructed on the site of the former Theatre Royal from 1962-64.

== Notable buildings ==
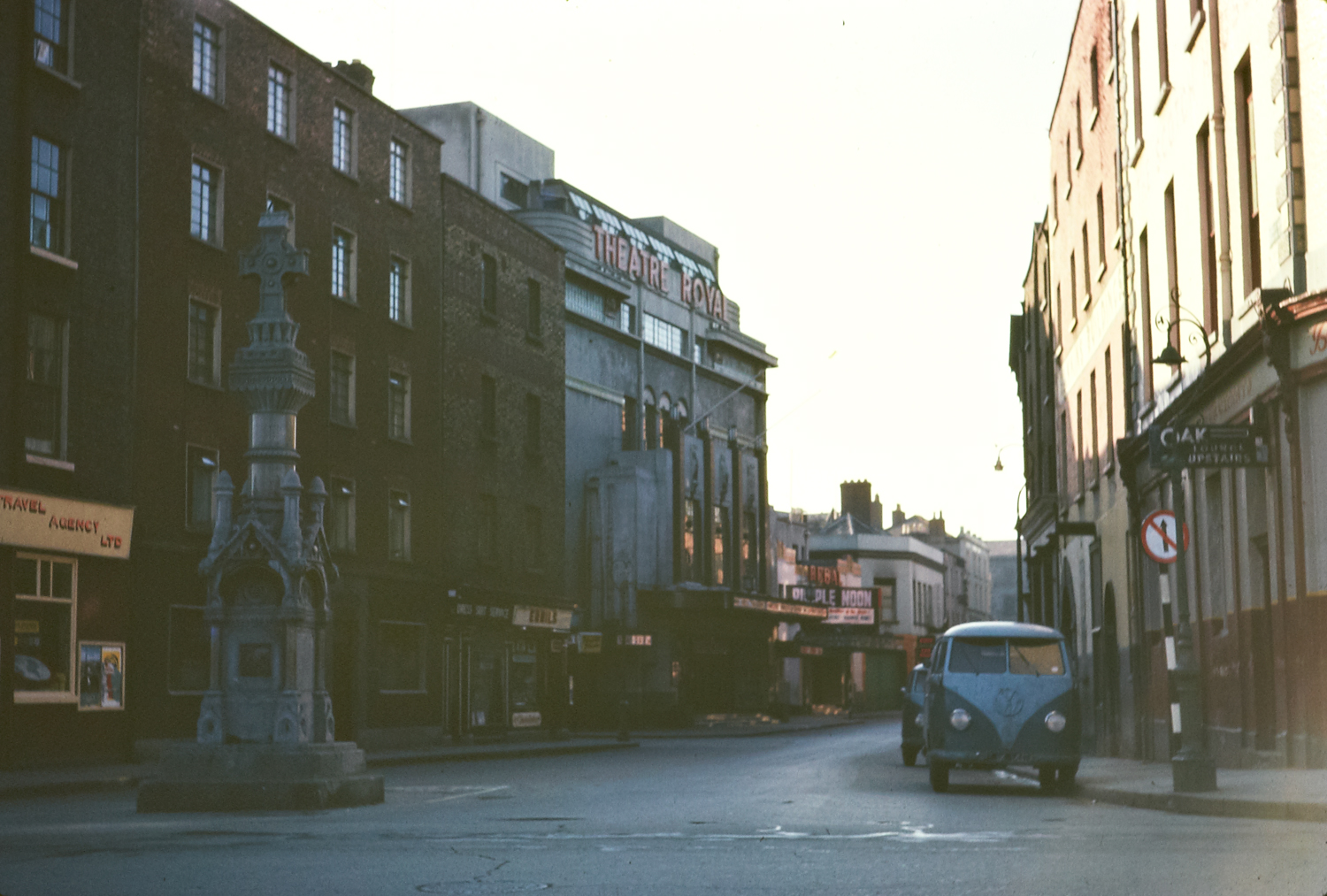
Hawkins Street in the 1960s, looking south from the quays, with the Sheahan Memorial on the left, in its former location

The Dublin Society (later the Royal Dublin Society) had its house on the street from 1796 after moving from nearby Grafton Street. The society moved to Leinster House in 1815, and the building was demolished and replaced with the Theatre Royal in 1820.

There have been five Theatres Royal in Dublin's history, two of them in Hawkins Street. The third Theatre Royal was opened in the street in 1820. It burned to the ground in 1880. The fifth Theatre Royal opened in 1935. In 1962, this was demolished to make way for a large office block development, Hawkins House and the Screen Cinema. Permission to demolish these buildings was granted in 2017.

The rear entrance of the Dublin Gas Company Building, built in 1928, is also on the western side of the street. This building, designed by Charles Herbert Ashworth is in the Arts and Crafts and English Tudor styles, in stark contrast to the art deco facade on D'Olier Street. The buildings are built to accommodate the laneway, Leinster Market.

=== Sheahan Memorial ===
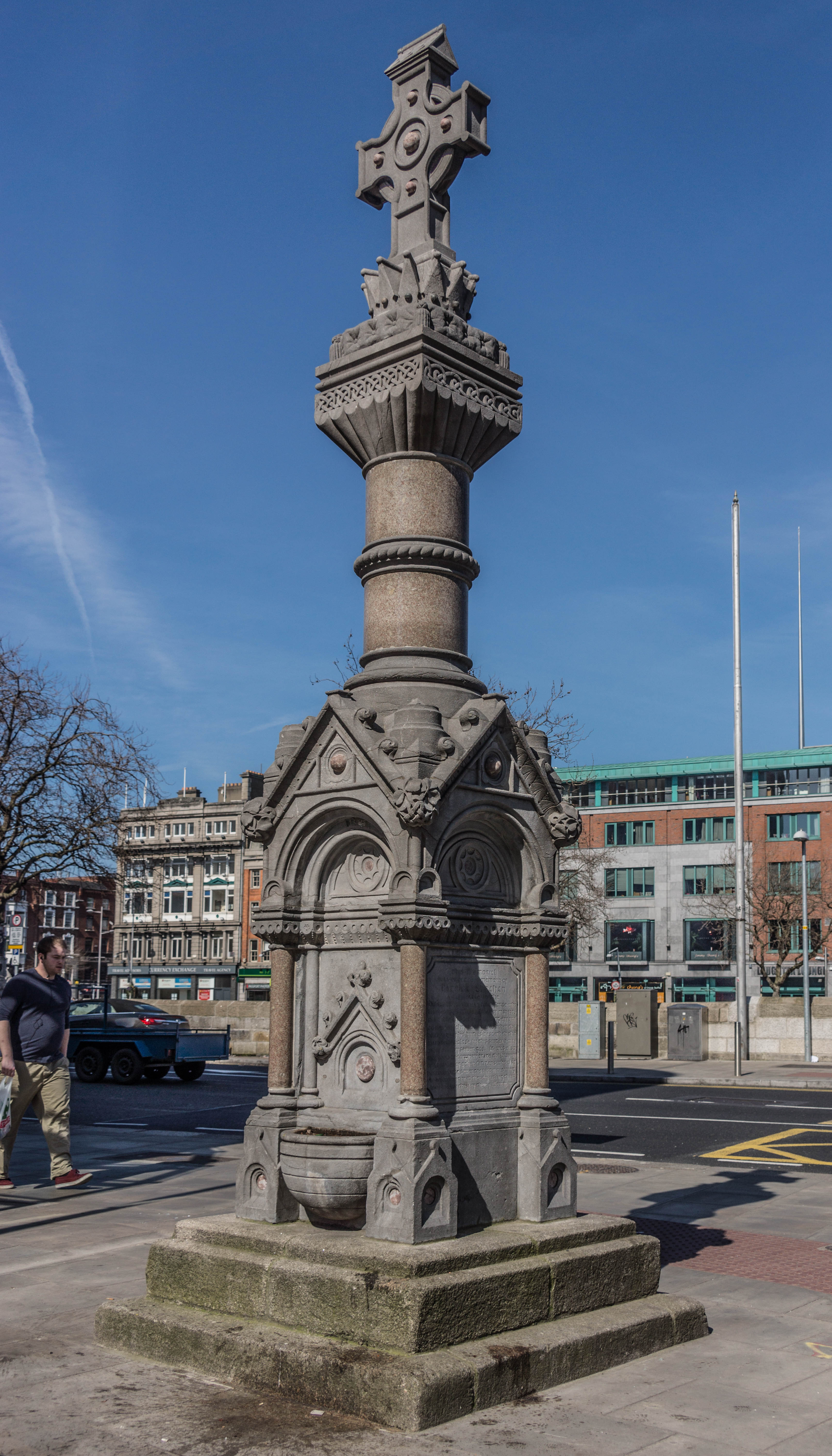
Sheahan Memorial, at the junction with Burgh Quay, in its new location

At the northern end of the street stands the Sheahan Memorial from 1906, which commemorates the place where a member of the Dublin Metropolitan Police, Constable Patrick Sheahan, died on duty. The memorial was designed by W. P. O'Neill, built by Harrison & Sons, and was moved to the side of the street in 2012. Its inscription reads, in English and Irish:

This memorial was erected in memory of Patrick Sheahan a constable in the Dublin Metropolitan Police Force who lost his life in the 6th day of March 1905 in a noble and self-sacrificing effort to rescue John Fleming who had in the discharge of his duties descended the main sewer close by this spot and was overcome by sewer gas. It was also intended to commemorate the bravery of a number of other citizens who also descended the sewer to assist in rescuing the beforementioned, thereby risking their lives to save those of their fellow men

The event was commemorated in the song "The Burgh Quay Sad Calamity".

== See also ==
- List of streets and squares in Dublin
