= Ship Street Barracks =

Barracks building in Dublin, Ireland

- Dún Shráid na Loinge
- Dublin
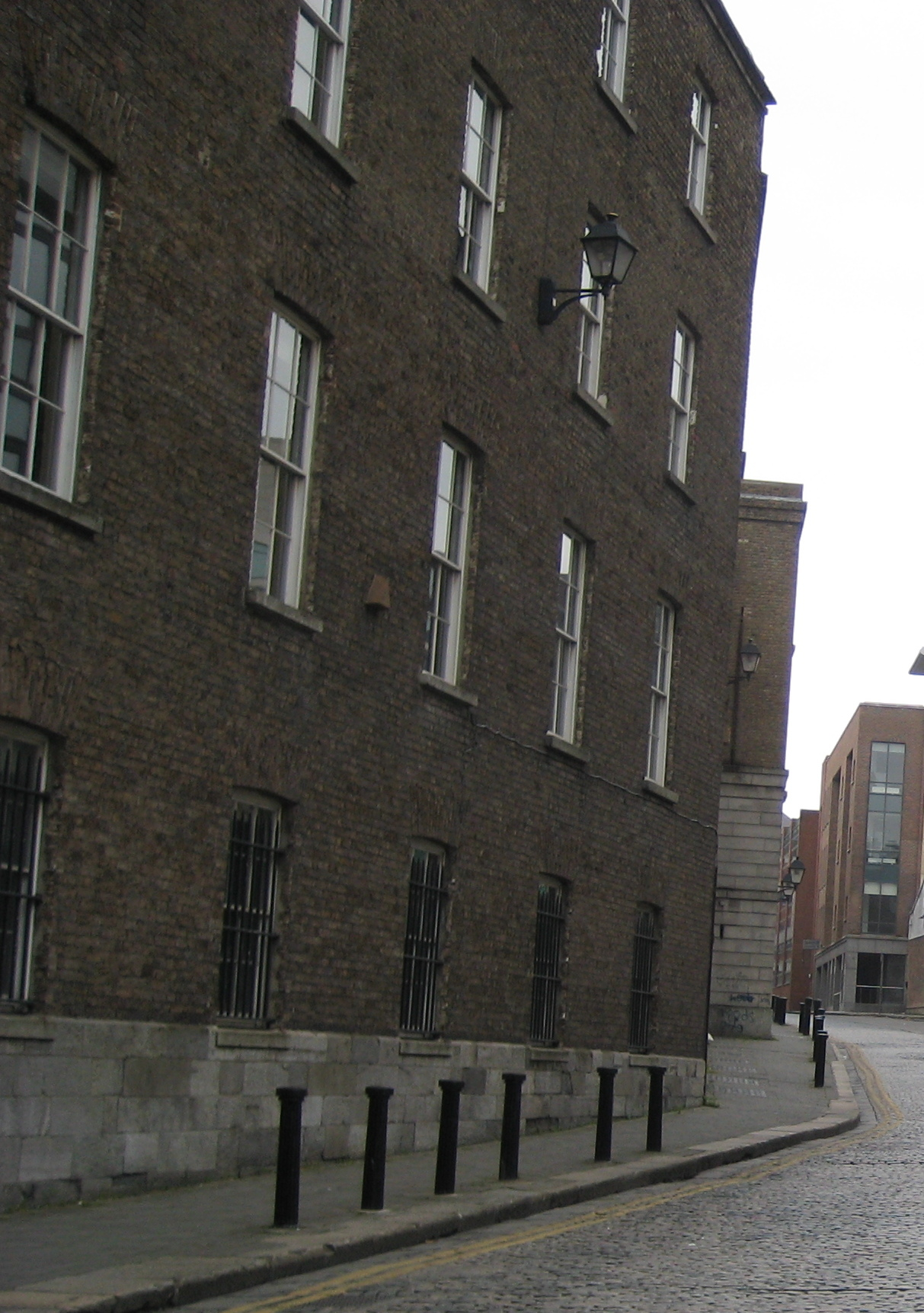
- Ship Street Barracks (on the left)

Site information
- Type: Barracks
- Operator: (Republic of Ireland) Irish Army

Location
- Location within Dublin
- Coordinates: 53.3417°N 6.2676°W

Site history
- Built: 1750
- Built for: War Office
- In use: 1860—1922

The Ship Street Barracks (Irish: Dún Shráid na Loinge) is a former military barracks to the rear (south west) of Dublin Castle in Dublin, Ireland facing on to Ship Street Great and Golden Lane.

The barracks are located close to the site of the former pool created by the River Poddle which gave Dublin its name from the Irish 'Dubh linn' meaning black pool.

== History ==
Four buildings were erected in about 1750 and, following the Irish rebellion of 1803, these buildings were converted for military use by British troops in around 1815. The primary role of the troops based in the barracks was to provide protection to Dublin Castle, which was the seat of the Lord Lieutenant of Ireland.

Another five buildings were added to the complex later, being completed between 1840 and 1860.

=== Easter Rising (1916) ===
Following an unsuccessful attempt led by Sean Connolly to seize Dublin Castle, and a more successful attempt to hold City Hall during the Easter Rising in April 1916, at least nine women, including Kathleen Lynn, Helena Molony, Annie and Emily Norgrove and Jennie Shanahan, were held in the barracks for some eight days.

The barracks were used by various British regiments in rotation during the Irish War of Independence. Following the withdrawal of British troops from Ireland, the barracks were placed in the hands of the Civic Guard by August 1922. Free State Civic Guard, Charles Eastwood, was accidentally shot dead by a colleague there in September 1922.

The barracks were subsequently abandoned and, by the 1980s, they were largely derelict.

The barracks were refurbished during the Irish Presidency of the Council of the European Union in 1996.

== See also ==
- Ship Street Little
- List of Irish military installations
