= D'Olier Street (restaurant) =

Restaurant in Dublin, Ireland

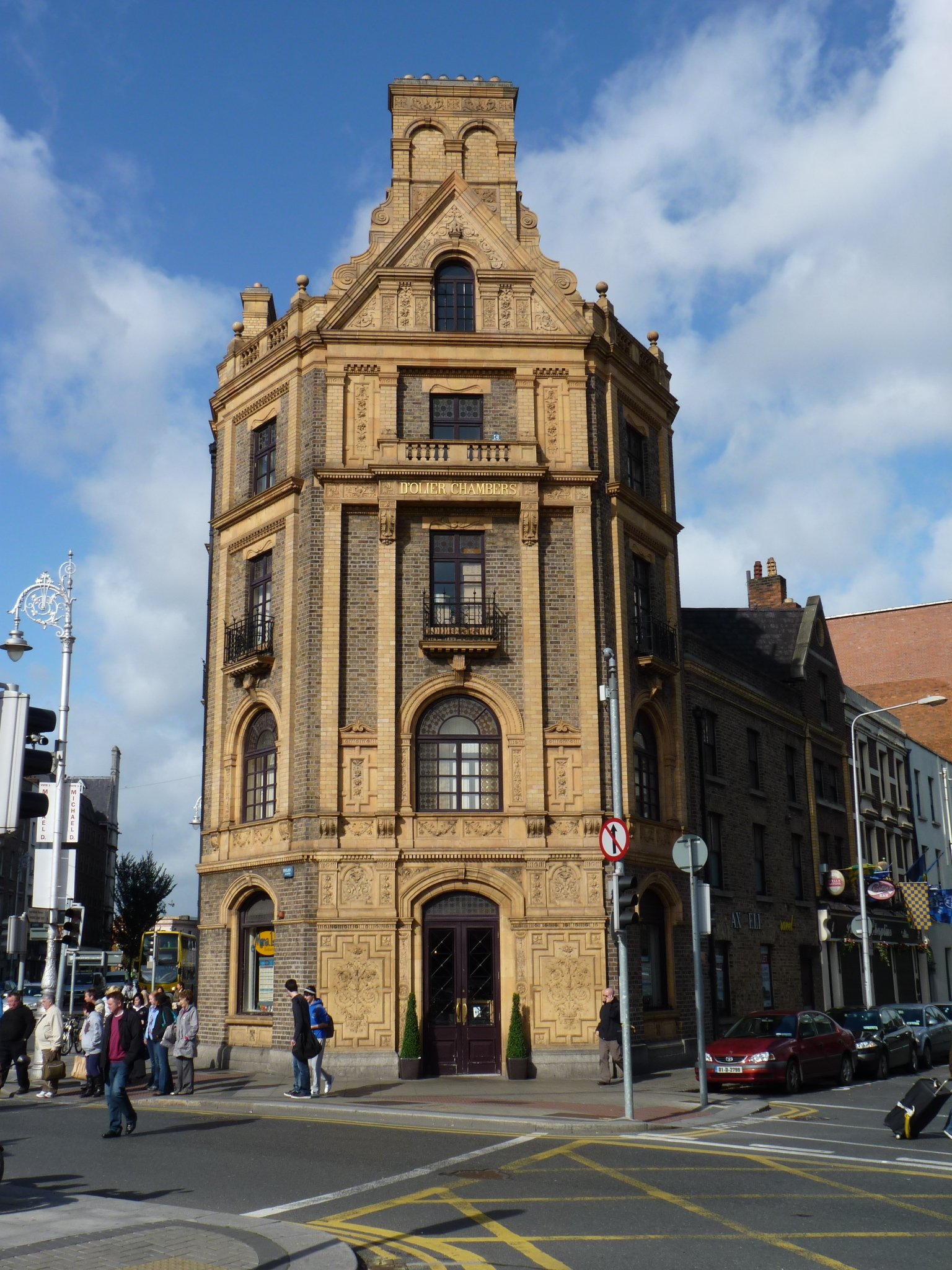
- D'Olier Chambers

- Location within Central Dublin

Restaurant information
- Established: 1 December 2022
- Owners: James Moore, Jane Frye and Anthony Smith
- Head chef: James Moore
- Food type: Fusion cuisine
- Rating: Michelin Guide
- Location: D'Olier Chambers, D'Olier Street, Dublin, D02 H589, Ireland
- Coordinates: 53°20′45″N 6°15′26″W
- Seating capacity: 38
- Reservations: Yes
- Other locations: Sister restaurant of Mr Fox
- Website: dolierstreetrestaurant.com

D'Olier Street (/dəˈlɪər/ duh-LEER) is a restaurant in central Dublin, Ireland. It is owned by James Moore, Jane Frye and Anthony Smith; Moore is also executive chef. It is located in D'Olier Chambers, a Victorian building at the south end of D'Olier Street.

== History ==
D'Olier Street opened on 1 December 2022.

It contains paintings by Casey Walshe.

It received a Michelin star for the first time in 2023.

== Awards ==
- Michelin star: 2023

== See also ==
- List of Michelin-starred restaurants in Ireland
