= Norgrove Family =

Nationalist family

The Norgrove Family were a Protestant Irish family, notable for their involvement in Irish nationalist rebellions, the Irish Citizen Army and the Dublin Lockout.

== Biographies ==
The Norgroves were notable for having five members of the one family take part in the rebellion in Dublin for the 1916 Easter Rising from the father George, his wife Maria, their two teenage daughters Emily and Annie, to the son, Fred, who was 12.

George had become involved in political activism during the Dublin Lockout when he joined the Irish Citizen Army and began to make bombs and store weapons in the family home. Both the two daughters and their mother also got involved in the lockout with the women joining the Irish Women Workers' Union (IWWU) and the women's section of the Citizen's Army.

=== George (1876–1937) ===
Born Alfred George Norgrove in Kingstown, now Dún Laoghaire, on 28 May 1876 to Alfred George and Martha Annie Norgrove. His father was a seaman based in Kingstown, County Dublin.

Living near the North Docks in Dublin, George was a gas fitter who was also a member of the Irish Citizen Army. He had been intended to lead a large group to take over the Shelbourne Hotel near Stephen's Green on the Monday of the Easter Rising in 1916. However, the conflicting messages and orders sent out by the leaders in advance of the Rising meant that this was not possible. As a result, he was based in the General Post Office and in the evening sent to support the group lead initially by Seán Connolly, who had failed to take Dublin Castle and were under attack in City Hall.

It was surrendered when it was taken by British troops on the morning of Tuesday 25 April. He was interned until December 1916 in Frongoch. During the Civil war in Ireland George was quartermaster for the Irish Citizen Army. He also fought for the Anti-Treaty forces in Dublin in 1922. He used his home as an arms dump for the Irish Citizen Army and the IRA until a raid in February 1925. He was arrested and imprisoned again as a result.

He died on 18 February 1937.

=== Maria (c.1877–1934) ===
Very little is known about Maria. She was born Ellen Maria Carter and married George Norgrove in Monkstown in 1897. She served with Constance Markievicz in the Stephen's Green/College of Surgeon's Garrison as well as Jacob's Biscuit Factory. She died in 1934, three years before her husband.

=== Emily (1897–1977) ===
Emily Norgrove born on 28 November 1897 also served with the Irish Citizen Army from 1913 during the Dublin Lockout. She was a good singer and used that to raise money in Liberty Hall when concerts were held.

She was part of the force which captured City Hall on Easter Monday. She was arrested when the City Hall was recaptured by British Forces and taken to Ship Street Barracks initially. From there she was taken with the rest of the women to Richmond Barracks and onto Kilmainham Gaol. She was released on May 22. She went on to marry an Irish republican, John (later Sean) Hanratty, who due to an injury was unable to take part in the Rising but was active during the War of Independence and the Civil War. They had two children.

Emily was interviewed for the RTÉ documentary series The Week of the Rising, which aired on 12 April 1966.

She died on 16 September 1977

=== Annie (1899–1976) ===
Annie Norgrove, born 10 July 1899, was the younger sister based in the garrison at City Hall on Easter Monday 1916. She delivered water to the men stationed on the roof of the Hall and was nearly shot by British snipers. The garrison was taken over by the British on the Tuesday morning early. She was arrested and taken to Ship Street Barracks initially. She was moved with her sister to Richmond Barracks and Kilmainham Gaol. She was released on May 22. She went on to marry William 'Bill' Grange and had three children. She was with Helena Molony when the City Hall Garrison fell.

A voice said, ‘Surrender, in the name of the King.’ At this point I felt a pluck on my arm, and our youngest girl, Annie Norgrove. said to me, ‘Miss Molony, Miss Molony, we are not going to give in? Mr Connolly said we were not to surrender.’ She was terrified, but there was no surrender about her."

After the Rising she remained active in the Irish Citizen army and was on the Anti-Treaty side in the Civil War. She took part in a wide range of activities during the period 1916–1923. She died in 1976.

=== Fred (1903–1973) ===
Frederick Norgrove was born on 12 July 1903 which meant he was only 12 during the Easter Rising. He served in the Irish Citizen Army Boys Corps in the GPO. However he was sent home by James Connolly on the Wednesday for being too young to take part.

He died 30 October 1973.
