= O'Connell Bridge =

Bridge over the River Liffey in Ireland

O'Connell Bridge Droichead Uí Chonaill
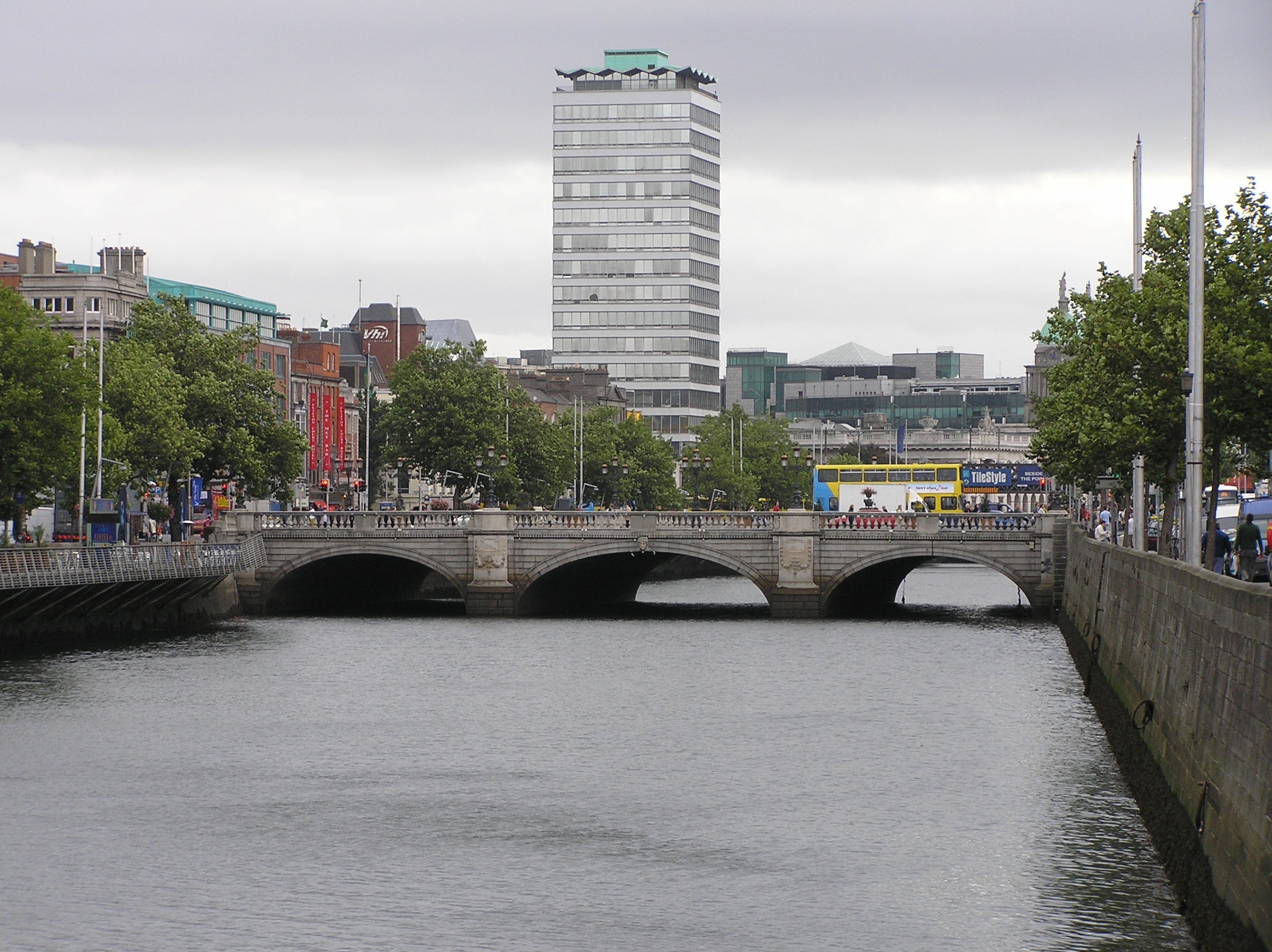
- O'Connell Bridge viewed from the west
- Coordinates: 53.3473°N 6.2591°W
- Crosses: River Liffey
- Locale: Dublin, Ireland
- Other name: Carlisle Bridge
- Preceded by: Ha'penny Bridge
- Followed by: Rosie Hackett Bridge

Characteristics
- Material: Granite, portland stone
- Total length: ~45 m
- Width: ~50 m (~45 m between parapets)
- No. of spans: 3

History
- Designer: James Gandon
- Construction start: 1791; 235 years ago (reconstruction commenced 1877; 149 years ago)
- Construction end: 1794; 232 years ago (reconstruction completed 1882; 144 years ago)

Location
- Interactive map of O'Connell Bridge

O'Connell Bridge (Irish: Droichead Uí Chonaill) is a road bridge spanning the River Liffey in Dublin, Ireland, which joins O'Connell Street to D'Olier Street, Westmoreland Street and the south quays.

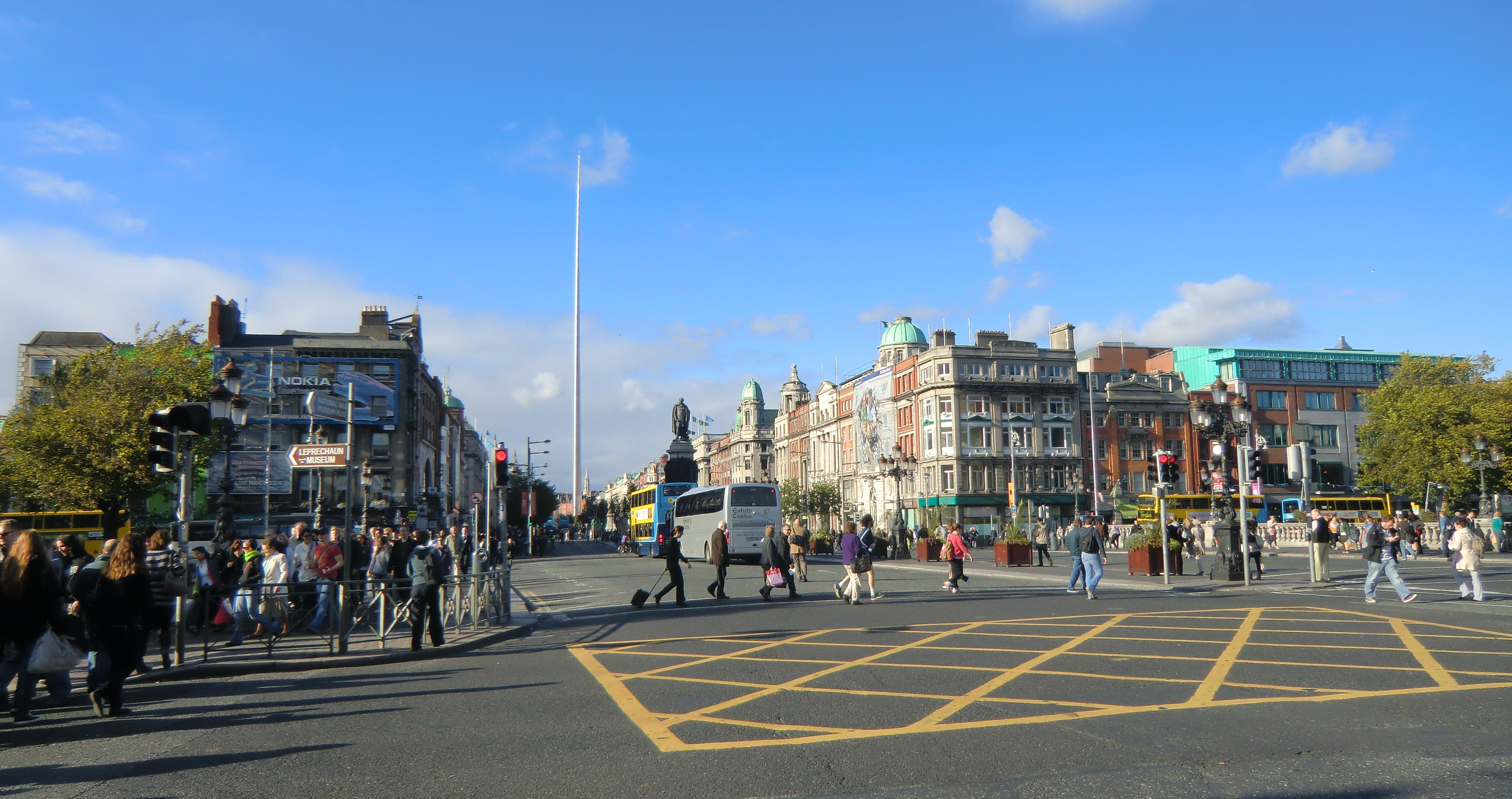
View of bridge from the south with O'Connell Street in the background

== History ==
=== Carlisle Bridge ===
The original bridge named Carlisle Bridge after the Earl of Carlisle, Lord Lieutenant of Ireland from 1780 to 1782, was designed by James Gandon, and built between 1791 and 1794.

Originally humped, and narrower, Carlisle Bridge was a symmetrical, three semicircular arch structure constructed in granite with a Portland stone balustrade and obelisks on each of the four corners. A keystone head at the apex of the central span symbolises the River Liffey, corresponding to the heads on the Custom House (also designed by James Gandon) which personify the other great rivers of Ireland.

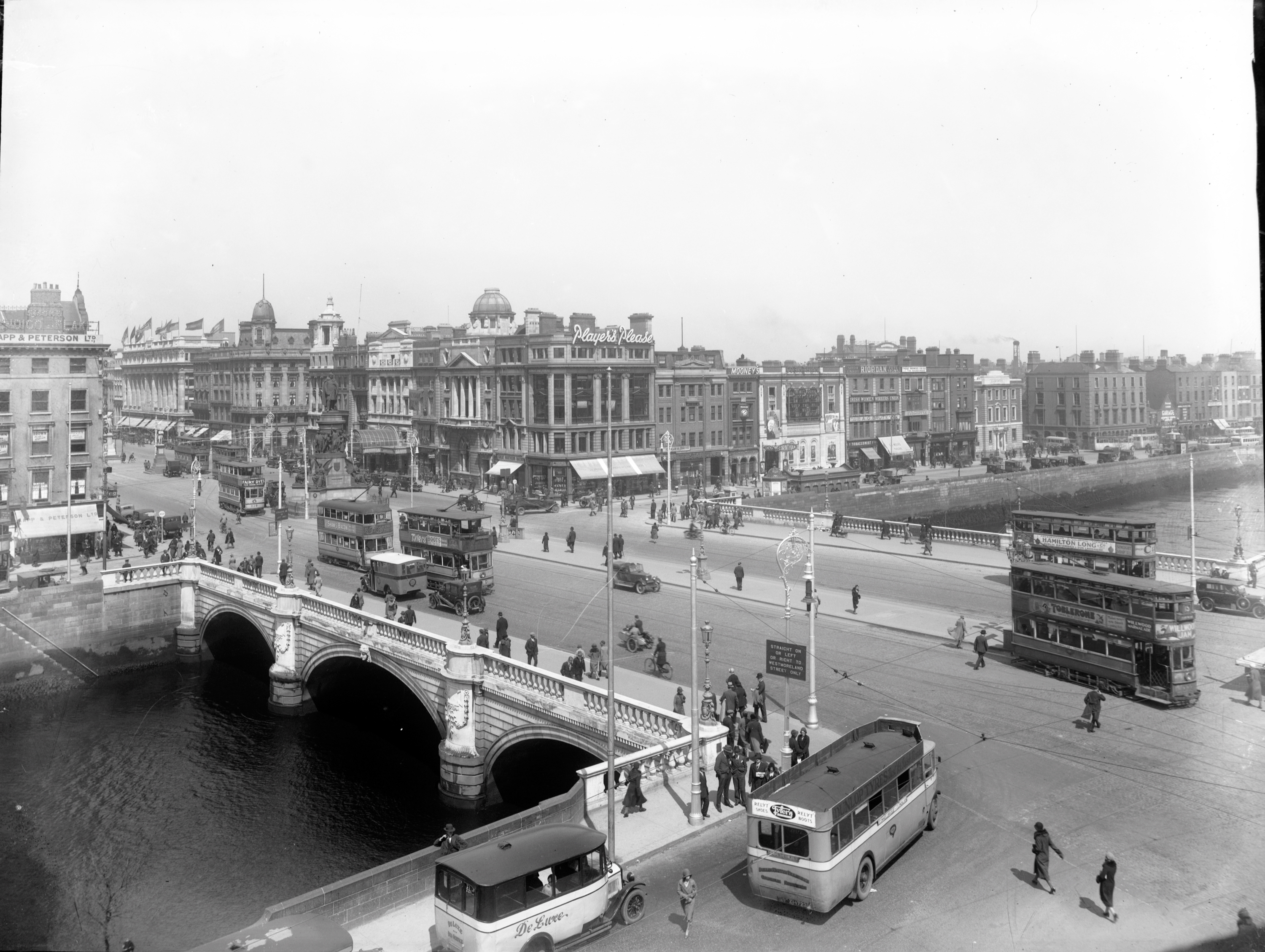
Straight on or left or right to Westmoreland Street only. A busy scene from the 1930s with Dublin United Tramways Company trams.

=== O'Connell Bridge reconstruction ===
Since 1860, following similar work on Essex Bridge (now Grattan Bridge) to improve the streetscape and relieve traffic congestion on the bridge, it was intended to widen Carlisle Bridge to bring it to the same width as 70-metre (230 ft)-wide Sackville Street (now O'Connell Street), which formed the north side carriageway connection to the Bridge. Between 1877 and 1880 the bridge was reconstructed and widened. As can be seen on orthophotography it spans now 45 m (148 ft) of the Liffey and is about 50 m (160 ft) wide.

When the bridge was reopened around 1882 it was renamed for Daniel O'Connell, when the statue in his honour was unveiled. (Note: There are actually two O'Connell Bridges in Dublin. The other spans the pond in St Stephen's Green.)

In recent years, the lamps that graced the central island have been restored to their five-lantern glory. In 2004, a pair of pranksters installed a plaque on the bridge dedicated to Father Pat Noise, which remained unnoticed until May 2006, and was still there as of June 2020.

Carlisle Bridge, c. the 1870s

== In popular culture ==
The bridge is the setting of Liam O'Flaherty's short story The Sniper, and is also referenced in several other works, including James Joyce's novel Ulysses.

Arthur Fields, locally known as The Man on The Bridge, took more than 182,000 photographs of pedestrians on the bridge from the 1930s to the 1980s.
