= Westmoreland Street =

Street in Dublin, Ireland

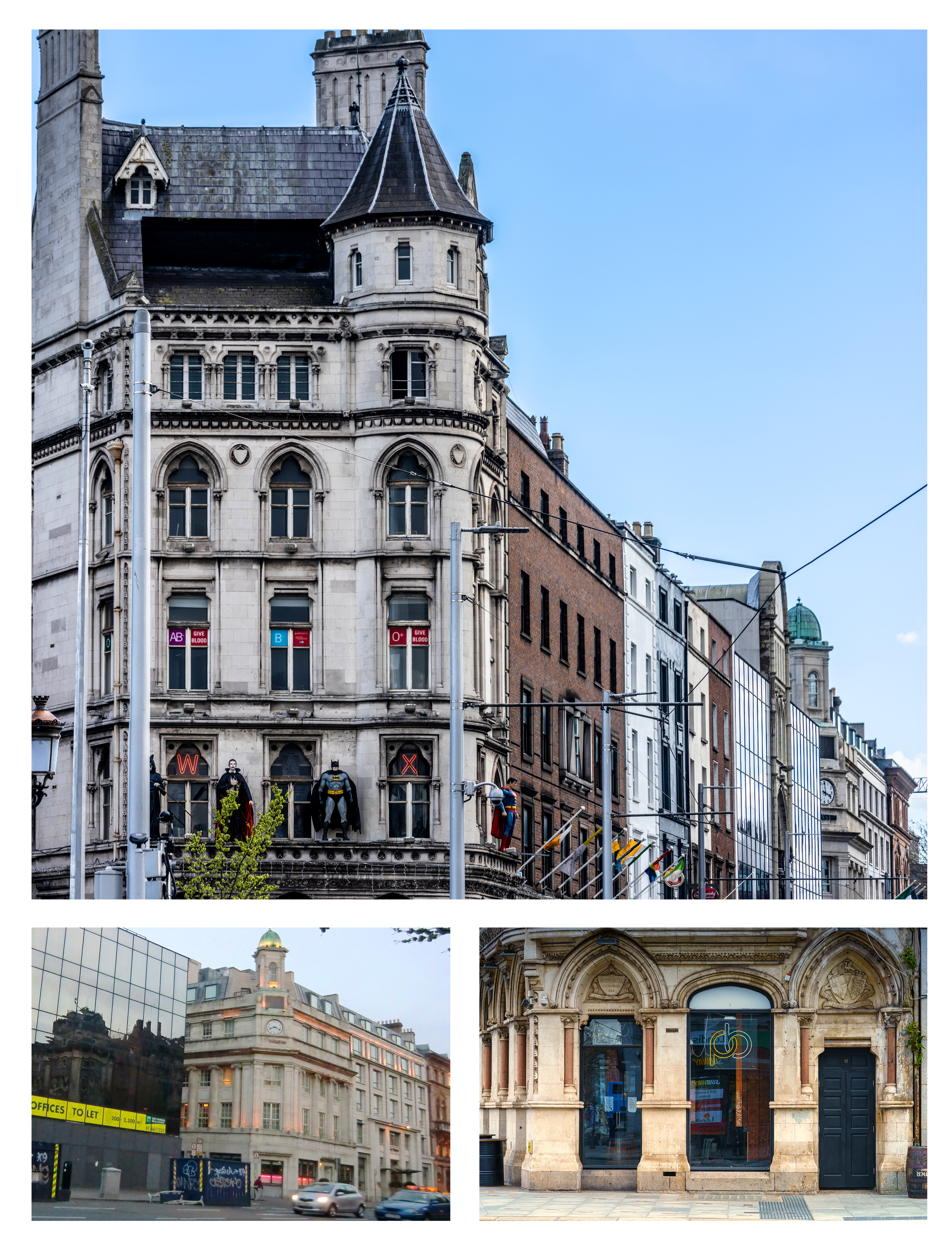
- Clockwise from top: Lafayette Building at its intersection with Westmoreland Street; the Lafayette Building on Westmoreland Street; the Westin Hotel

- Location within Central Dublin
- Native name: Sráid Westmoreland (Irish)
- Namesake: John Fane, 10th Earl of Westmorland
- Length: 220 m (720 ft)
- Width: 29 metres (95 ft)
- Location: Dublin, Ireland
- Postal code: D02
- Coordinates: 53°20′44″N 6°15′33″W
- north end: Aston Quay, O'Connell Bridge
- south end: College Green

Other
- Known for: restaurants

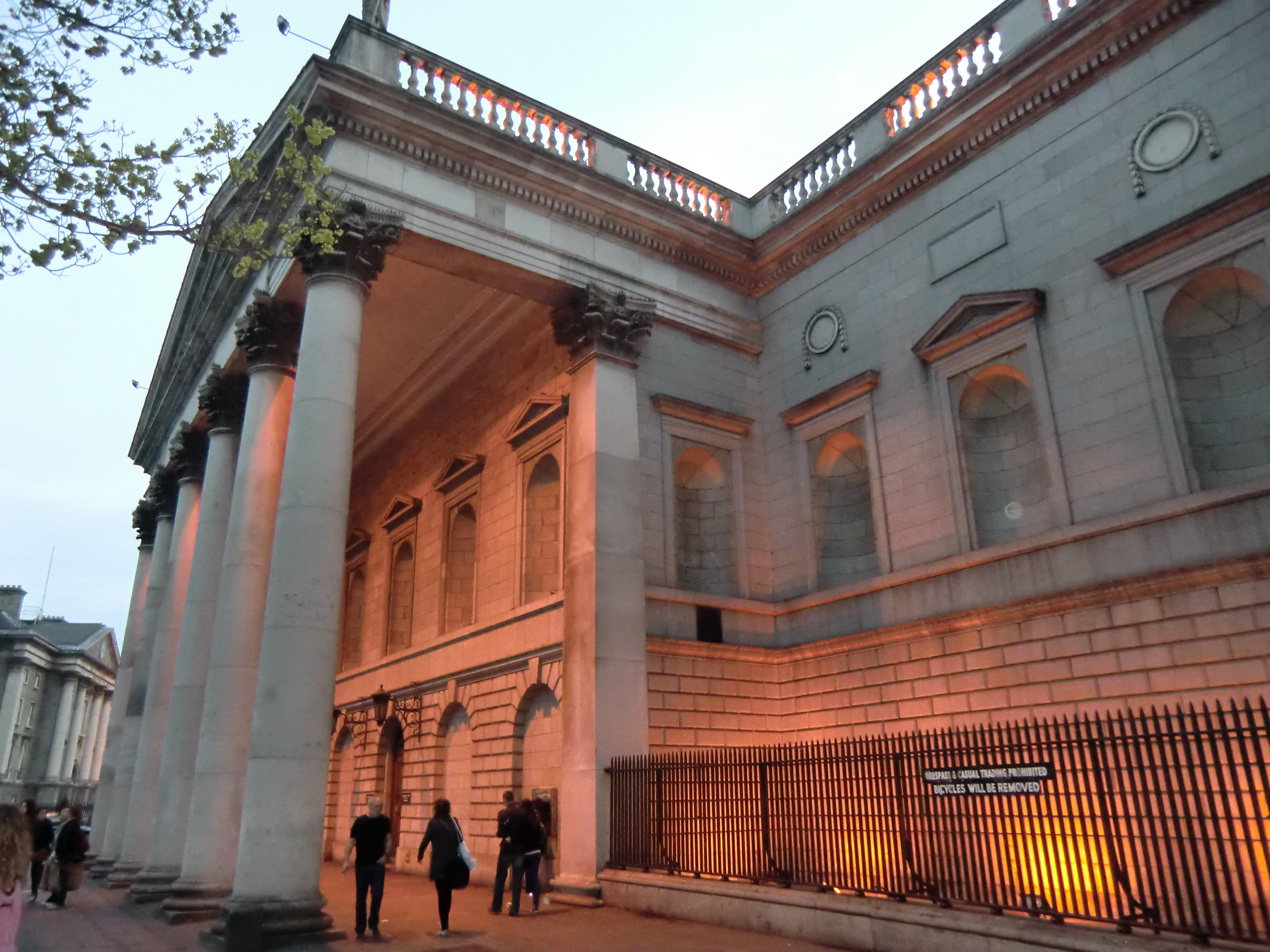
Bank of Ireland, College Green, seen from Westmoreland Street

Westmoreland Street (Irish: Sráid Westmoreland) is a street on the Southside of Dublin. It is currently a one-way street. It carries a segment of the R138 road for northbound traffic; nearby D'Olier Street carries southbound traffic of that segment.

== Location ==
It is one of the two broad avenues, along with D'Olier Street, that converge at their northern ends at O'Connell Bridge over the River Liffey. Westmoreland Street links the bridge to Trinity College at College Green at its southern end, from where traffic diverges between Grafton Street to the south and Dame Street to the west. Westmoreland Street also constitutes the eastern border of Temple Bar.

== History ==
The street is named after John Fane, 10th Earl of Westmorland, who was Lord Lieutenant of Ireland from 1789 to 1794. It was one of the last streets laid out by the Wide Streets Commission, with the original plans set out in 1792 by Henry Aaron Baker and accepted in 1799.

In 1967, there was an attempt to rename the street to President Kennedy Street, as during President John F. Kennedy's visit to Dublin in 1963, his motorcade traveled along Westmoreland Street. Dublin City Corporation balloted rate-payers on the street on the proposed change, but the vote failed when only 33 ratepayers voted in favor, short of the 47 required.

== Architecture ==
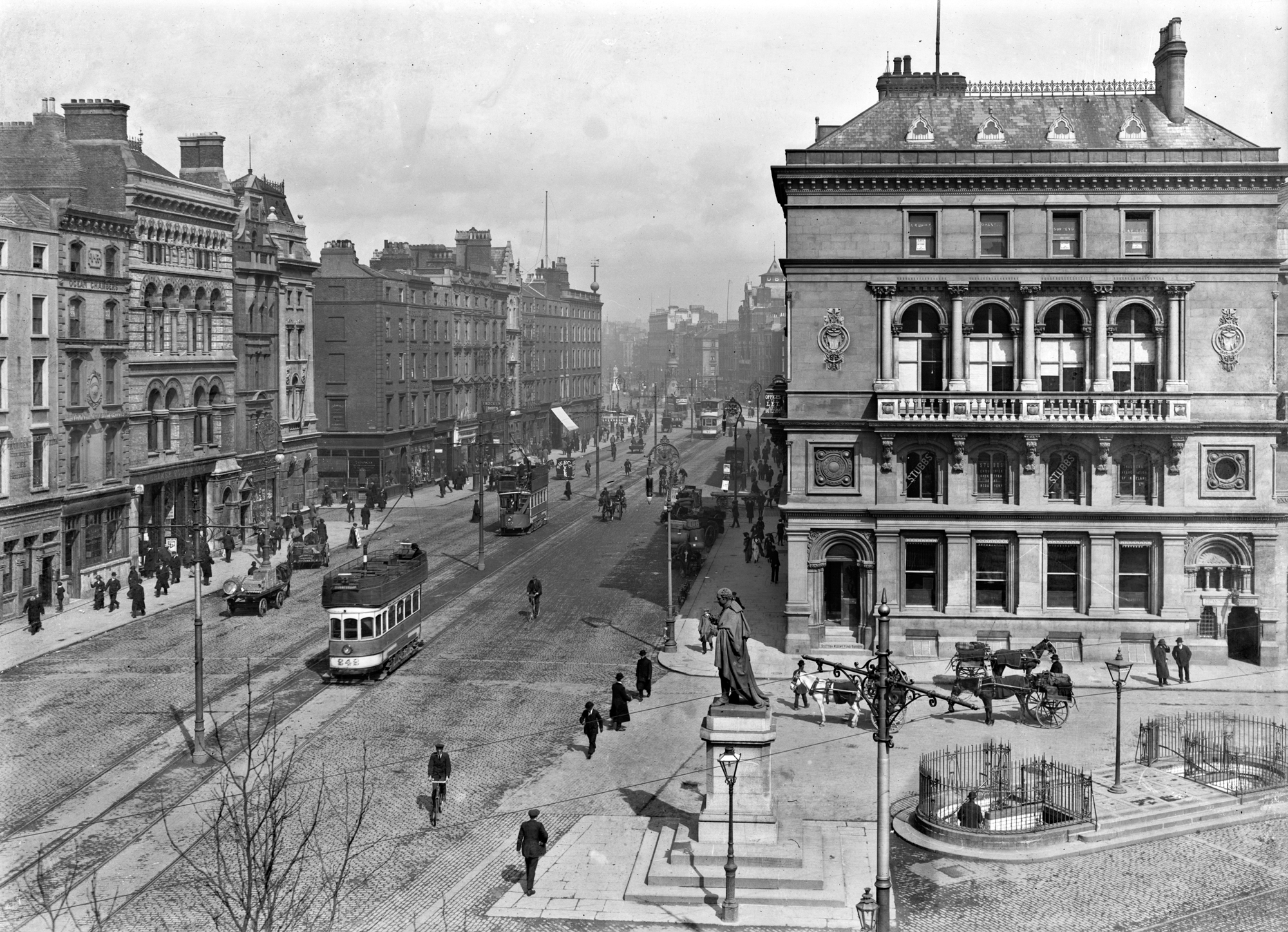
Westmoreland Street in the early 20th century

One of the dominant buildings on the street is the former Educational Chambers on the corner of Fleet Street. The original building and facade were significantly altered with a design by architect Sam Stephenson in the early 1970s for EBS. The terracotta facade was demolished and replaced with dark mirror glass which was dubbed a "diabolical black box" by a city councillor at the time it was constructed. The EBS had also acquired three adjoining buildings, the Paradiso restaurant, the main office of The Irish Times, and Graham's pharmacy with plans to demolish these and replicate the dark glass treatment. However, the planers insisted on solid granite elements for this side of the facade, which rendered the whole scheme lop-sided. The facade of the former Paradiso, an art nouveau design, was retained within the centre of the redevelopment and houses the building's atrium.

== Public transport ==
Westmoreland Luas stop is on the Luas Green Line (northbound only). This line connects with the Red Line and runs between Broombridge or Parnell in the north of the city and Brides Glen in Cherrywood. Construction started in June 2013 with services beginning in December 2017.

In 2025, the busiest bus stop in the entire Dublin Bus network was Stop 319 on Westmoreland Street, where 1.25 million passengers boarded buses.

== See also ==
- Pat Ingoldsby, Irish poet and TV presenter, sold his books on the street for over 20 years
