= Fleet Street, Dublin =

Street in Ireland

Fleet Street
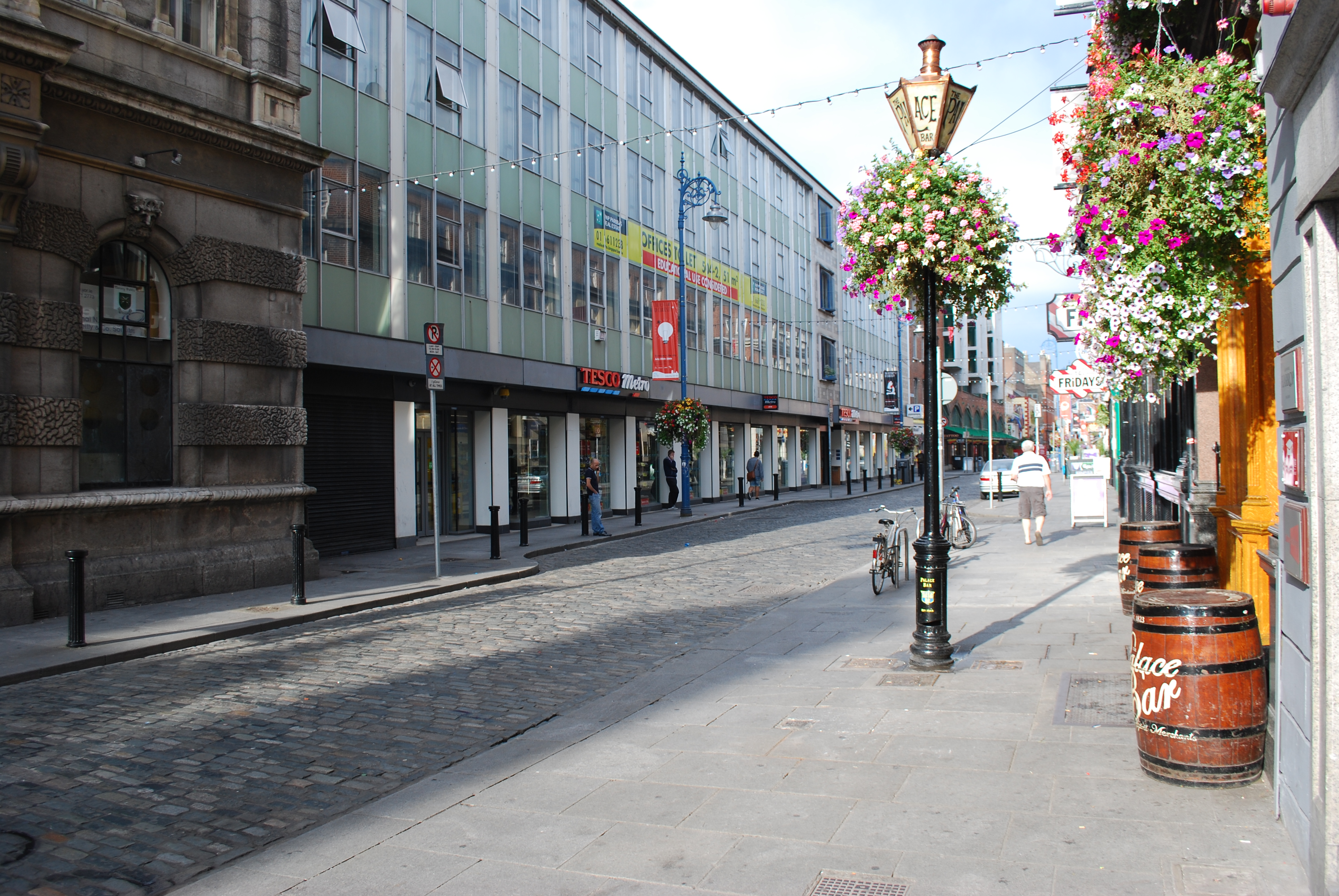

- Location within Central Dublin
- Native name: Sráid na Toinne (Irish)
- Namesake: "fleet" of ships that once moored on it; may have been inspired by Fleet Street, London
- Length: 333 m (1,093 ft)
- Width: 12 metres (39 ft)
- Location: Dublin, Ireland
- Postal code: D02
- Coordinates: 53°20′45″N 6°15′38″W
- west end: Temple Bar, Asdill's Row
- east end: D'Olier Street, Townsend Street, College Street

Other
- Known for: pubs and hotels

Fleet Street (Irish: Sráid na Toinne) is a street on the southside of Dublin, Ireland. Located in the Dublin 2 area, Fleet Street runs eastwards, parallel to the River Liffey, through Temple Bar, across Westmoreland Street to D'Olier Street.

== History ==
The street formerly marked the southern edge of the River Liffey, and was known in Irish as Sráid na Toinne ("street of the waves"). Its name may refer to the "fleet" of ships that moored along it, or it may be imitative of Fleet Street, London; many streets on Dublin's southside are named for London streets, and Dublin's Fleet Street is east of Dublin's Temple Bar, just as London's Fleet Street is east of London's Temple Bar.

In 1902, Irish revolutionary Kevin Barry was born at number 8, Fleet Street, where his father ran a dairy business.

In the 1970s, it was home to Sloopy's, Ireland's first discotheque.

Although a wealthy area, and a centre of furniture-making, Fleet Street went into decline in the 20th century and in the 1980s was set to be demolished, and a bus terminus built in its place. Instead, it was revived as a cultural area. Today it is known for its many pubs, cafés and restaurants, including the Hard Rock Cafe, the Oliver St. John Gogarty, Bowes, and The Palace Bar. Fleet Street also contains the Irish HQ of Amnesty International, at Seán MacBride House.

In 2022, travel website The World Bucket List ranked Fleet Street as one of Europe's 15 most beautiful streets, calling it "the capital city’s most bustling street […] A picturesque cobbled street, Fleet Street comes alive at night and encapsulates the craic and hospitality that Ireland is known for."

== Cultural references ==
Fleet Street appears several times in the work of James Joyce: in "The Boarding House" he mentions "Jack Mooney, the Madam’s son, who was clerk to a commission agent in Fleet Street", while in "Counterparts" he mentions "Terry Kelly’s pawn-office in Fleet Street". In Ulysses, Leopold Bloom stands at "Fleet street crossing."

== Gallery ==
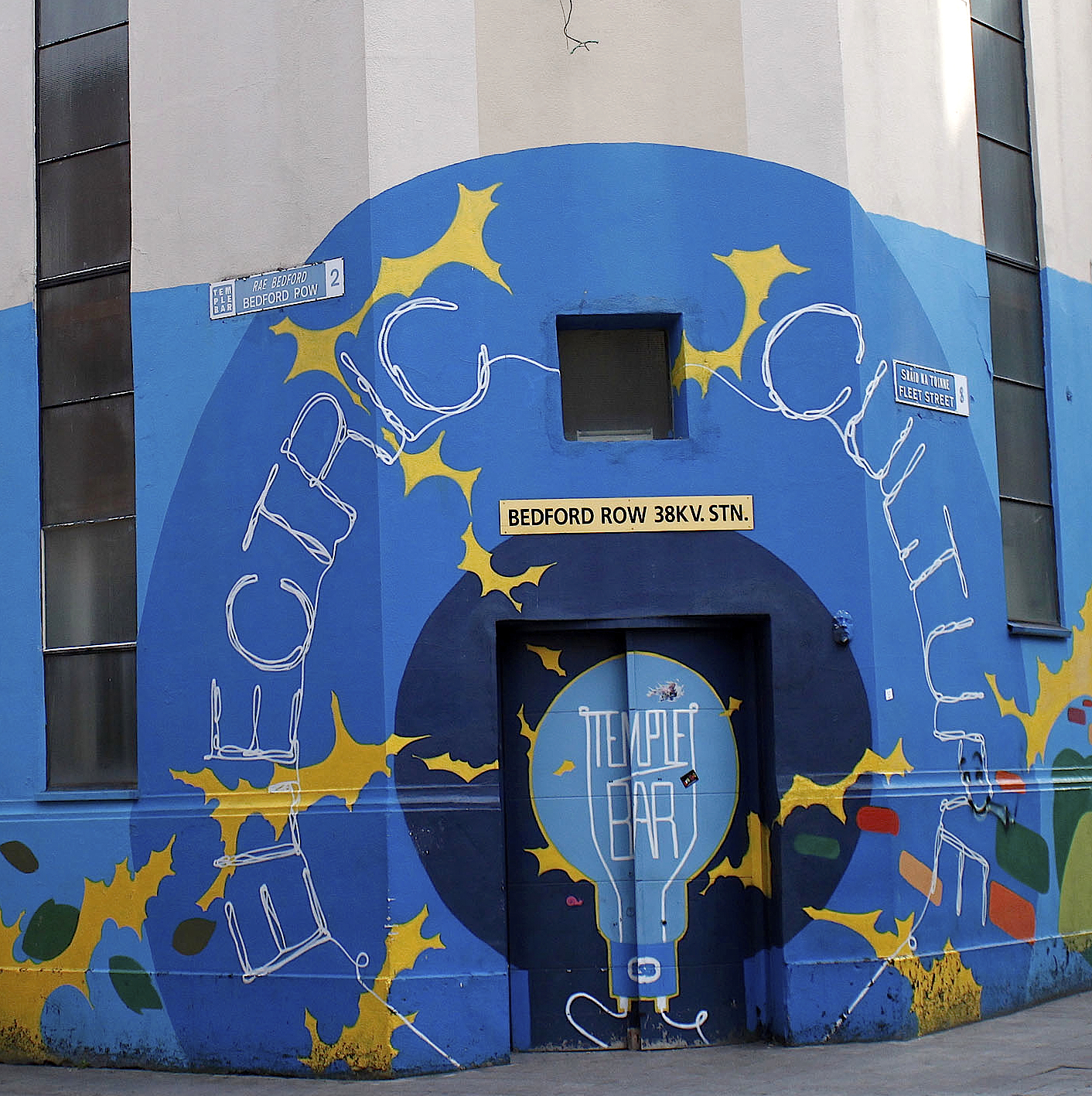
Electricity substation at junction with Bedford Row

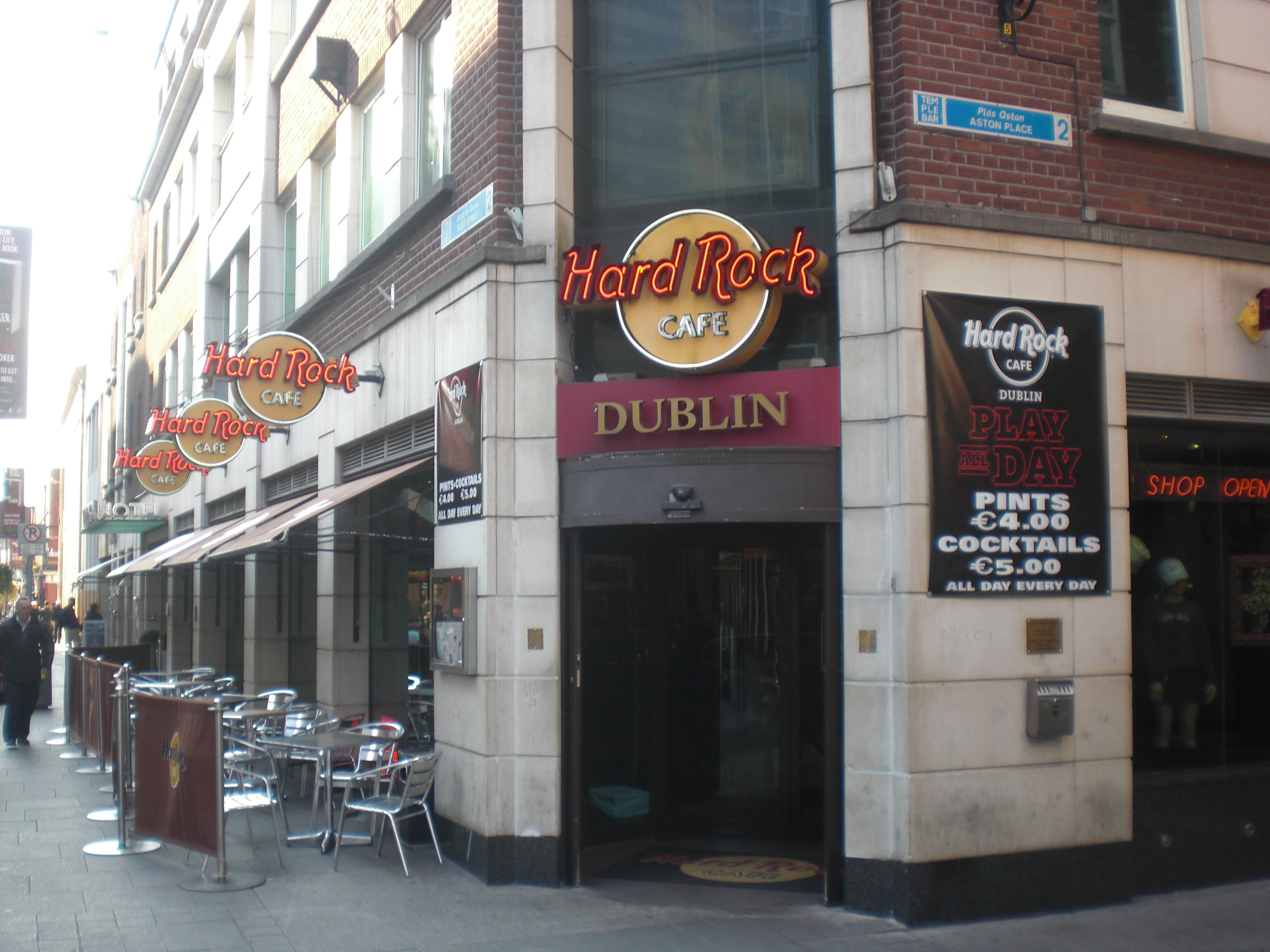
Hard Rock Café at junction with Aston Place

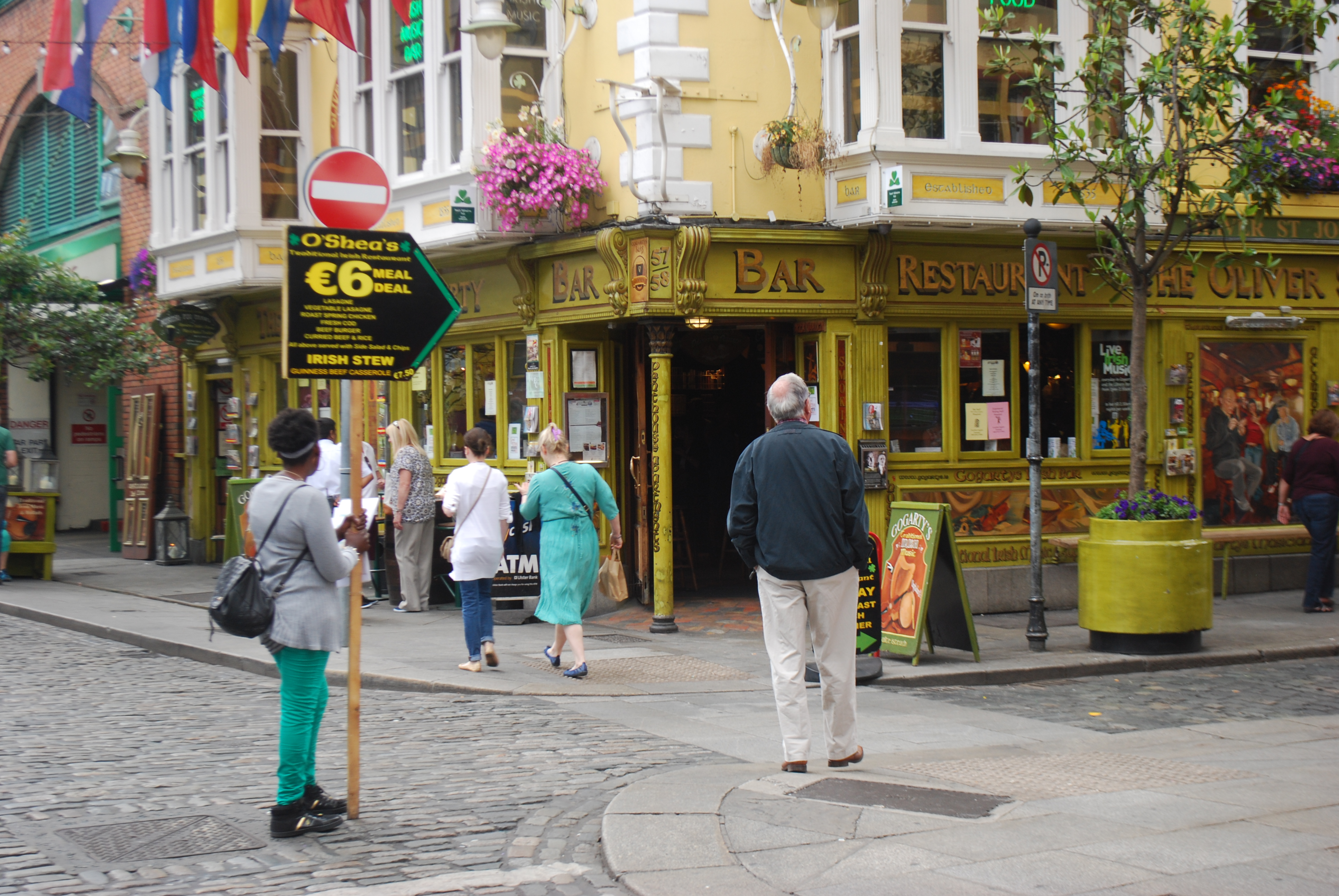
Oliver St. John Gogarty pub and restaurant

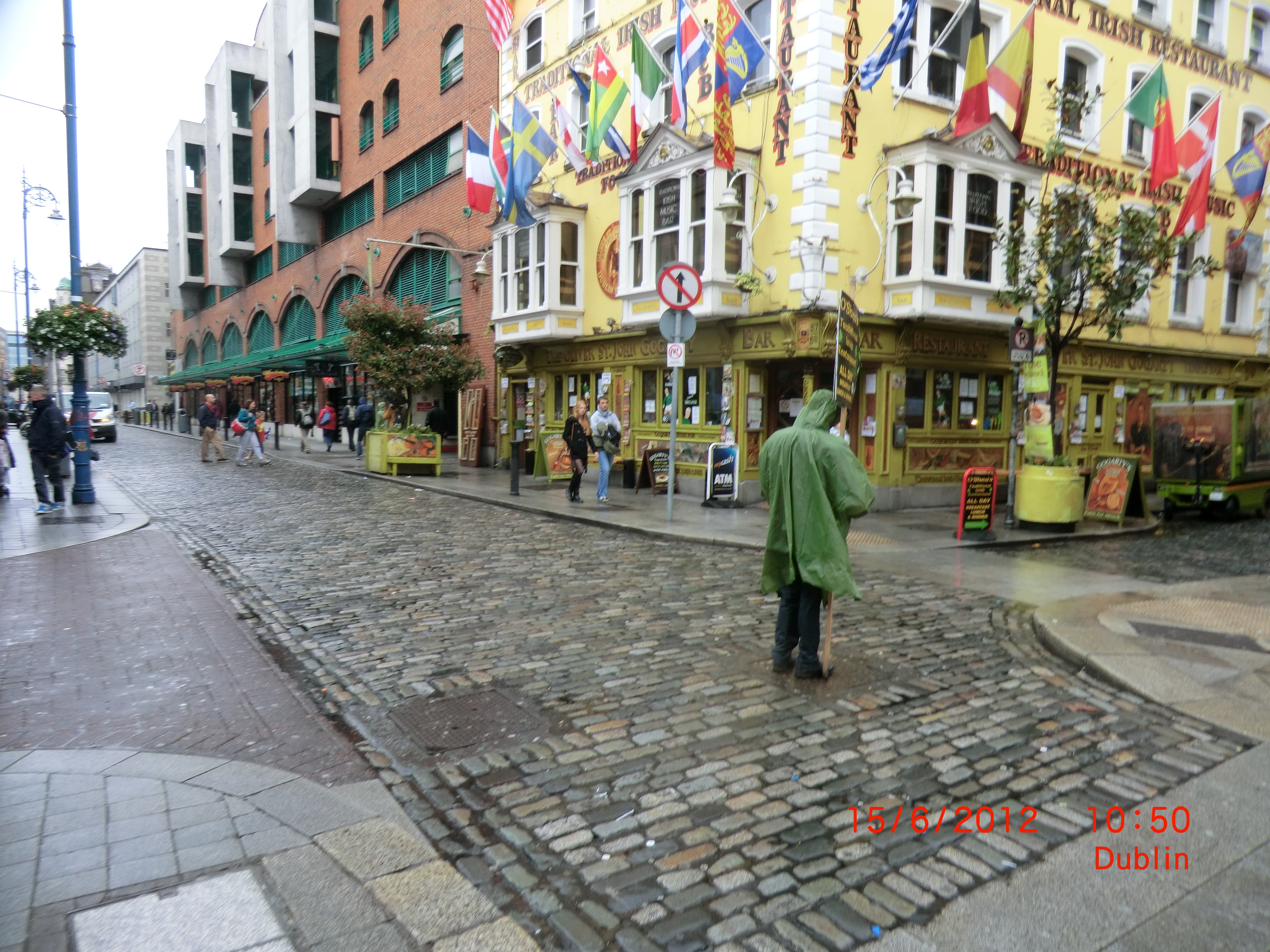
Streetscape

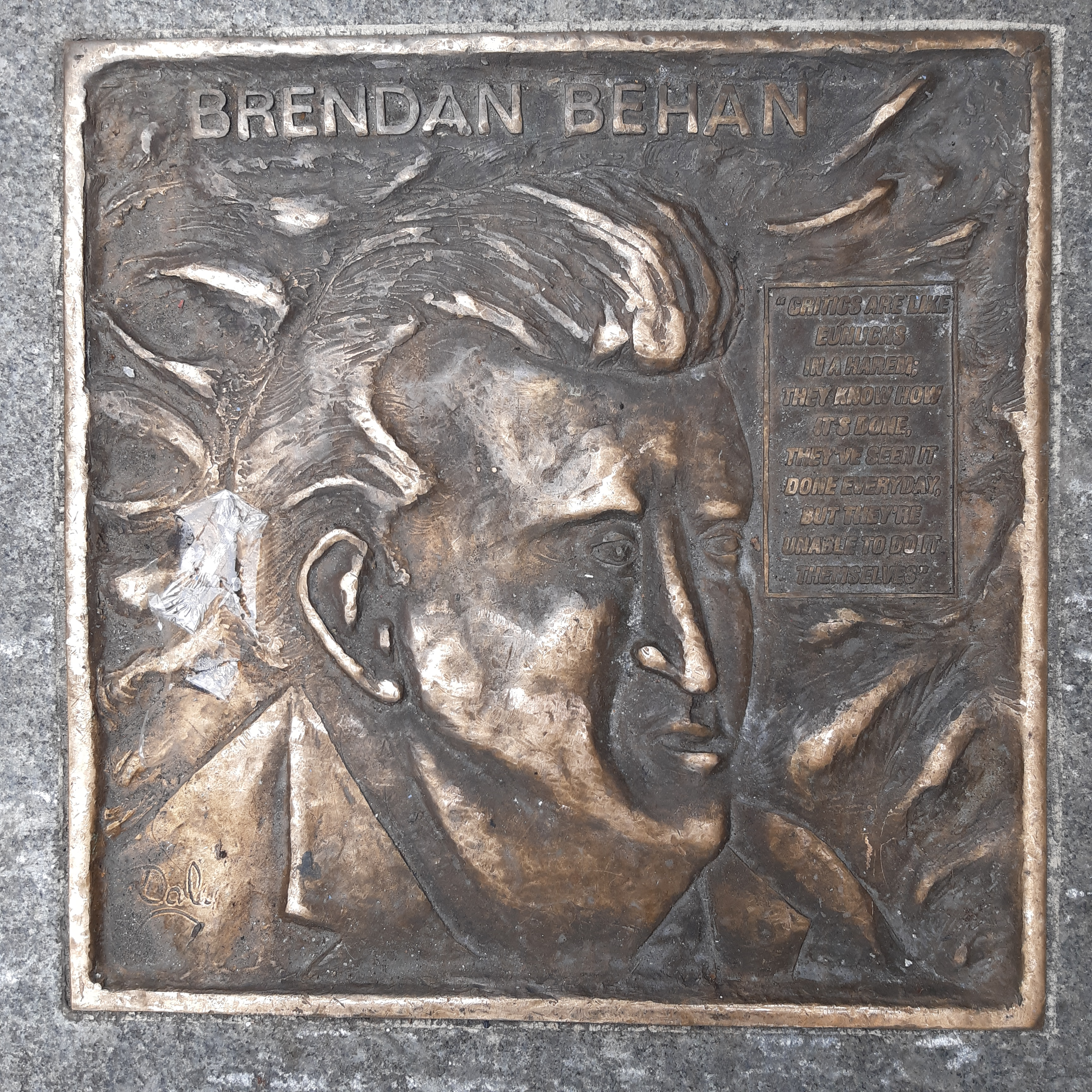
A bronze plaque set in the pavement outside The Palace Bar in memory of Brendan Behan

== See also ==
- List of streets and squares in Dublin
