= D'Olier Street =

Street in Dublin, Ireland

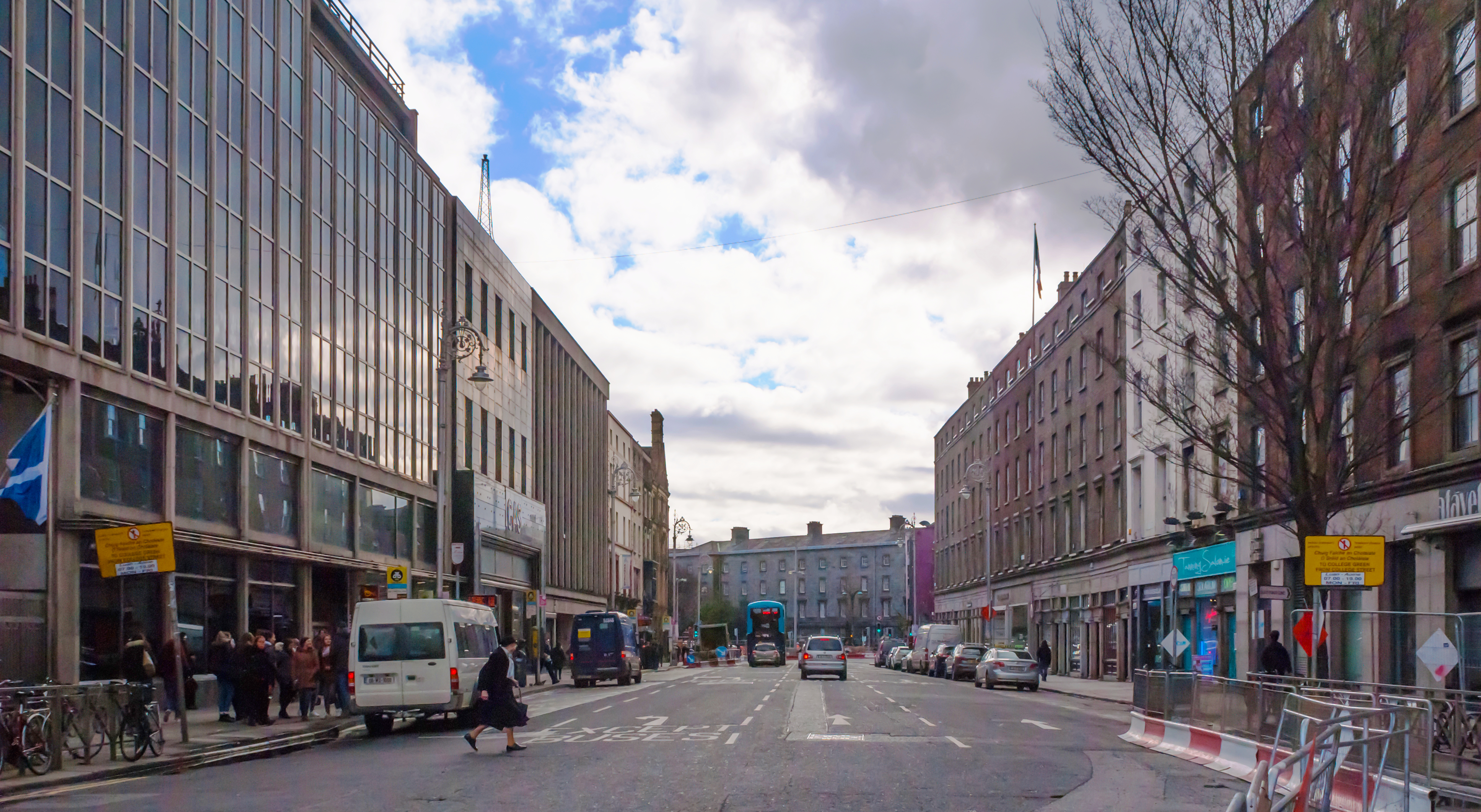
- D'Olier Street looking southeast

- Location within Central Dublin
- Native name: Sráid D'Olier (Irish)
- Namesake: Jeremiah D'Olier
- Length: 160 m (520 ft)
- Width: 22 metres (72 ft)
- Location: Dublin, Ireland
- Postal code: D02
- Coordinates: 53.346494°N 6.25823°W
- northwest end: O'Connell Bridge
- southeast end: College Street, Townsend Street

Other
- Known for: The Irish Times, O'Connell Bridge House

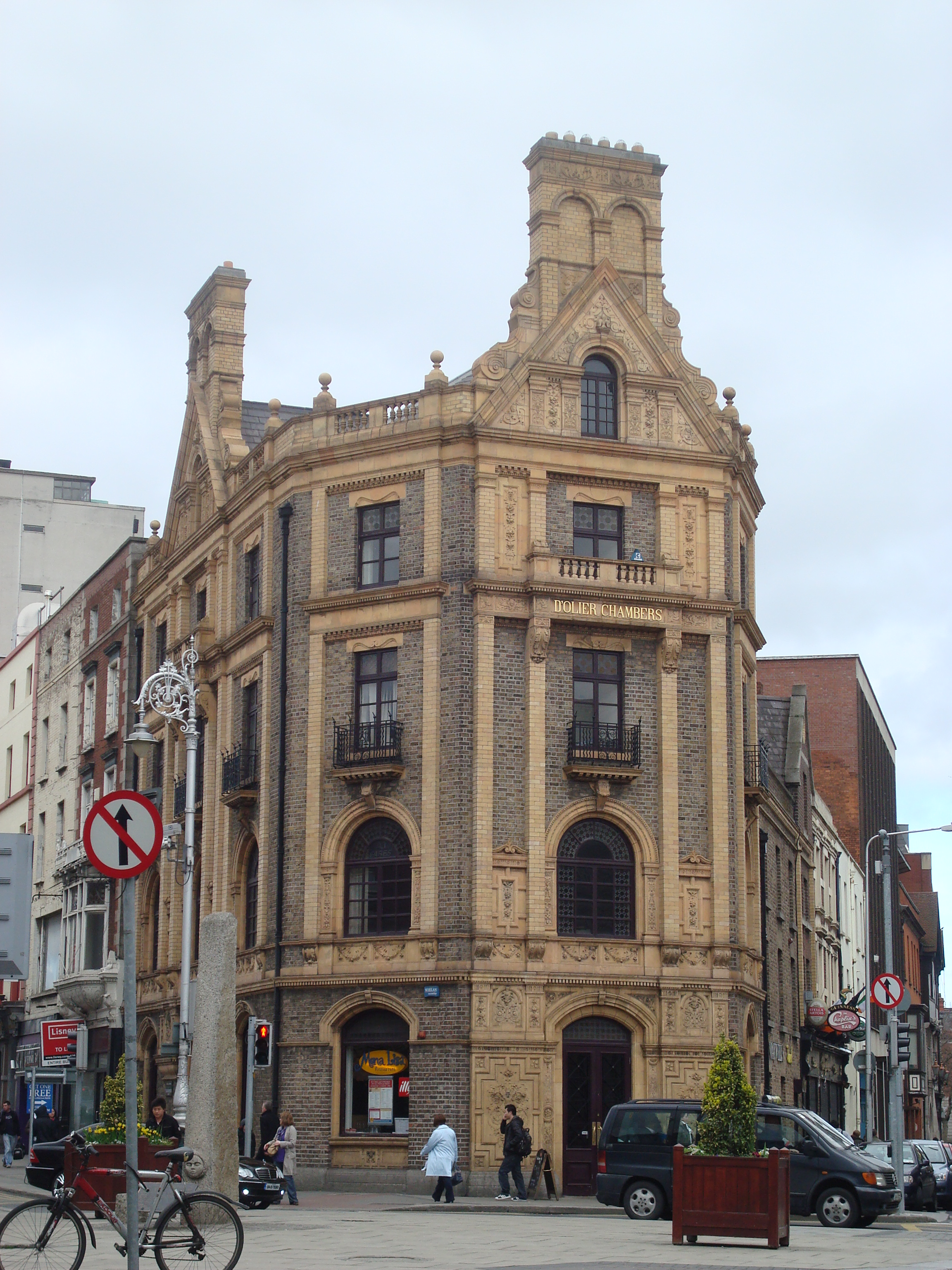
The D'Olier Chambers building is on the corner of D'Olier Street and Hawkins Street. It contains the D'Olier Street restaurant.

D'Olier Street (/dəˈlɪər/ duh-LEER; Irish: Sráid D'Olier) is a street in the southern city-centre of Dublin, the capital of Ireland. It and Westmoreland Street are two broad streets whose northern ends meet at the southern end of O'Connell Bridge over the River Liffey. Its southern end meets Fleet Street, Townsend Street, College Street and Pearse Street.

== History ==
The street is named after Jeremiah D'Olier (1745–1817), a Huguenot goldsmith and a founder of the Bank of Ireland. D'Olier was the Sheriff of Dublin City in 1788 and a member of the Wide Streets Commission. The street was one of the last major interventions in the Dublin city plan to be executed by the Wide Streets Commissioners.

== Notable addresses ==
From 1895 to 2006, Irish Times was based in D'Olier Street, leading the paper to be nicknamed The Old Lady of D'Olier Street. The paper is now based in Tara Street.

O'Connell Bridge House is located at 2 D'Olier Street. This office development was extended in 1968, by the same developer as O'Connell Bridge House, John Byrne. Alongside D'Olier House these modern office blocks surround the former headquarters of the Dublin Gas Company, a rare surviving art deco building in Dublin, which was also designed by Desmond FitzGerald. D'Olier House has been leased by the Department of Social Welfare since shortly after its completion.

In 1830, Samuel Lover was secretary of the Royal Hibernian Academy and lived at number 9 D'Olier Street.

In 1891 James Franklin Fuller designed the D'Olier Chambers building of yellow brick and terracotta for the Gallaher Tobacco Company.

Manchester United opened a team store on the street in 2000 having signed a 15-year lease at €520,000 per annum. It closed in 2002. The lease expired in August 2015.

A number of nightclubs have operated on the street, including Club XXI and Redz in the 2000s. As of March 2020 Tramline, at number 21, was the only club in operation on the street.

The Dublin central clinic of the Irish Blood Transfusion Service is based on the 2nd Floor of LaFayette House on the street. As of 2013, the IBTS were renting the second and third floors of the building at a fee of €105,000 per annum. In 2014 the IBTS considered moving to a cheaper city centre location due to high running costs, but remain on D'Olier Street as of May 2022.

The Lafayette Building, on the junction of Westmoreland Street and D'Olier Street, is a six-storey over basement block which has been described as a "landmark building which looks straight down O’Connell Street and dominates the city streetscape next to O'Connell Bridge". Developed in the 1890s for the Liverpool and Lancashire Insurance Company and designed by architect John Joseph O'Callaghan, it was described as a "Portland stone baronial exercise with Gothic and Ruskinian leanings." It was redeveloped in the late 1990s when the three top floors of the building were converted into 14 apartments. The National Wax Museum Plus has occupied the ground floor since 2017.
