= Jennie Shanahan =

Member of the Irish Citizen Army

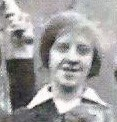
- Born: Jane Shanahan; 1897
- Died: 29 December 1936
- Known for: Unionism and Republicanism

Jennie Shanahan (1897 – 29 December 1936), was a member of the Irish Citizen Army and fought in the Easter Rising and the Irish War of Independence.

== Life and activism ==
Born to Mr and Mrs Michael Shanahan in 1897, Jane was better known as Jennie or Jinny. Her family had lived in a one-room tenement in Mercer Street. She came from a large family but five of her brothers and sisters died young. She got a job working at the Jacob's Biscuit Factory. She was an active leader of the Irish Women Workers' Union and caught up in the Lock out.

She joined the Irish Citizen Army in 1913 where women were treated as more equals than was typical for the time and as a result she took part in army manoeuvres and recruit training. When the Easter Rising occurred she had been manager of the co-operative shop in Liberty Hall. As a soldier in the ICA, she was sent to take Dublin Castle under the command of Sean Connolly.

The attempt failed and they returned to City Hall which they held for the next day. On the roof of the building she saw the death of her commander to sniper fire. A story given was that she met British soldiers on the way back from Dublin Castle to City Hall and they assumed she was a captive civilian. Then they asked if she was alright and for what information she could give them about the rebels. She replied that while they had treated her well enough, there were hundreds of them up on the roof. The British soldiers advanced more slowly, despite having made headway already and this gave the garrison time to get into place.

Shanahan was one of the women arrested at imprisoned in the Ship Street Barracks. She was later transferred to Richmond Barracks and then to Kilmainham Gaol. She was released on 8 May 1916 after which she continued to support the Irish Volunteers. On 12 May 1917 she and Rosie Hackett, Helena Molony, Brigid Davis locked themselves into the remains of Liberty Hall and hung a banner from the walls declaring "James Connolly murdered 12th May 1916". They worked endlessly to ensure the story of 1916 did not merely drift into song. During the War of Independence Shanahan had to work to avoid further arrests by the authorities for hiding guns and dispatches. She ran a hospital in Cullenswood House where St Enda's was originally homed.

After Shanahan's death in 1936, Helena Molony delivered the oration at her grave. She was buried in Glasnevin Cemetery, Dublin.

The musician Damien Dempsey has stated that Shanahan is an aunt of his, and that her politics influences his own.
