= Willie Bermingham =

Irish activist and firefighter

- Born: 29 March 1942; Dublin, Ireland
- Died: 23 April 1990 (aged 48)
- Occupation(s): Firefighter, charity worker
- Known for: Founder of the charity ALONE

William Patrick (Willie) Bermingham (29 March 1942 – 23 April 1990) was an Irish firefighter and campaigner, who founded ALONE ("A Little Offering Never Ends"), an organisation highlighting the plight of old people living alone.

== Early life ==
Bermingham was born in the Rotunda Hospital, Dublin, and grew up in The Puc, Inchicore, before moving to The Nurseries in Bluebell, where the family had a scrap yard. His father William (Bill) Bermingham and mother Mary (née Dalgarno) reared a family of 3 boys and 4 girls. Bermingham attended St Michael's School, Inchicore, followed by Capel St. Technical School, Dublin.

== Career and activism ==
Bermingham had several jobs before joining Dublin Fire Brigade in 1964, members of which also provide Dublin's emergency ambulance service. He served with them until his death.

In 1977, Bermingham founded ALONE ("A Little Offering Never Ends"), an organisation highlighting the plight of older and forgotten individuals, sometimes living in squalid neglect, in Dublin. This was after he had found several people dead in appalling conditions through his work as a firefighter. His earliest action was to produce and distribute posters across the city, "Old people die alone". He also wrote Alone: an account of some old people discovered in Dublin in 1978 (with Liam Ó Cuanaigh) (1978), Alone again (1982) and Alone once more (1989).

He worked on a voluntary basis for ALONE whilst continuing to work in Dublin Fire Brigade. He personally visited 3,500 elderly people and lobbied vigorously for more coordination of policies relating to the elderly. Many colleagues came on board as volunteers, and as news spread of the work, the organisation grew. Whilst it became a relatively large organisation, the focus on people as individuals never changed. The operation was run from the family home in Bluebell, and the office only moved from the sitting room after he died. The charity constructed two sets of houses for elderly people, at Brookfield Avenue, Artane (1986) and at Kilmainham Lane, Dublin (1991), and purchased a plot at Glasnevin Cemetery (1988).

ALONE remains an active charity in Ireland.

== Personal life ==
In 1972 he married Mary (Marie) Kelly, a Roscommon woman whose family had moved to Chapelizod and later Lucan. They spent their 18 years of marriage living in Bluebell where they reared 2 daughters and 3 sons.

Bermingham suddenly became ill in late February 1990; he died from cancer on 23 April 1990 in Dublin. His funeral was held at St Patrick's Cathedral, Dublin. He is buried at St Mary's cemetery, Lucan, Dublin.

== Recognition and legacy ==
Bermingham received a People of the Year award in 1979, and in 1985 he was awarded the International Firefighter of the Year award. In 1988, he was awarded an Honorary Doctorate of Law by Trinity College Dublin. One of ALONE's housing units is named in his honour and the charity has also awarded the Willie Bermingham Medal.
