= Robert Sorley Lawrie =

Scottish architect

- Born: 27 June 1903
- Died: 23 May 1977 (aged 73)
- Occupation: Architect
- Practice: Dublin Corporation
- Buildings: Inchicore Public Library; Ringsend Public Library; Phibsborough Public Library; Drumcondra Public Library

Robert Sorley Lawrie (27 June 1903 – 23 May 1977) was a Scottish architect who worked in the department of the Dublin City Architect Horace Tennyson O'Rourke.

== Early years and education ==
He was probably a son of Robert Lawrie, a plumber, of 12 Claremont Street, Aberdeen, and his wife Jennie Robb. He studied architecture at Robert Gordon's College from September 1919 to June 1921 then was a pupil of George Bennett Mitchell in Aberdeen until September 1924. He returned to Robert Gordon's College for the post-diploma course, which he completed in June 1925.

== Career ==
He and Herbert George Simms were appointed assistant architects to the Dublin City Commissioners in June 1929. He was responsible for most of the work of converting Charlemont House to the Municipal Gallery in 1933. He designed the Inchicore Public Library in 1937 and was responsible for ones in Ringsend, Phibsborough and Drumcondra, all built the same year.

He was living in Dublin in 1945 but had left by 1947, taking up the post of County Architect for Fife.

== Personal life ==
He married Anne Dempster McDowall on 1 June 1933. She survived him.
