= Inchicore Public Library =

Public library in Dublin, Ireland

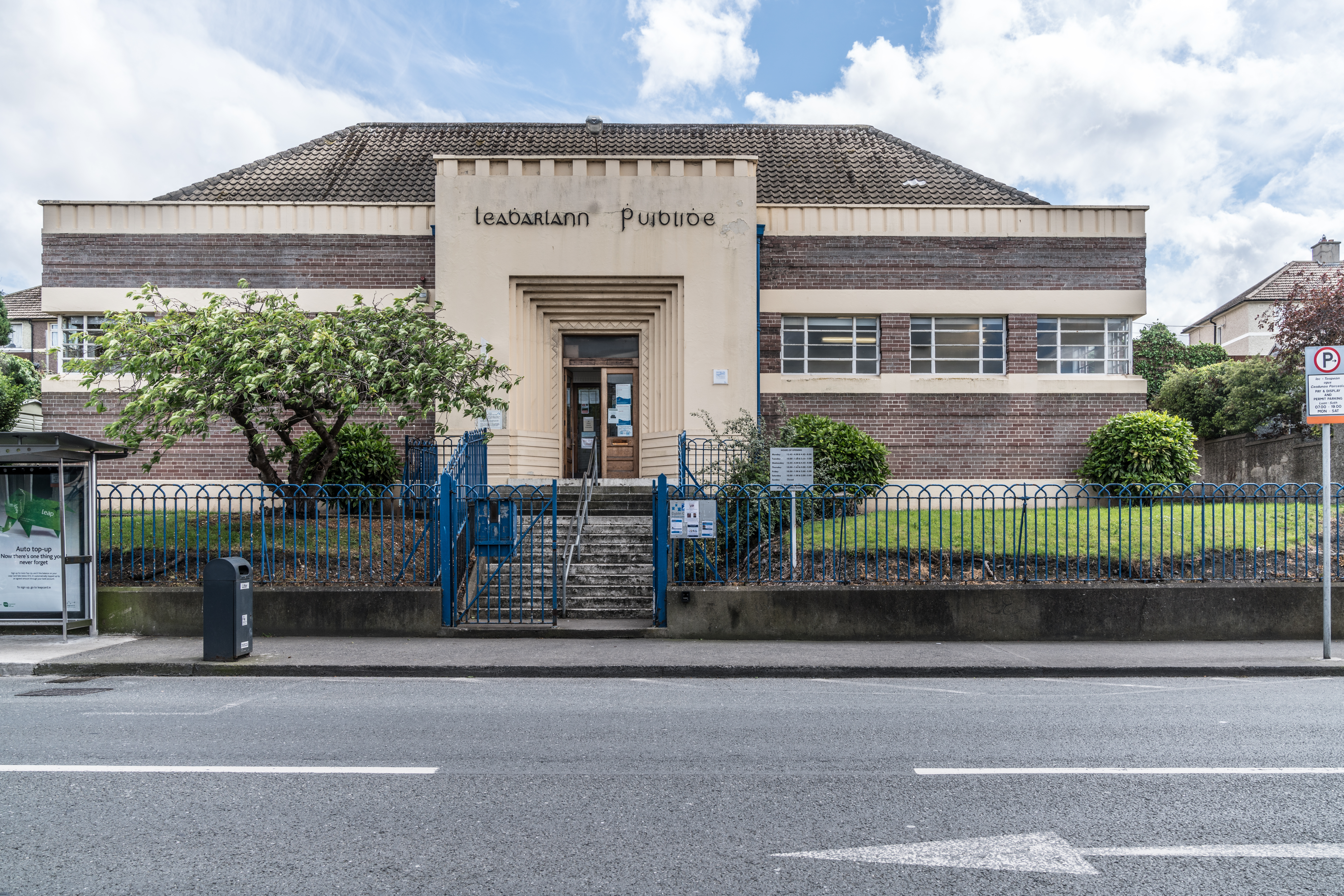
- 53.34033°N 6.30980°W
- Established: 1937
- Closed: 2020 (operating from temporary premises in Richmond Barracks)
- Architect: Robert Sorley Lawrie
- Parent organization: Dublin City Libraries

Inchicore Public Library is an art deco style public library in Inchicore, Dublin designed by Robert Sorley Lawrie working in the city architect's office under Horace O'Rourke.

The library building is one of four similar libraries built by Dublin Corporation between 1935 and 1940 in the Dublin suburbs of Phibsborough, Ringsend, Drumcondra and Inchicore. It is included in the Record of Protected Structures maintained by Dublin City Council.

The building closed in 2020, initially for planned refurbishment works, with Inchicore's public library operating from temporary premises on the grounds of the former Richmond Barracks. While unoccupied, a pipe in the building burst in December 2022, causing significant damage. As of late 2025, the art deco building remained closed and the refurbishment works incomplete. While Dublin City Council suggested that the building could reopen in early 2027, there were no specific decisions on "what it will be used for".

== See also ==
- Ringsend Public Library
- Drumcondra Public Library
- Phibsborough Public Library
- List of libraries in the Republic of Ireland
