= Drumcondra Public Library =

Public library in Dublin, Ireland

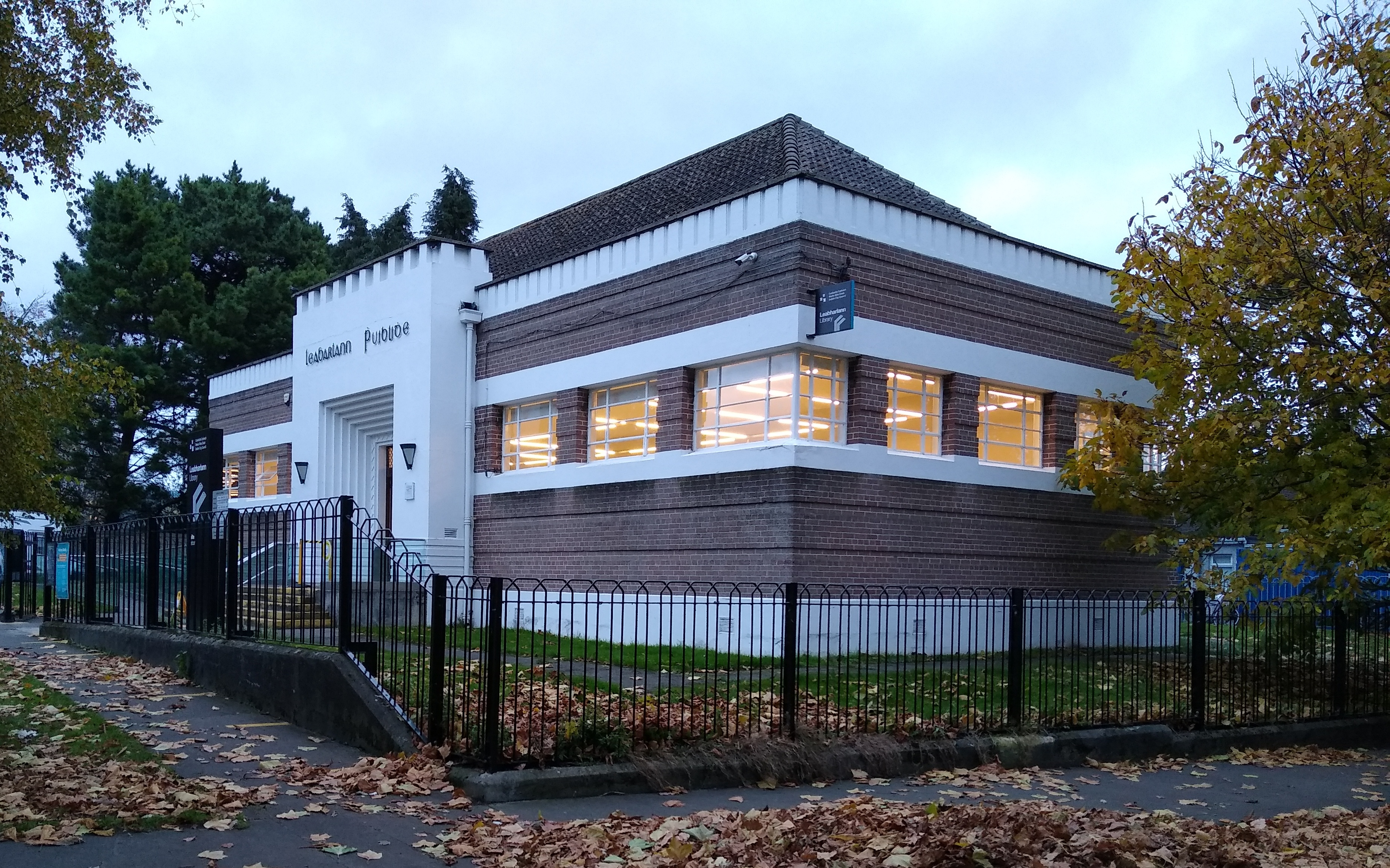
- 53.36984°N 6.25904°W
- Architect: Robert Sorley Lawrie

Other information
- Parent organization: Dublin City Libraries
- Website: www.dublincity.ie/drumcondra-library

Drumcondra Public Library is an art deco style public library in Drumcondra, Dublin designed by Robert Sorley Lawrie working in the city architect's office under Horace O'Rourke.

The library building was one of four similar libraries built by Dublin Corporation between 1935 and 1940 in the Dublin suburbs of Phibsborough, Ringsend, Drumcondra and Inchicore.

== See also ==
- Ringsend Public Library
- Inchicore Public Library
- Phibsborough Public Library
- List of libraries in the Republic of Ireland
