= Ringsend Public Library =

Public library in Dublin, Ireland

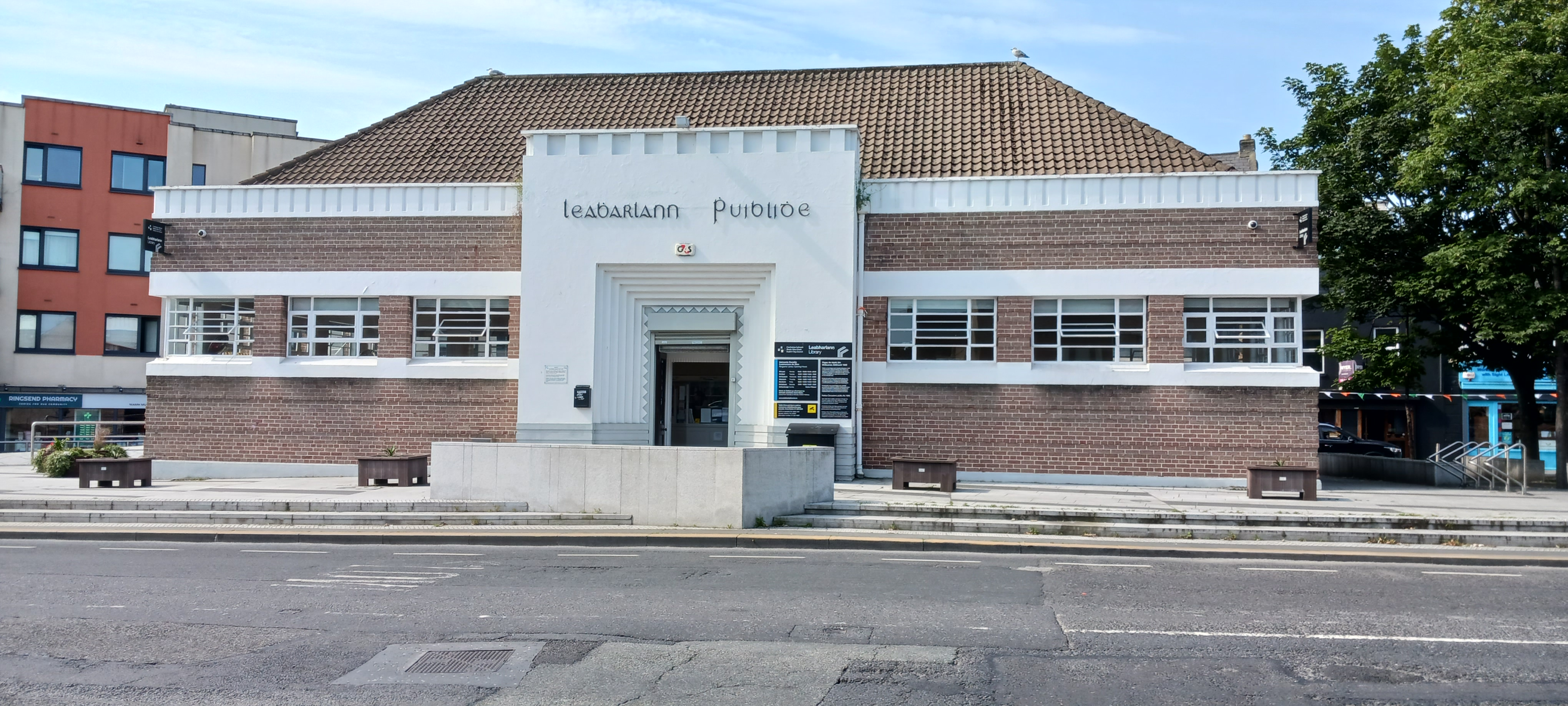
- The public library in Ringsend, Dublin.
- 53.34149°N 6.22642°W
- Established: 1937; 89 years ago
- Architect: Robert Sorley Lawrie

Other information
- Parent organization: Dublin City Public Libraries and Archive
- Website: www.dublincity.ie/ringsend-library

Ringsend Public Library is an art deco style public library in Ringsend, Dublin designed by Robert Sorley Lawrie working in the city architect's office under Horace O'Rourke.

The building, opened in October 1937, is one of four similar libraries built by Dublin Corporation between 1935 and 1940 in the Dublin suburbs of Phibsborough, Ringsend, Drumcondra and Inchicore.

== See also ==
- Drumcondra Public Library
- Inchicore Public Library
- Phibsborough Public Library
- List of libraries in the Republic of Ireland
