= Phibsborough Public Library =

Public library in Dublin, Ireland

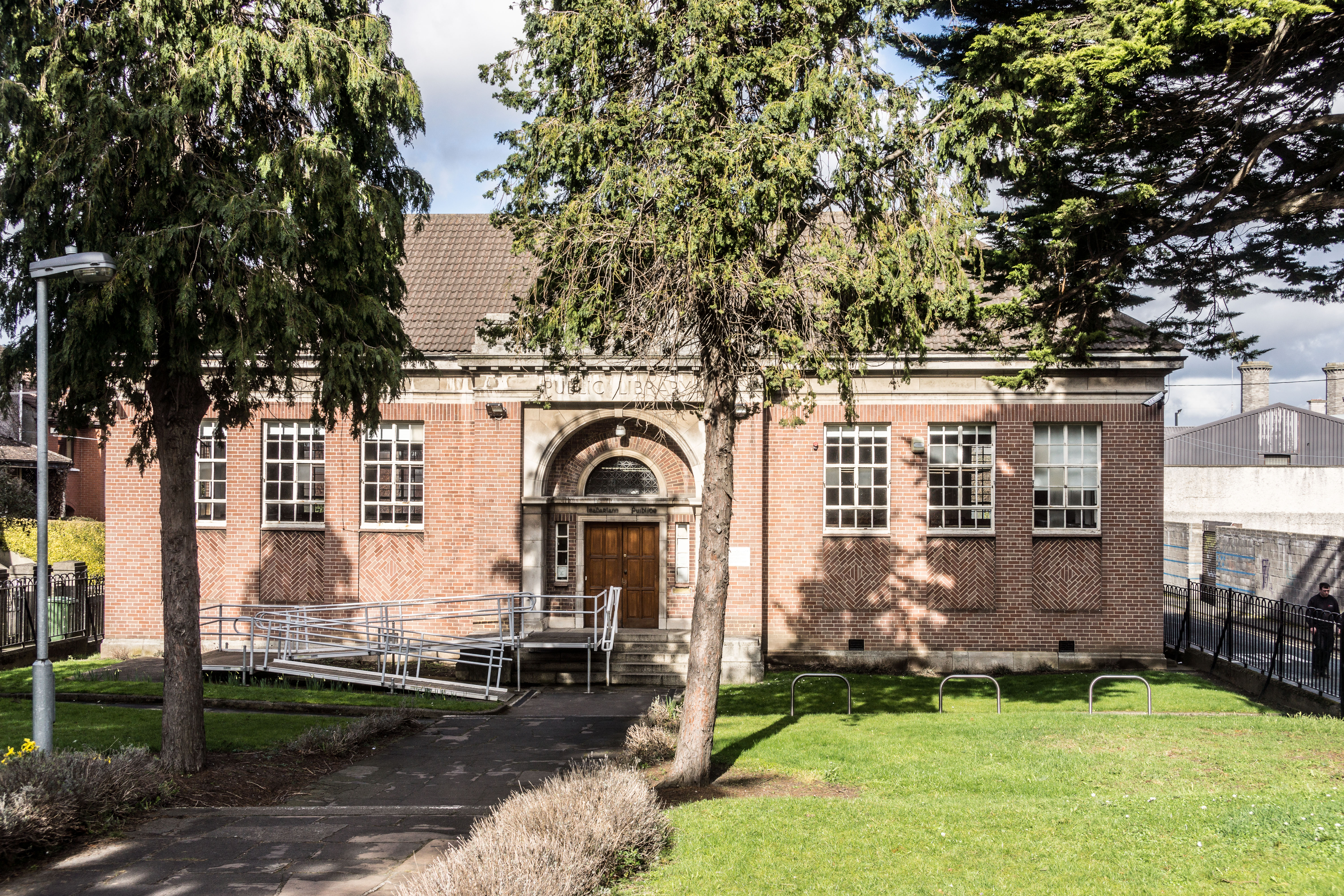
- 53.36111°N 6.27097°W
- Established: 1930s
- Architect: Robert Sorley Lawrie

Other information
- Parent organization: Dublin City Libraries
- Website: www.dublincity.ie/phibsboro-library

Phibsborough Public Library is an art deco and Georgian style public library in Phibsborough, Dublin. It is included in the Record of Protected Structures maintained by Dublin City Council.

Completed in 1934, the building was designed by Robert Sorley Lawrie who was working in the city architect's office under Horace O'Rourke. It is the earliest of four similar libraries built in the 1930s by Dublin Corporation within the Dublin suburbs of Phibsborough, Ringsend, Drumcondra and Inchicore.

== See also ==
- Drumcondra Public Library
- Inchicore Public Library
- Ringsend Public Library
- List of libraries in the Republic of Ireland
