= Richmond Barracks =

- Bulfin Road, Inchicore, Dublin
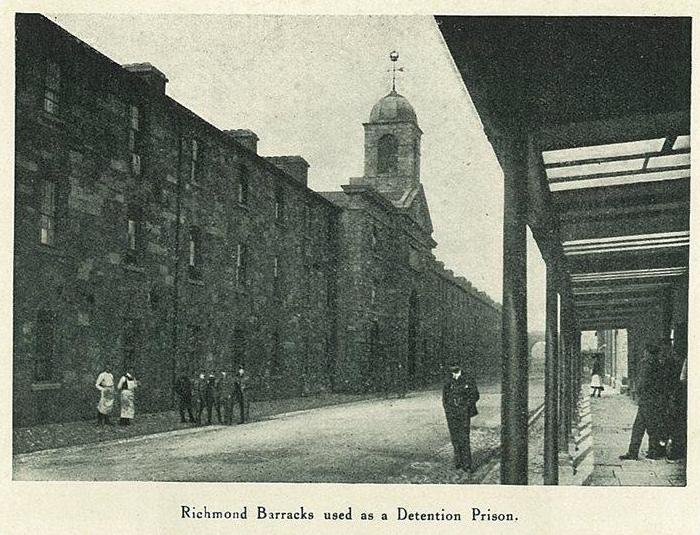
- Richmond Barracks

Site information
- Type: Barracks
- Operator: (United Kingdom) British Army (1814–1922) (Republic of Ireland) National Army (1922)

Location
- Location within Dublin
- Coordinates: 53.338537°N 6.316177°W

Site history
- Built: 1810
- Built for: War Office
- In use: 1814–1922

Garrison information
- Garrison: Argyll and Sutherland Highlanders; Queen's Own Royal West Kent Regiment; 13th (1st Somersetshire) (Prince Albert's Light Infantry) Regiment of Foot; Royal Irish Regiment

Richmond Barracks Exhibition Centre
- Dún Richmond

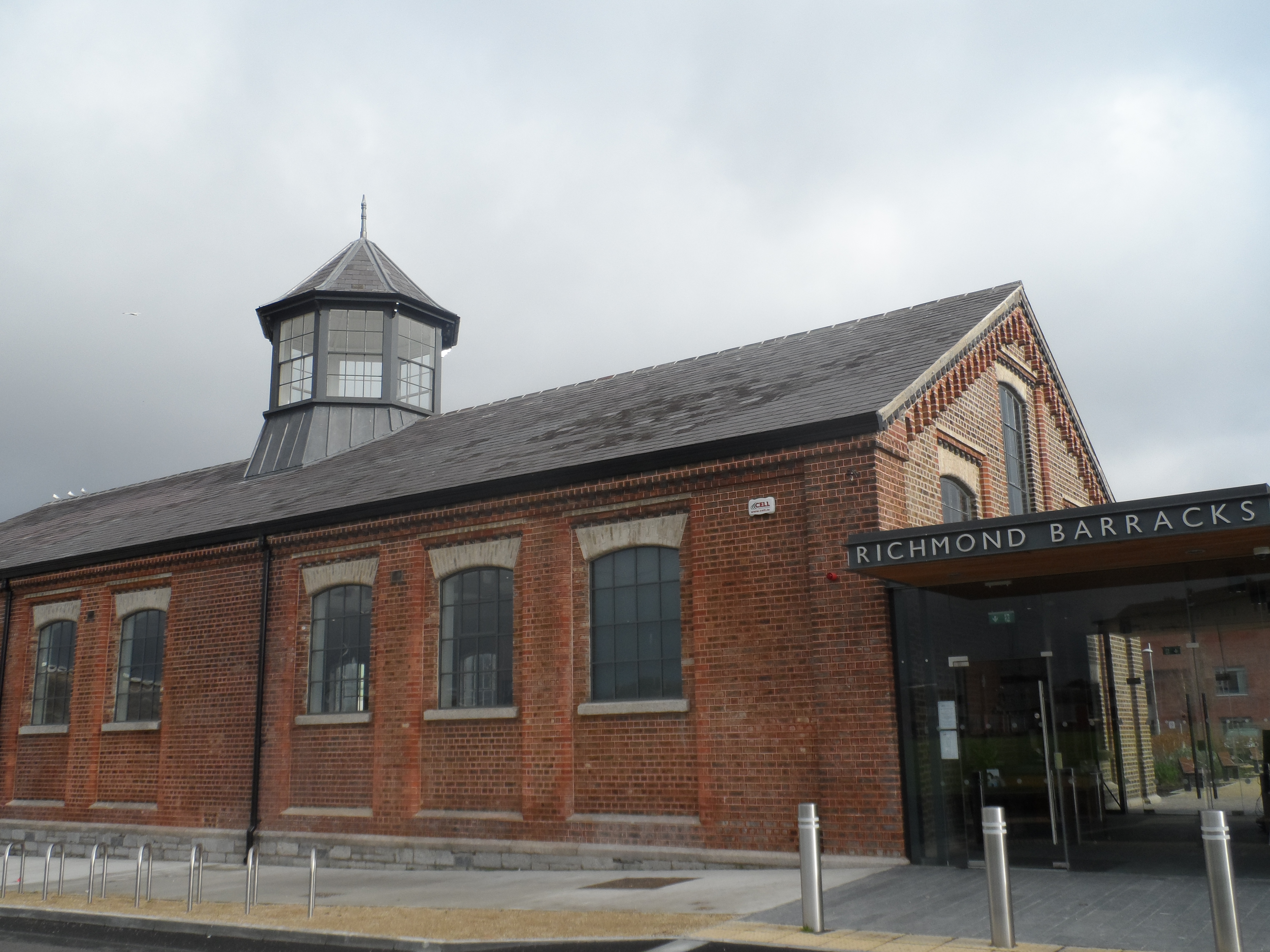
- Former name: Keogh Barracks
- Established: 1 May 2016
- Type: Military Museum, Local museum
- Chairperson: Éadaoin Ní Chléirigh (Executive Chair)
- Architect: Blackwood Associates with Margaret Quinlan Architects
- Public transit access: Drimnagh; St Michaels Church (Dublin Bus routes 13, 40, 68)
- Parking: on site
- Website: richmondbarracks.ie

Richmond Barracks was a British Army barracks in Inchicore, Dublin, Ireland. It is now a cultural centre.

== History ==
The barracks, which were named after Charles Lennox, 4th Duke of Richmond, were completed in 1810 and first occupied by the British Army in 1814.

Many Irishmen were stationed there before going overseas to fight in the First World War. During the First World War the barracks also served as the 2nd cavalry depot providing accommodation for the 4th Queen's Own Hussars, the 8th King's Royal Irish Hussars, the 11th Hussars and the 13th Hussars.

Deputy Michael Conaghan of the Inchicore Kilmainham Heritage Group has said, "The remaining buildings of Richmond Barracks here have very specific connections to the Easter Rising and its immediate aftermath. After the surrender, it was designated by the British as the holding centre for over 3,000 suspected rebels, until they were released or sent to prison camps in England, Wales and Northern Ireland... The signatories of the Proclamation (with the exception of James Connolly) and other leaders were also interned, court-martialed and sentenced to death in the barracks before they were sent to Kilmainham Gaol for execution." The Prime Minister H. H. Asquith visited on 12 May 1916, after which no further executions of prisoners took place.

After the Irish Free State was founded in 1922, the barracks was occupied by the Irish Army, and briefly named "Keogh Barracks", after Commander Tom Keogh who fought in the War of Independence. The Irish government closed the barracks in 1922.

The building came into possession of the Dublin Corporation and was used to house Dublin families who were on the housing list; they built Keogh Square, which was demolished in 1970, and this was replaced by St. Michaels Estate on the same site. At the same time as the transfer of the barracks to the corporation, Christian Brothers purchased three of the buildings and turned two of them into class rooms and called it "St Michaels Christian Brothers School", a national school opening in 1929. President Mary Robinson visited the school in October 1996. It closed down in 2006.

== Redevelopment ==
In May 2016, as part of the centenary celebrations of the Easter Rising, Richmond Barracks reopened as a visitor attraction, incorporating nearby Goldenbridge Cemetery.

Since 2020, a building in the former barracks has housed a branch of Dublin City Libraries, when the nearby art deco Inchicore Public Library building was closed for refurbishment.

== See also ==
- List of Irish military installations
