= Chislehurst School for Girls =

Location
- Beaverwood Road; Chislehurst, Greater London, BR7 6HE; England; 51.418617°N 0.089186°E

Information
- Type: Academy
- Motto: Altiora Sequamur
- Established: 1896; 130 years ago
- Department for Education URN: 136467 Tables
- Ofsted: Reports
- Head teacher: Maria French
- Gender: Girls
- Age: 11 to 18
- Enrolment: 1235
- Houses: Angelou, Cabrera, Turing, Yousafzai
- Colours: Navy blue, Green and Black
- Website: https://www.chislehurstschoolforgirls.co.uk/

Chislehurst School for Girls is a secondary school in Chislehurst, in outer South East London, England. It caters for girls in academic years 7-11 and offers a co-educational sixth form education.

== History ==
Chilslehurst school was founded in 1896 as Sidcup High School, then a co-educational school located on the corner of Victoria Road. Sidcup High School became Sidcup County School for Girls before moving to the new purpose-built main school building in 1931. This site was expanded twice during the 1950s. After World War II, the school became Chislehurst and Sidcup County Grammar School for Girls and in the 1950s Chislehurst and Sidcup Girls' Grammar School with the initials CSGGS on the blazer badge. Chislehurst and Sidcup Girls’ Grammar School was the girls' counterpart to the formerly all-boys Chislehurst and Sidcup Grammar School, which has since moved to the London Borough of Bexley and became a coeducational selective academy. As the school was sited in Beaverwood Road the beaver was adopted as an appropriate symbol of industry and featured on the prefects' badges. In 1968 the school was renamed Beaverwood School for Girls. In 1982 the school changed from being a grammar school to a comprehensive school. The school gained academy status on 1 March 2011. In September 2014, Beaverwood changed its name to Chislehurst School for Girls.

== Houses ==
In the school there are 4 houses: Angelou, Yousafzai, Turing and Cabrera. The houses are paired with charities which they must fundraise for. The more money raised equals more house points.

== Notable former pupils ==
- Danielle Murphy, footballer
- Dionne Bromfield, singer

=== Chislehurst and Sidcup Girls' Grammar School ===
- Lindsey Bareham, cookery writer
- Margaret Gelling OBE, toponymist
- Lynne Miller, actress
- Betty Moys who started the Moys Classification Scheme of legal literature
