= The Gospel of Wealth =

1889 article by Andrew Carnegie

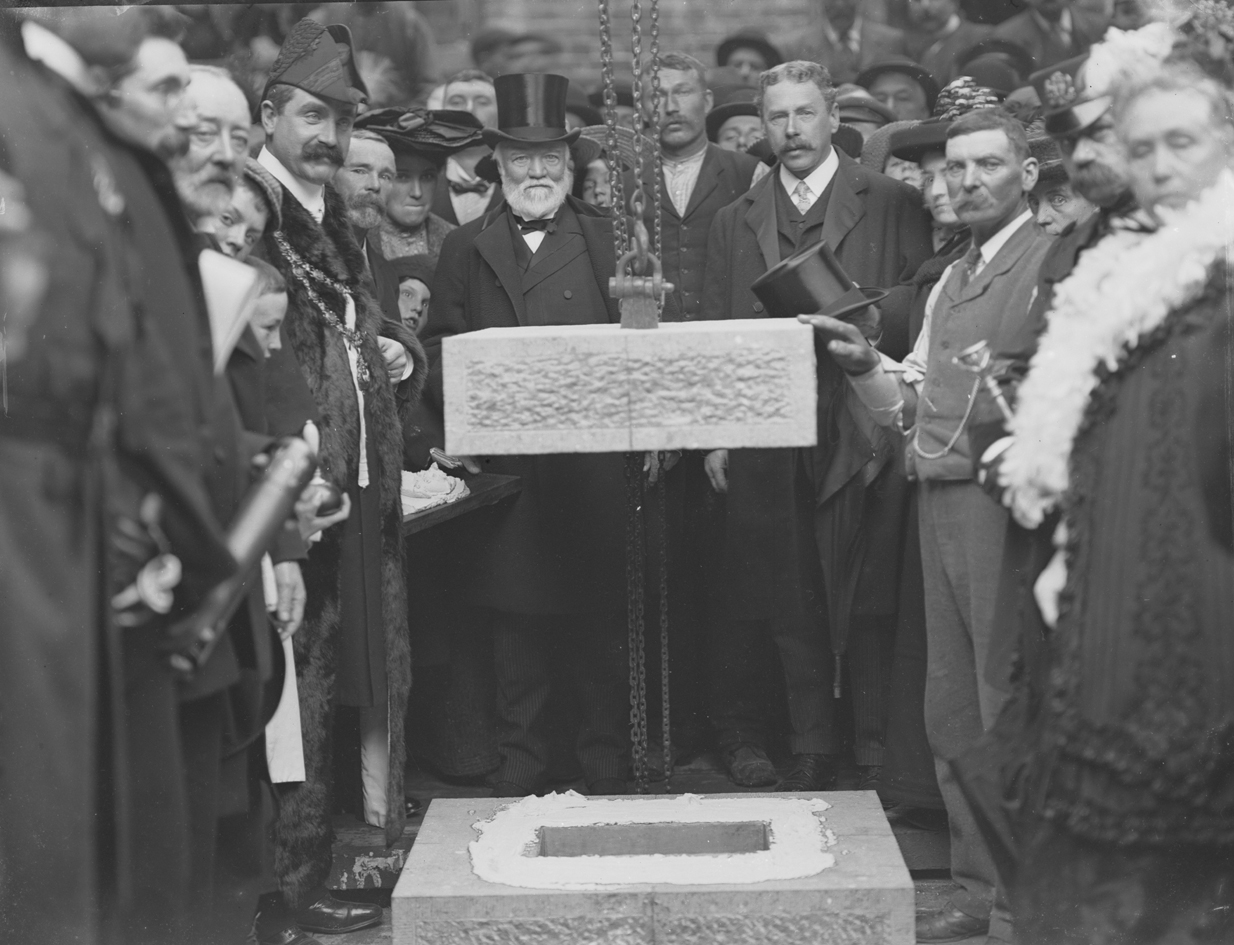
Andrew Carnegie (center-left, hatted) dedicating the Waterford Free Library, which he sponsored, in 1903.

"Wealth", more commonly known as "The Gospel of Wealth", is an essay written by Andrew Carnegie in June 1889 that describes the responsibility of philanthropy by the new upper class of self-made rich. The article was published in the North American Review, an opinion magazine for America's establishment. It was later published as "The Gospel of Wealth" in The Pall Mall Gazette.

Carnegie proposes that the best way to address the new phenomenon of wealth inequality is for the wealthy to use their surplus means responsibly and thoughtfully (similar to the concept of noblesse oblige). This approach is contrasted with traditional bequest (patrimony), in which wealth is handed down to heirs, and with other forms of bequest, e.g., where wealth is willed to the state for public purposes. Benjamin Soskis, a historian of philanthropy, refers to the article as the 'urtext' of modern philanthropy.

Carnegie argues that surplus wealth is put to best use (i.e., produces the greatest net benefit to society) when it is administered carefully by the wealthy. Carnegie also argues against the wasteful use of capital in the form of extravagance, irresponsible spending, or self-indulgence, instead promoting the administration of this capital over the course of one's lifetime toward reducing the stratification between the rich and the poor. As a result, the wealthy should administer their riches responsibly and not in a way that encourages "the slothful, the drunken, the unworthy".

At age 35, Carnegie decided to limit his personal wealth and donate the surplus to benevolent causes. He was determined to be remembered for his good deeds rather than his wealth. He became a "radical" philanthropist. Before publishing his ideas about wealth, he began donating to his favorite causes, starting by donating a public bath to his hometown of Dunfermline. As Carnegie tried to live his life in such a way that the poor could benefit from his wealth, he decided he needed to share his ideas with the public.

== Assertions ==
"The Gospel of Wealth" asserts that hard work and perseverance lead to wealth.

Carnegie bases his philosophy on the observation that the heirs of large fortunes frequently squander them in riotous living rather than nurturing and growing them. Even bequeathing one's fortune to a charity was no guarantee that it would be used wisely, because there was no guarantee that a charitable organization not under one's direction would use the money in accordance with one's wishes. Carnegie disapproves of charitable giving that keeps people in poverty and urges a shift toward a new mode of giving that creates opportunities for beneficiaries to better themselves. As a result, the gift would not simply be consumed but would generate even greater wealth throughout society.

In "The Gospel of Wealth", Carnegie examines the modes of distributing accumulated wealth and capital to the communities from which they originate. He preaches that ostentatious living and amassing private treasures are wrong. He praises the high British taxes on the estates of dead millionaires, remarking "By taxing estates heavily at death the State marks its condemnation of the selfish millionaire's unworthy life. It is desirable that nations should go much further in this direction."

Carnegie makes it clear that the duty of the rich is to live modest lifestyles, and that any surplus of money they have is best suited for re-circulation back into society where it could be used to support the greater good. He shuns aristocratic chains of inheritance and argues that dependents should be supported by their work with major moderation, with the bulk of excess wealth to be spent on enriching the community. In cases where excess wealth is held until death, he advocates its apprehension by the state on a progressive scale: "Indeed, it is difficult to set bounds to the share of a rich man's estates which should go at his death to the public through the agency of the State, and by all means such taxes should be granted, beginning at nothing upon moderate sums to dependents, and increasing rapidly as the amounts swell, until of the millionaire's hoard, at least the other half comes to the privy coffer of the State."

== Reception ==
When Carnegie Steel Company broke the union in 1892, Carnegie avoided blame by focusing on his new doctrine for the wealthy. The Homestead Strike ended in a showdown between 300 Pinkerton guards and a crowd of steel workers and supporters, which devolved into an exchange of gunfire. This outbreak left seven workers and three guards dead, and many more wounded. It made headlines around the world, and reporters reached Carnegie, who was in Scotland at the time. When questioned, Carnegie called the violence "deplorable" but otherwise pleaded ignorance, stating, "I have given up all active control of the business." Subsequently, he began to focus on his philanthropic work and teaching the Gospel of Wealth. Largely as a result of his philanthropic work, the Homestead Strike did little to mar his reputation.

Carnegie's controversial views on wealth sparked a trans-Atlantic debate that argued the nature, purpose, and disposition of wealth.

=== William Ewart Gladstone ===
William Ewart Gladstone, the head of the Liberal Party in England and a friend of Carnegie's, had some sharp remarks on the publication. Even though they were close friends and had similar political ideals, Gladstone did not agree with Carnegie's paper. Gladstone defended primogeniture, unlimited inheritance, and the British aristocracy. This led to many other critics joining Gladstone in denouncing Carnegie's "radical" philanthropic ways.

These critical reviews led Carnegie to publish a series of essays in which he defended himself. He defends individualism, private property, and the accumulation of personal wealth because they benefit the human race in the long run. In an effort to convince his critics that he was not saying everyone should get free handouts from the upper class, he edited his original doctrine so that it reads, "Help those who will help themselves, to provide part of the means by which those who desire to improve may do so." Since many interpreted his writing as meaning that all those in poverty should be assisted by the wealthy, Carnegie needed to clarify that charity has its limits.

=== Phoebe Apperson Hearst ===
In 1901, U.S. Senator Jonathan Prentiss Dolliver wrote an article for the celebrity magazine Success, titled "Phoebe Apperson Hearst and the New Gospel of Wealth". Hearst was an American philanthropist and suffragist. According to Dolliver, Hearst saw inadequacies of public schools and was concerned about urban poverty and vice. She, like Carnegie, believed that as a millionaire it was her duty to help those less fortunate. The purpose of Dolliver's article was to explain Hearst's "Gospel of Wealth" and illustrate how she should be viewed as a complementary equal to men like Carnegie. She declared that wealthy women had a sacred and moral duty to give away their fortunes to causes, especially progressive education and reform, to benefit their communities. Like Carnegie, Hearst was very concerned with allowing the lower class to be educated at the same level at which the upper class was educated. Also like Carnegie, she established her own free public library, located in Anaconda, Montana.

== Impact on philanthropy ==
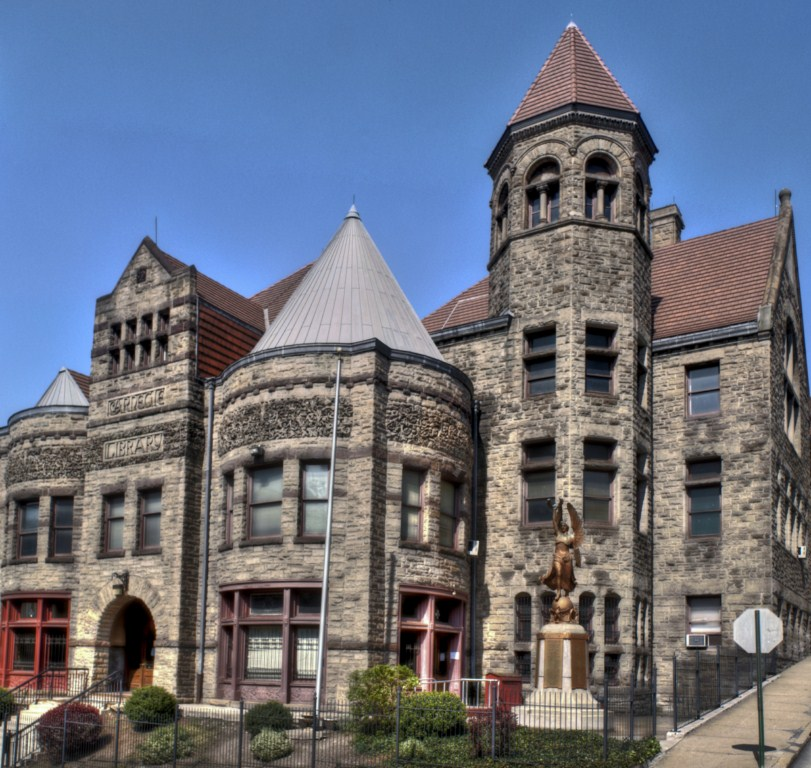
Carnegie Free Library of Braddock in Braddock, Pennsylvania, built in 1888, was the first Carnegie Library in the United States.

The article launched the modern philanthropic movement. Carnegie put his philosophy into practice through a program of donations to endow public libraries, known as 'Carnegie libraries' in cities and towns throughout the United States and the English-speaking world, with the idea that he was thus providing people with the tools to better themselves. He stipulated that the municipality must pass an ordinance establishing a tax to support the library's ongoing operating costs after the initial grant provided the costs for building and equipping the library. Each of these organizations had its own endowment and its own board of trustees. Many of them still exist today.

After several communities used their grants to build extravagant buildings, Carnegie established a system of guidelines mandating simplicity and functionality. He established the Carnegie Corporation to continue his program of giving after his death.

== See also ==
- Effective altruism
- The Giving Pledge
- Gospel of success
