= List of libraries in the Republic of Ireland =

This is a list of libraries in the Republic of Ireland.

== Libraries by province ==
=== Connacht ===
- Galway City Library
- James Hardiman Library, University of Galway
- Mayo County Library
- Roscommon County Library

=== Leinster ===
==== Dublin ====
- Central Catholic Library, Dublin
- Chester Beatty Library, Dublin Castle
- Dublin Business School Library
- Dublin City Libraries
- Drumcondra Public Library, Dublin
- Inchicore Public Library, Dublin
- Marsh's Library, St. Patrick's Close, Dublin
- National Irish Visual Arts Library, Dublin
- National Library of Ireland, Dublin
- Oireachtas Library, Dublin
- Phibsborough Public Library, Dublin
- Ringsend Public Library, Dublin
- Royal College of Surgeons in Ireland Library, Dublin
- Royal Irish Academy Library, Dublin
- Technological University Dublin Library
- Trinity College
  - Library of Trinity College Dublin
  - The Old Library, Trinity College Dublin
- University College Dublin Library

==== Elsewhere ====
- Carlow County Library
- Drogheda Library
- Maynooth University Library
- Meath County Library
- Offaly County Library
- Russell Library (St Patrick's College), Maynooth

=== Munster ===
- Bolton Library, County Tipperary
- Cork City Library
- Cork Library Society, est.1792
- Midleton Library
- Tipperary County Libraries
- Waterford City Library
- University College Cork, Boole Library
- University of Limerick, Glucksman Library

=== Ulster ===
- Donegal Central Library
- Letterkenny Library and Arts Centre

== See also ==
- Agency for the Legal Deposit Libraries
- British and Irish Association of Law Librarians
- Copyright law of Ireland
- Irish literature
- Library Association of Ireland
- List of medical libraries: Ireland
- Open access in Ireland
- Public Libraries (Ireland) Act 1902
