= Eagle in the Snow =

1970 historical fiction novel by Wallace Breem

- Author: Wallace Breem
- Publisher: Gollancz (UK) Putnam (US)
- Publication date: 1970
- Pages: 326

Eagle in the Snow (ISBN 1-59071-011-8) is a 1970 historical fiction novel written by Wallace Breem, which was reprinted in 2003 following the success of the film Gladiator. A commercial success, the critically acclaimed novel is Breem's best known work.

The story revolves around the fictional Roman general Paulinus Gaius Maximus. He is a Mithraist in an age of Christianization, in Britannia and Germania, between the late 4th century and the early 5th century.

== Reception ==
A review in the journal Archaeology recommended Eagle in the Snow as "a good place to start for anyone who wants to imagine life at the time Rome was starting to collapse". While acknowledging its flaws, reviewer Fred Mench praised the "great battle scenes" and the "likable, honorable narrator".

== Plot summary ==
During the waning days of the Roman Empire, commander Maximus and his friend Quintus have been commanding the defence of Hadrian's Wall against the Picts and other tribes, who unite under the guidance of Maximus's archenemy, when the news of an impending Germanic invasion across the Rhine breaks.

After being promoted to 'General of the West' and his wife's death, Maximus is sent to Moguntiacum (modern-day Mainz in Germany) where he is assigned to defend the entire 820-mile border between Gaul and Germania with just one legion, the XX.

Realising the near impossible task, Maximus decides that he and his legion of 6,000 men can succeed by laying out a series of military forts along the west bank of the Rhine to prevent six Germanic nations – 250,000 people – from invading Gaul. After the crossing of the Rhine by a mixed group of Barbarians that included Vandals, Alans, and Suebi, Maximus gains an unlikely ally in Goar, who led a band of Alans into Gaul and then quickly joined the Romans.

As Maximus carries out his duties on the border, he battles against a corrupt bureaucracy in the Roman Empire that denies every request he makes that could assist his Rhine campaign.

He also, under the growing pressures from his allies—including his former enemies— who want him to seize the Western Emperorship for himself, finds himself fighting for a dying empire against Christianity that condemns his traditional pagan beliefs.
