= Wallace Breem =

British librarian and author

Wallace Wilfred Swinburne Breem (13 May 1926 – 12 March 1990) was a British librarian and author.

He was the Librarian and Keeper of Manuscripts of the Inner Temple Law Library. His writing included non-fiction pieces, but he is probably best known for his three historical novels, especially Eagle in the Snow (1970).

== Career ==
Breem was born in Kingston, Surrey and was educated at Westminster School.

At the age of 18, he entered the Indian Army's Officers Training School. In 1945 he was commissioned as an officer of the Guides Cavalry, the elite cavalry regiment, serving on the North West Frontier in armoured cars.

In 1947, following the Partition of India, Breem returned to England and held a variety of jobs, which included: a labourer in a tannery, an assistant to a veterinary surgeon, and a rent-collector in the East End of London. He joined the library staff of the Inner Temple, in London, in 1950.

Breem was a founder member of BIALL (British and Irish Association of Law Librarians), and at various times held the offices of: secretary, treasurer, chairman, vice-president, and president in that organization.

== Bibliography ==
Novels

- Eagle in the Snow (Gollancz 1970, Sphere 1971), republished 2002, 2003, 2004.
- The Legate’s Daughter (Arrow Books 1975), republished 2004.
- The Leopard and the Cliff (St. Martin's Press 1978). Republished by Faber and Faber in 2010 under the Faber Finds imprint.

Non-fiction

Breem's academic writing includes various papers, reports, articles, and Standards, especially for the Manual of Law Librarianship and the New Cambridge Bibliography of English Literature, in addition to:

- A Sketch of the Inner Temple Library
- Bibliography of Commonwealth Law Reports (with Sally Phillips, Mansell 1991)

== Legacy ==
In 1990, BIALL inaugurated the Wallace Breem Award in his memory.
