= The Coroner's Daughter =

Historical fiction novel

The Coroner's daughter
- Author: Andrew Hughes
- Language: English
- Genre: Historical fiction
- Published: 2018
- ISBN: 978-1-78162-021-2

The Coroner's Daughter is the second novel by author Andrew Hughes.

== Plot summary ==
The plot of the novel centres on Abigail Lawless, the daughter of a city coroner, as she attempts to discover who is responsible for a murder. The novel is set in 1816 (the Year Without a Summer) in Dublin. As Abigail seeks to find her killer she moves through Dublin city and its surroundings and visits historic sites such as the Royal Irish Academy, Dunsink Observatory, Charlemont House, and Blessington Street Basin. The novel has both fictional and real historic figures such as James Caulfield, 1st Earl of Charlemont.

== One City One Book ==
In October 2022 Dublin UNESCO City of Literature announced that the book had been chosen for the One City One Book for 2023. When it was announced for the One City One book series Dublin City Librarian, Mairead Owens, said "The Coroner’s Daughter is a story rooted in Dublin city of the early 19th Century with fascinating themes such as forensic science, religion, and the role of women in Ireland at the time. It is also an entertaining detective story, which I’m sure will engage the readers of Dublin and beyond."
