= University College Dublin Library =

Coordinates: 53.306816°N 6.222995°W

UCD Library Leabharlann UCD
- Location: Belfield, Dublin 4, Ireland
- Type: Academic library
- Branches: 5 libraries, 3 cultural heritage units

Collection
- Size: 3 Special Collections

Access and use
- Population served: 26,354 FTE students excluding overseas campuses

Other information
- Employees: 103.3 FTE
- Website: www.ucd.ie/library

The University College Dublin Library, composed of five separate bodies, holds varied ranges of digital and printed books on a wide range of topics, including architecture, arts and humanities, business studies, engineering, law, medicine, science, social sciences and veterinary medicine. In 2015 UCD Archives and the National Folklore Collection UCD came under the administrative umbrella of UCD Library.

University College Dublin (UCD) is the Republic of Ireland's largest university. It is located in Dublin, Ireland.

== Buildings and locations ==
There are 5 UCD libraries: the James Joyce Library at Belfield serves as the administrative centre of the library system: it accommodates the central services and 85% of the stock; the Health Sciences library (for medicine, nursing and physiotherapy) is located in the UCD Health Sciences Centre at Belfield; Architecture (for architecture, landscape and planning) is in the Richview precinct at Belfield; Veterinary Medicine, located in the Veterinary Sciences Centre at Belfield; the UCD Michael Smurfit School of Business library at the Blackrock Campus. Accommodation for readers consists of some 3,150 reading and study places, including some single and group study and PBL rooms, and social learning areas. Wireless internet is available throughout all of the libraries, there are wired network points provided, and power outlets are available to about a half of study seats. A number of IT Services open computer labs and PC clusters are located within the libraries.

== Information resources ==
The library as a whole contains over 800,000 print volumes, and access to over 260,000 e-books. Almost 80% of stock is on open access. Approximately 7,500 purchased monographs, and 2,500 donations or legal deposit items are added to stock each year, and 99,000 current journal titles and databases are available, the vast majority of which are e-journals. The library is a European Documentation Centre, a national depository for United States government publications, and a legal deposit library for Irish publications. A holding of some 30,000 early printed books and special collections is housed in a separate bookstack with independent environmental control. In addition, almost 40,000 pre-1930 items are managed by them. UCD Archives and the National Folklore Collection at UCD house collections for use by the UCD community and external researchers.

== The UCD Digital Library ==
The UCD Library supports digital repository services for dissemination of open access publications by university staff as well as for management of digitized cultural heritage resources and data produced or consumed by the UCD community.

In collaboration with UCD Research, there is interoperability between the library Institutional Repository (IR) and the UCD Research Management System (RMS) providing a single route to update research profiles and deposit individual full text items. The institutional repository is based on DSpace and provides access to full text articles, working papers, reports, and other staff publications. It also provides a means of exporting information to a national open access repository, RIAN, as well as other subject-specific portals. The UCD Digital Library, the successor to the IVRLA project, is a platform for the dissemination of diverse digital content associated with the university. In addition to cultural heritage collections, additional content includes geographic, quantitative and qualitative data produced or consumed by the UCD community. The new platform went live in summer 2012, and a major upgrade including a responsive website for use on both mobile and desktop devices, plus other new features went live in November 2014.

== Library management system and other online environments ==
The library website was re-designed and the content refreshed in 2011, and a further update completed summer 2014. In 2017 another major redesign took place.

A new Library Management System, from Innovative Interfaces, went live in July 2012, and upgraded to the newer Sierra platform in May 2015. In 2013, the library piloted the LibGuides product as a complement to the website and decided to mainstream this from 2014 for subject and thematic guides. This website project also included a new design for LibGuides. In August 2014, the library launched the Summon 2.0 web-scale discovery service, badged locally as OneSearch. The library also maintains a social media presence, including an instant messaging chat service, a Twitter feed, an Instagram presence, YouTube channels, a blog and a Facebook page.

== Services ==
Lending, document supply, information skills training, and reference and information services are available in all library locations. Print journals, reference materials, official publications, theses, and Special Collections materials are not available for loan. A charge is made for Inter-Library Loan and document supply. Copi Print provides print and copying facilities, on a paid self-service basis, in the libraries and in other university buildings.

Services have increasingly moved online, with online fines and charges payment introduced November 2013 using the university e-wallet system UCard, followed by online group study room booking from January 2014 using the Springshare product LibCal. Laptop loans at the largest library moved to a self-service system in September 2014, with the Health Sciences library following in August 2017. Online booking of individual study rooms and the Postgraduate Research Centre commenced in February 2015. The library also holds training workshops which are booked online through the UCD People Development booking system.

The Short Loan collection in the James Joyce library and the entire stock of the Blackrock and Veterinary Medicine libraries uses RFID technology. This allows readers to borrow and return books without the assistance of library staff.

Opening hours in each of the five UCD libraries vary throughout the year.

== Liaison with other libraries and organisations ==
UCD Library participates in a number of collaborative initiatives and projects. These include IReL (the Irish e-Library, an initiative funded by the Higher Education Authority and Science Foundation Ireland to provide a world-class portfolio of e-journals to support research), IRIS (a company which manages the IReL initiative), ALCID (a reciprocal access scheme for academic staff and postgraduate research students), CONUL Training and Development, which provides a regular staff training and development programme, and the RIAN Project, funded through the Higher Education Authority's Strategic Innovation Fund to provide e-repositories in each university, and a national portal, for open-access research publications. Internationally, the library has participated in the past in a number of research projects funded through the European Commission's FRAMEWORK Programmes, and, as an affiliate member of the NEREUS Consortium, participated in the NEEO (Network of European Economists Online) project, funded by the eContentplus Programme, a multilingual portal to the full-text research outputs of 500 top researchers in the partner institutions. UCD Library was a partner with the library of the Queen's University of Belfast in the PADDI (Planning Architecture Design Database Ireland) project and both libraries continue to jointly operate the PADDI Database service. UCD Library is an institutional member of SCONUL, CONUL, IATUL, IFLA and LIBER.

== See also ==
- List of libraries in the Republic of Ireland
