= Betty Moys =

British law librarian and indexer

- Born: 26 June 1928; Wickford, Essex
- Died: 1 February 2002 (aged 73)
- Occupation: Librarian

Elizabeth Mary Moys (26 June 1928 – 1 February 2002) was an English law librarian and indexer. She was born in Wickford, Essex, grew up in Kent, attended Sidcup County School for Girls and graduated from Queen Mary College in London (1949). One of her first jobs was at the Crayford Branch of the Kent County Library Service. Shortly thereafter, she attended the Northwestern Polytechnic School of Librarianship and helped found the School of Librarianship Students’ Association. Following graduation in 1951, she worked as a reference librarian at the Royal Institute of International Affairs (1951) and as an Assistant Librarian at the Institute of Advanced Legal Studies (1952).

Betty was involved with many professional organisations over the course of her career including the British and Irish Association of Law Librarians (BIALL), the Society of Indexers, the International Association of Law Libraries (IALL), the Chartered Institute of Library and Information Professionals (CILIP), the American Society of Indexers, and the Cataloguing and Indexing Group (CIG).

Moys was awarded the Wheatley Medal in 1991 by the Society of Indexers. She was appointed a Member of the Order of the British Empire in the 2000 Birthday Honours.

== Moys Classification Scheme ==
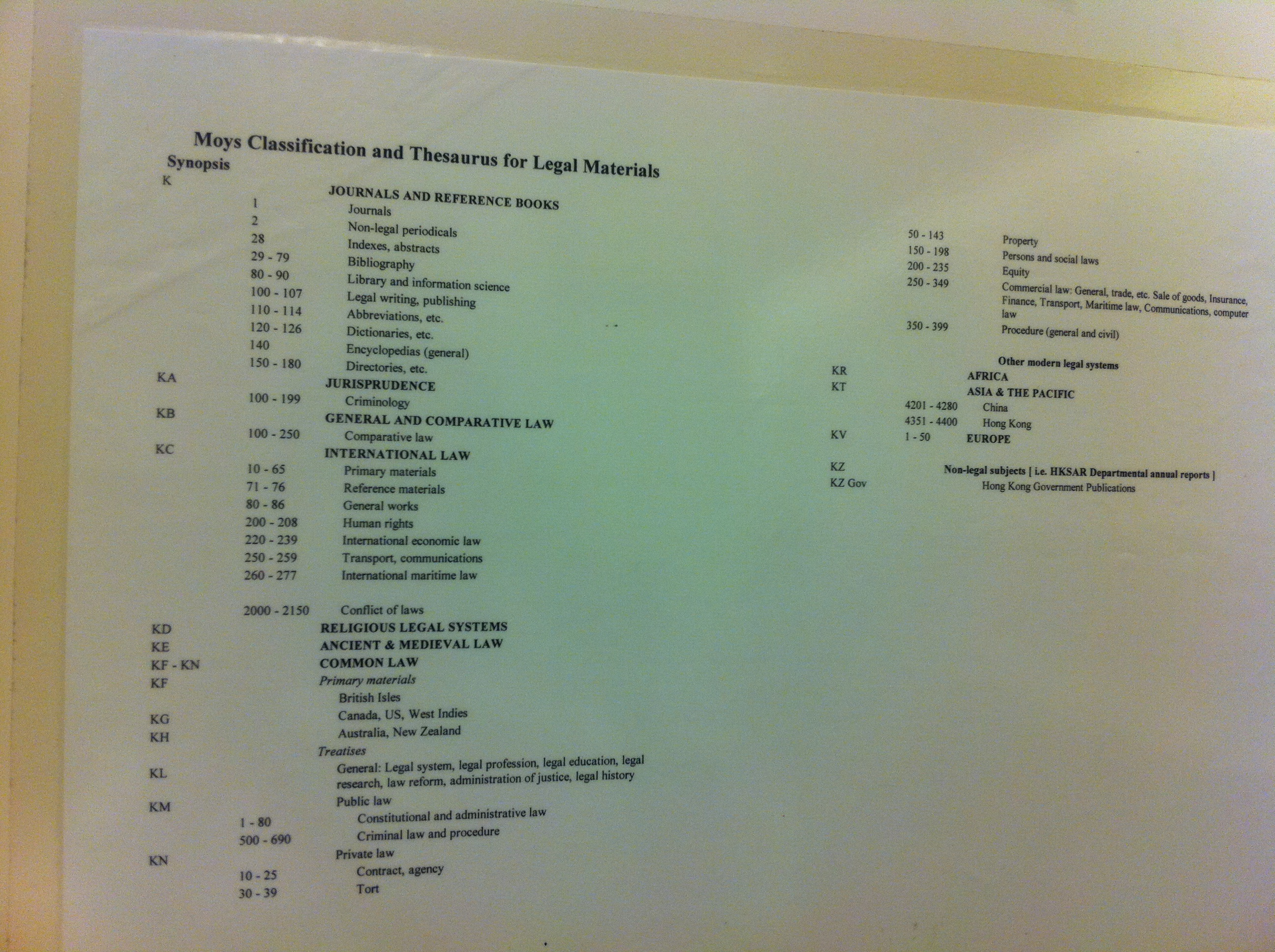
Moys Classification System

The Moys Classification Scheme for Law Books was published in 1968. Subsequent editions have been published since then, with a fifth edition published in 2012. It is used primarily in legal libraries in Canada, Australia, New Zealand, and the United Kingdom.
