= Blessington Street Basin =

Former reservoir, now part of a park, central Dublin, Ireland

- Royal George Reservoir (former name)
- Báisín Shráid Bhaile Coimín (Irish)
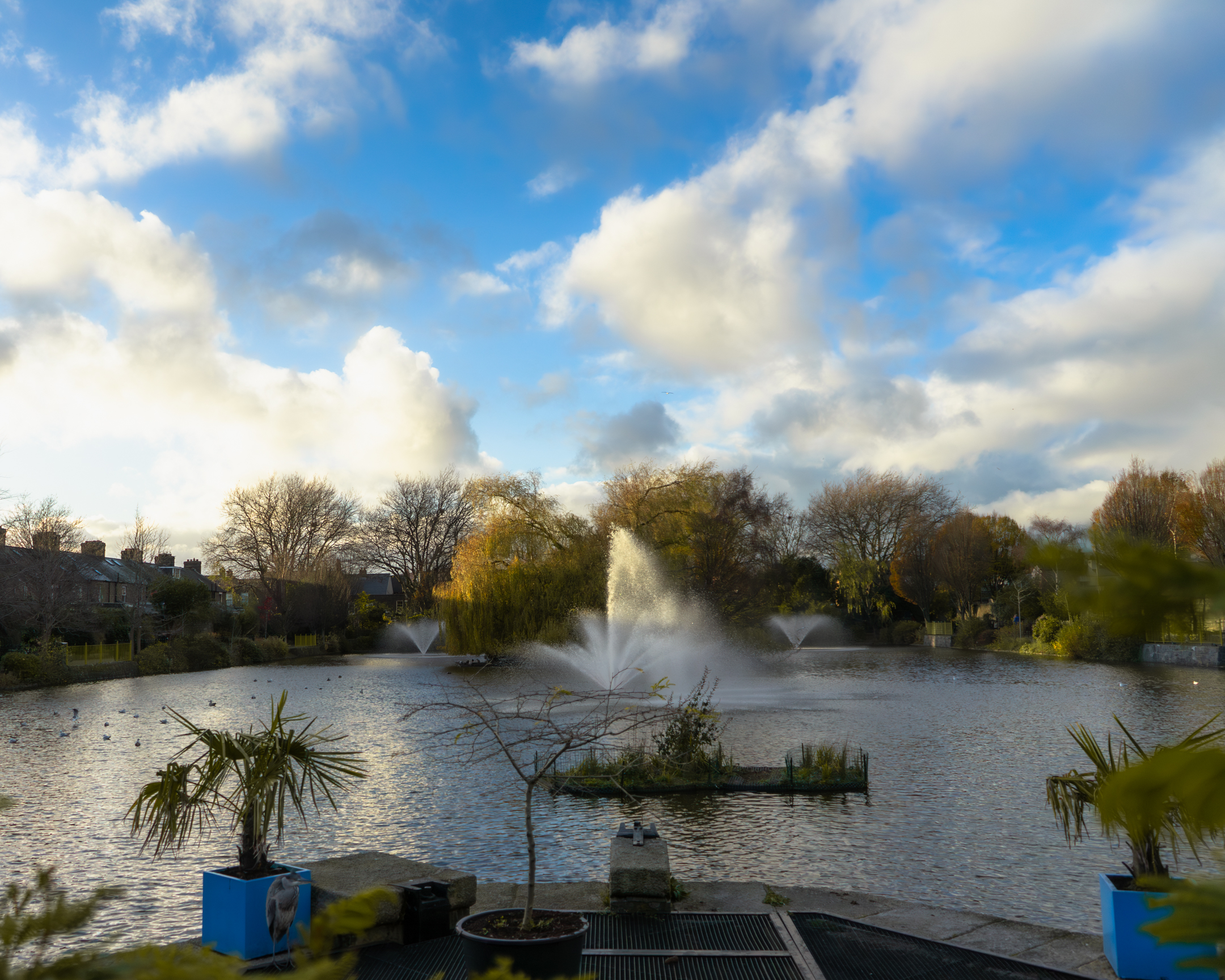
- A fountain in the middle of Blessington Street Basin

- Location within Central Dublin Location within Dublin
- Location: County Dublin
- Coordinates: 53°21′26″N 6°16′15″W
- Type: reservoir
- Basin countries: Ireland
- Built: 1803
- Max. length: 120 m (390 ft)
- Max. width: 60 m (200 ft)
- Water volume: 15.1 megalitres (12.2 acre⋅ft)

Blessington Street Basin (Irish: Báisín Shráid Bhaile Coimín) is a former drinking water reservoir in northern central Dublin which operated from 1810 until the 1970s, serving the north city. It became the central feature of a public park in 1891, and this park was renewed and reopened in 1994.

== Features and access ==
The main entrance to the park is on Blessington Street. There are two additional entrances to the park with cut granite surrounds set in the boundary walls Royal Canal Park and Primrose Street. The central reservoir is 122 metres long, 55 metres wide and has an average depth of 2.5 metres. It holds approximately 15 million litres of water. The reservoir is surrounded by a railing, with a path approximately 5 metres wide running around the edge, with planting near the walls.

The site also includes a lodge house built in a Tudor style in 1811, and another modern council building.

== History ==
=== City Basin (1721) ===
Dublin had one drinking water reservoir, the City Basin, at James' Street, constructed on high ground near the House of Industry on the south side of the city, from 1721. The area had been used as a cistern and centre of waterworks for the city for several centuries prior with the water coming from a diversion of part of the River Dodder along what was referred to as the city watercourse at Balrothery Weir in Firhouse.

=== New City Basin (1803) ===
Blessington Street Basin, a new city basin, to supply the northside of the city, was constructed by Dublin Corporation beginning about 1803, and finished in 1810. The facility was opened as the Royal George Reservoir, named in honour of George III.

The water came from the Broadstone line of the Royal Canal, and so ultimately from Lough Owel in County Westmeath. It came by pipe into the basin at the western end of Blessington Street.

From its construction, the area around the reservoir was used as a park, but it was formally developed as a public park in 1891. The large main entrance facing on Blessington Street dates from the park's opening in 1810. The park project was supervised by architect Spencer Harty, and including the construction of brick walls and a lodge for a park warden.

By 1869, the basin was not large enough for purpose, and water collection moved outside the city. The basin continued to serve the Jameson's and Powers' distilleries until the 1970s, and then went out of operation as a reservoir. There were worries about the stagnant water creating a typhoid outbreak in the late 1800s leading the city corporation to consider filling in the basin and the stretch of water connecting the basin to the canal; this connection was finally filled in 1956.

=== Refurbishment ===
In 1993 work began on the restoration of the site following a rejected proposal by the German environmental artist, Dieter Magnus, sponsored by the Goethe-Institut to extensively refurbish it in 1991. The refurbishment was carried out by the Dublin City Council aided by FÁS, and with financial support from the National Heritage Council and ALONE and it retained the park's shape and character. The local artist, Austin McQuinn, was commissioned to produce bronze sculptures which are now incorporated into the north boundary wall. The works, which draw on natural forms, are entitled Natural Histories. The park was reopened on 4 November 1994 by the Irish President, Mary Robinson, and Lord Mayor John Gormley.

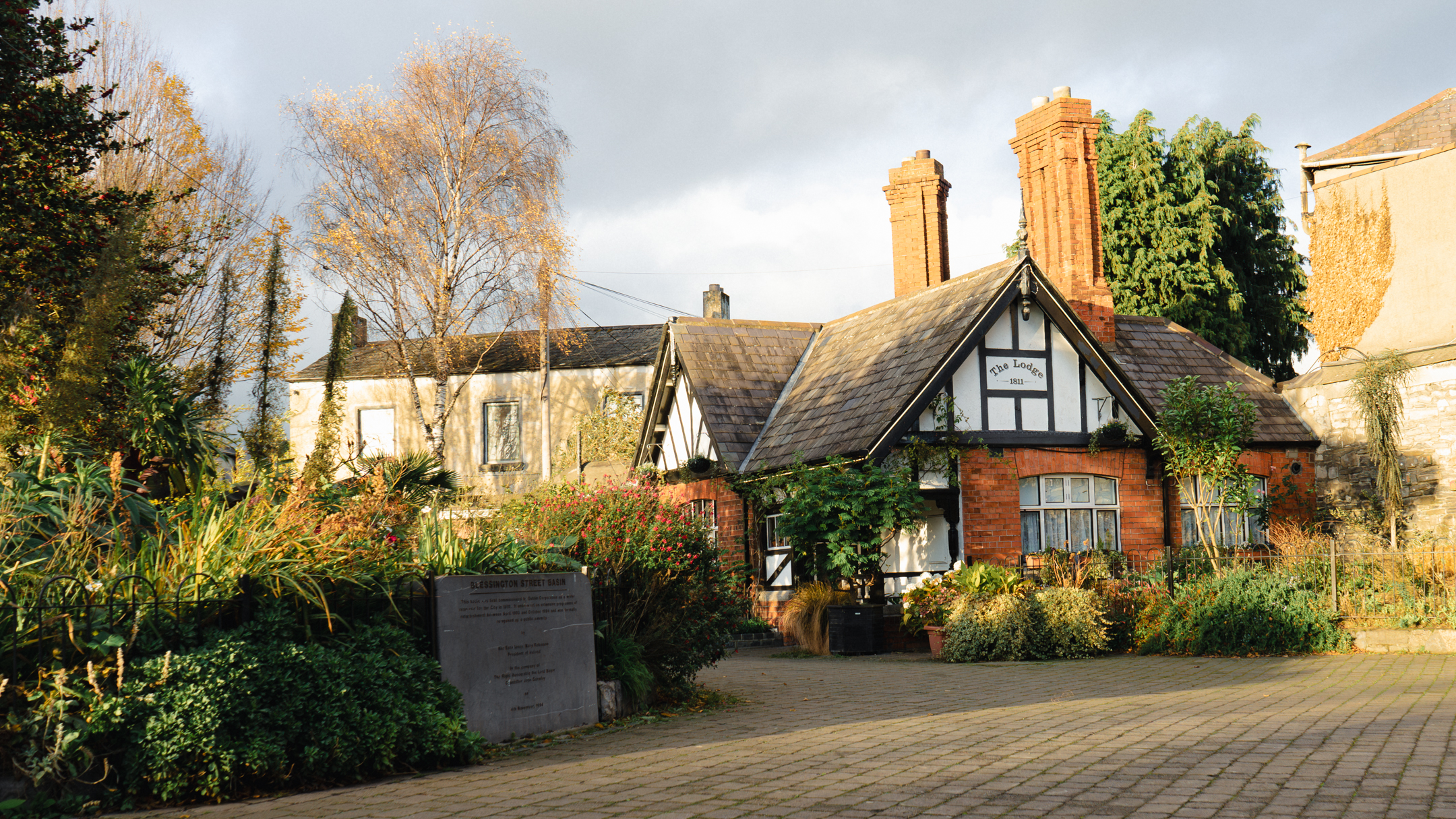
Lodge house, built in 1811

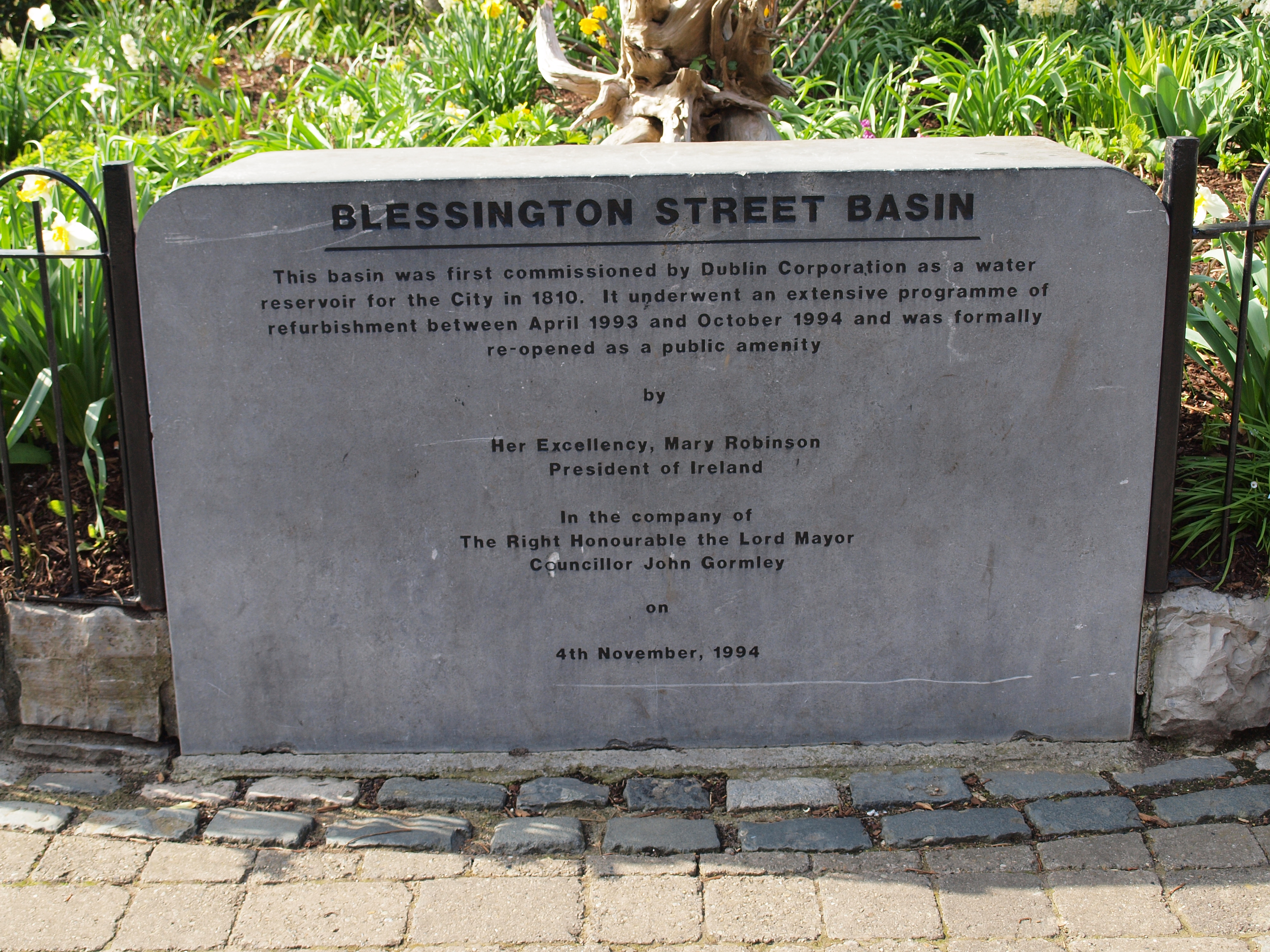
Plaque commemorating the opening of the park

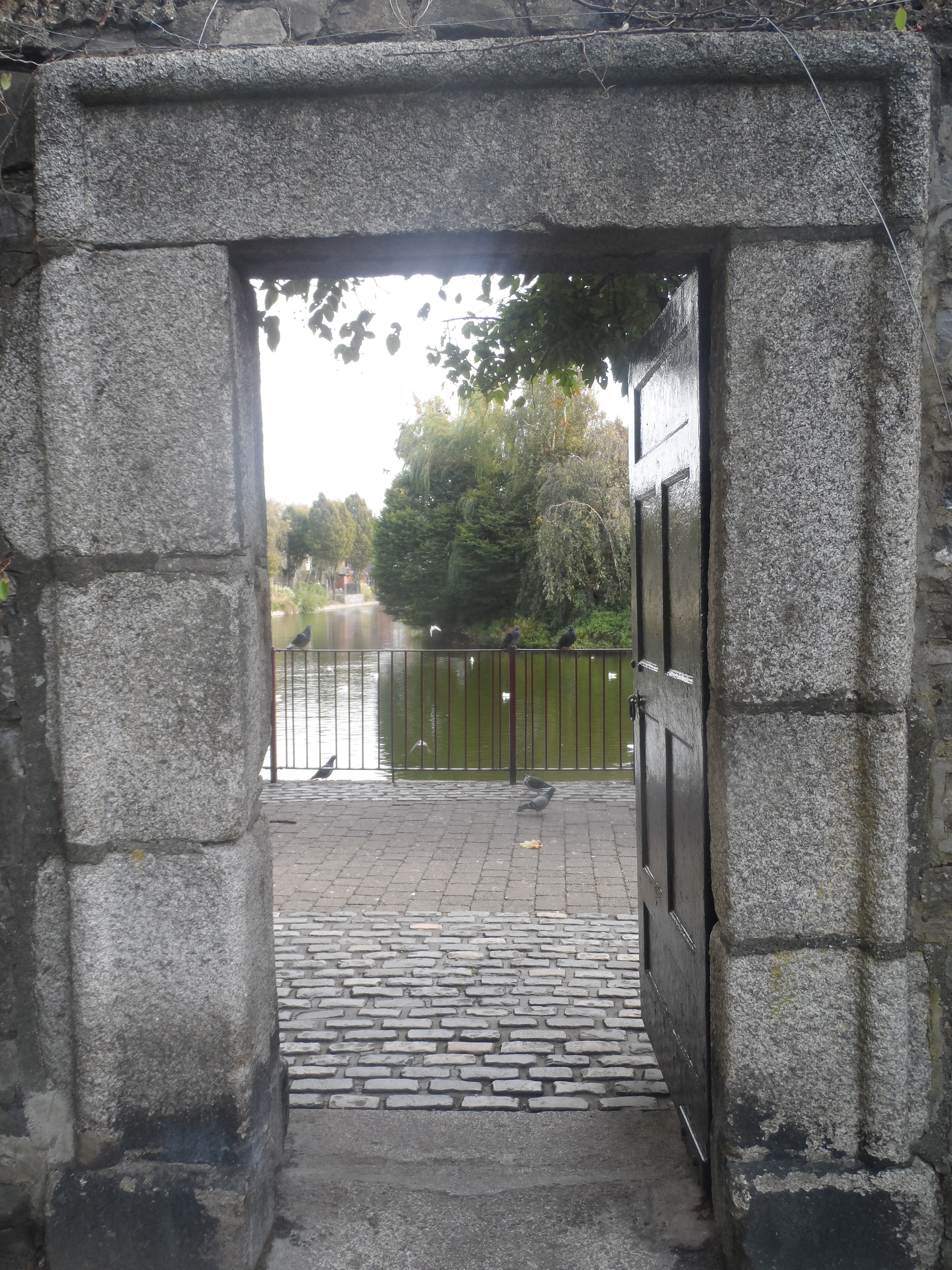
West entrance

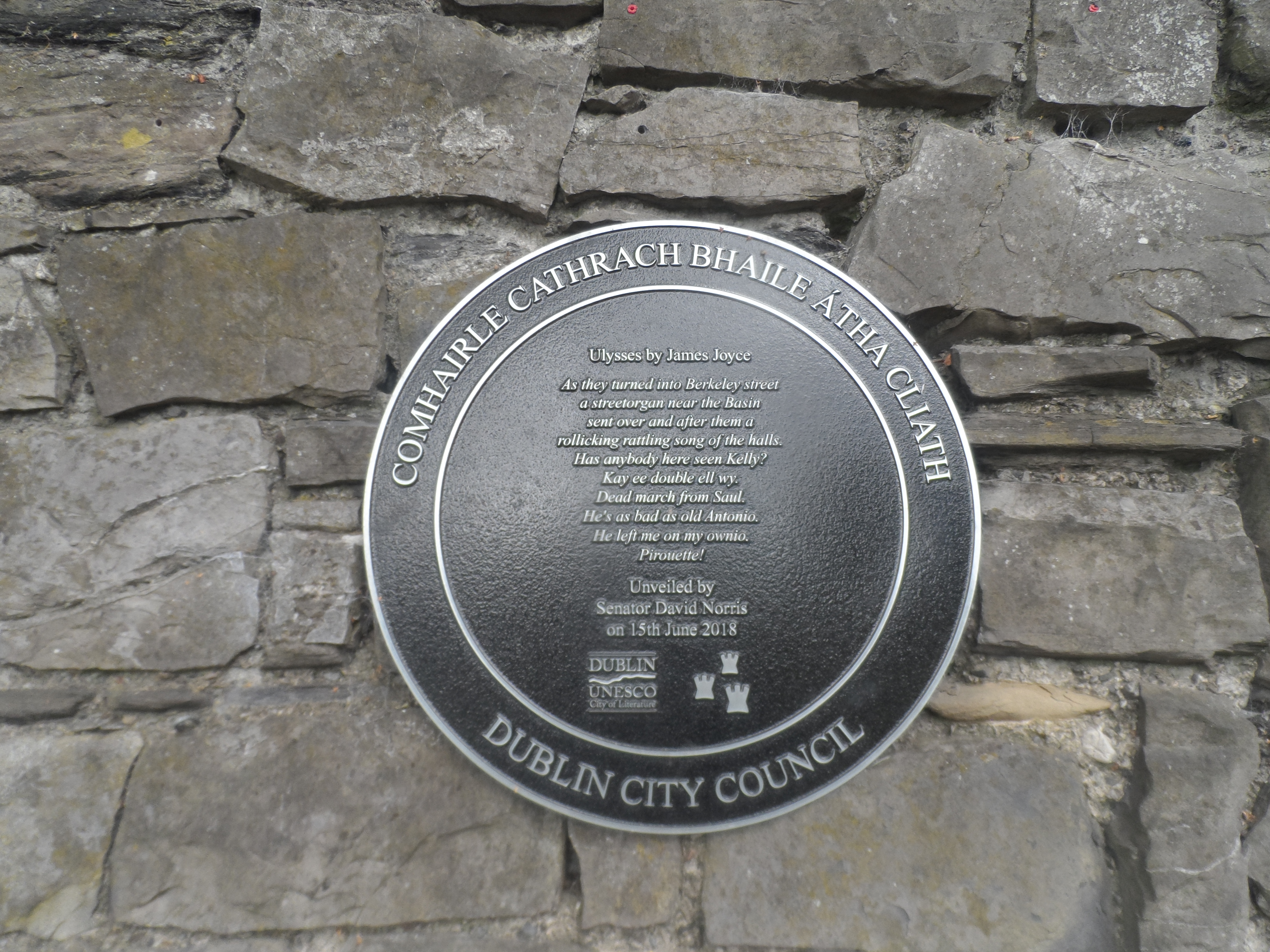
Plaque unveiled by David Norris in 2018, with a quote from James Joyce's Ulysses that mentions the Basin

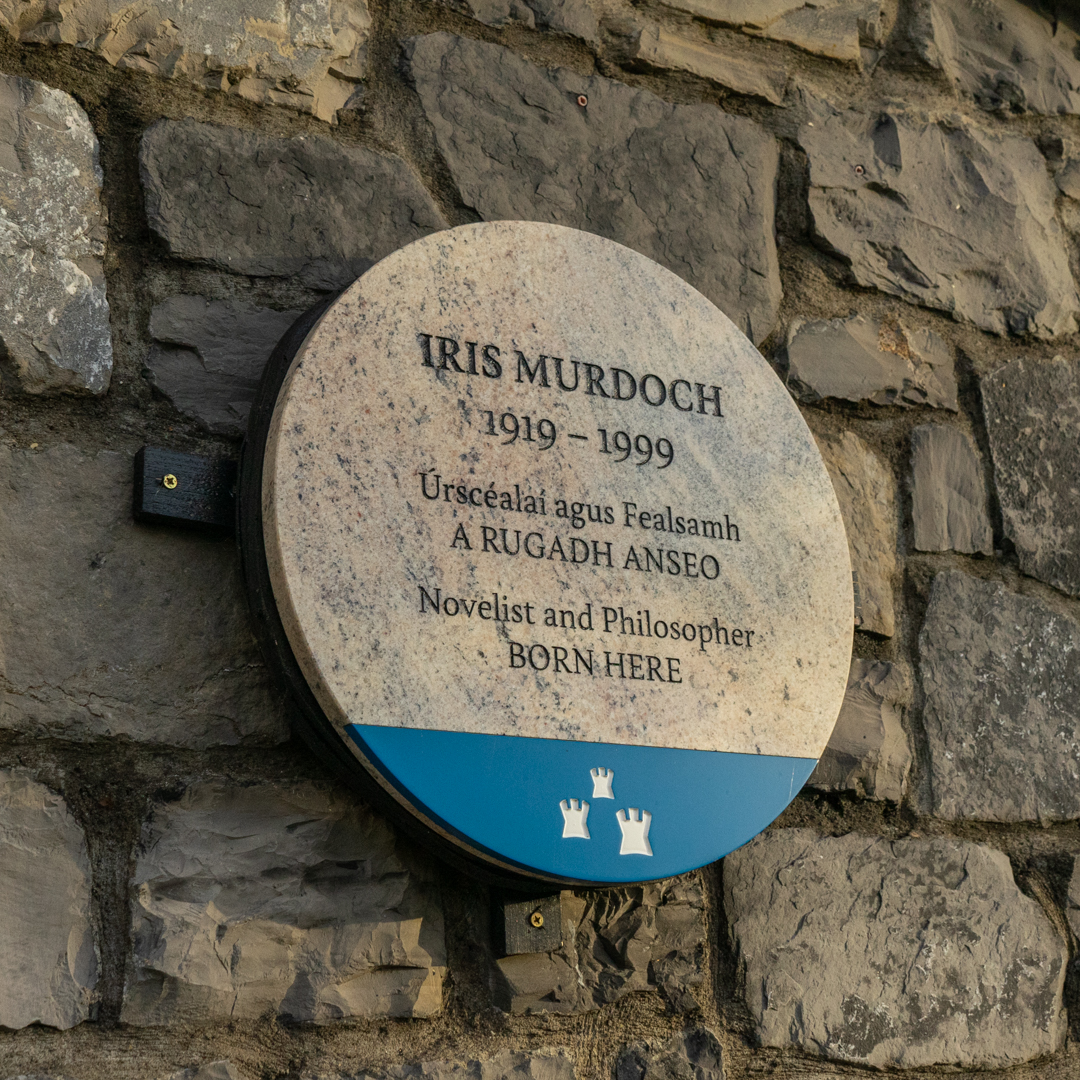
The Iris Murdoch Commemorative Plaque erected in the Basin

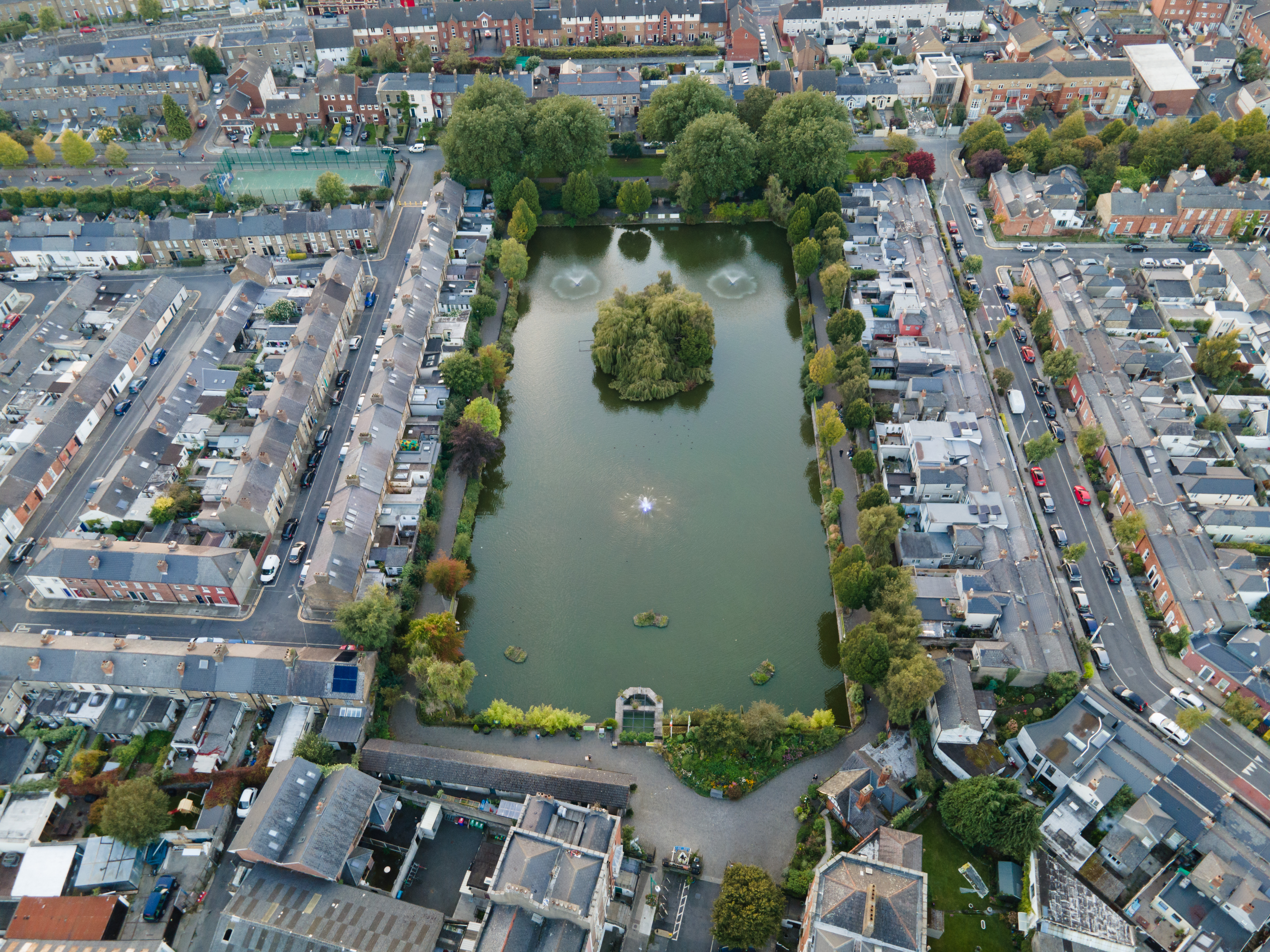
Blessington Street Basin from above

== Nature ==
An artificial island was constructed during the restoration to provide a home for birds, and is planted with trees and shrubs. Fountains have been introduced to the basin to add interest but also oxygenate the water. Amongst the birds that can be seen there are swans, tufted ducks, chaffinches, mallards and pigeons. Among the trees planted in the park are oak, willow and specimen trees such as American sweetgum.

== In fiction ==
The basin is one of the locations featured in the book, The Coroner's Daughter by Andrew Hughes, which was selected as the Dublin UNESCO City of Literature One City One Book for 2023. There is a passing mention of the basin in James Joyce's Ulysses also.

== See also ==
- Blessington, County Wicklow
