= British and Irish Association of Law Librarians =

The British and Irish Association of Law Librarians (BIALL) is a professional body which represents information professionals working with legal information. BIALL is a self-supporting association which draws its income primarily from membership subscriptions.

== History ==
BIALL was set up in 1969 following workshops on law librarianship held at Harrogate in 1968 and 1969. Two strands led to the formation of BIALL. Firstly, the law librarians in London, Oxford, Cambridge and Ireland had been in contact and working together since the late 1940s, reinforced by their membership of the International Association of Law Librarians (IALL). Secondly, the outreach programme of Leeds Library School led to one of the school's staff, Don Daintree, organising Workshops on Law Librarianship in Harrogate in 1968 and 1969. They brought together the foremost law library figures as speakers and those few people who were working in law libraries as students of the Workshops. The inspiration for the Workshops was the Library Association's List C papers on the bibliography and librarianship of subjects.

The 1st Harrogate Workshop in February was held at the Russell Hotel and a meeting at the end of the Workshop set up an ad hoc Committee to look into the possibility of establishing an association of law librarians. Committee members were Wallace Breem, Don Daintree, Betty Moys, Willi Steiner and Derek Way. The 2nd Harrogate Workshop in April concluded with a meeting which set up an Association of Law Librarians. This was the inaugural meeting and those who were present are BIALL's founder members. The first AGM was held in a basement room of the old IALS building in Russell Square on Monday 22 September. It was chaired by Willi Steiner, several hours were spent debating the minutiae of the draft Constitution. One of the decisions was to form a separate organisation, not affiliated to, or part of, the Library Association, resulting from strong arguments that organisations (especially law firms) who had no professional librarians, would be excluded from membership if the Association were part of the LA. The principle of welcoming professionally qualified and non-qualified law librarians into BIALL has prevailed ever since.

The first officers were Don Daintree (chairman), Wallace Breem (secretary and treasurer) and Betty Moys (editor). An executive committee was subsequently elected and in November it set up a Sub-Committee of Betty Moys, Allan Appleby of Sweet and Maxwell, and Wallace Breem to produce a journal.

== BIALL Conference ==
BIALL organises an annual Conference every year which all BIALL members are invited to attend. The Conference is an opportunity to listen to talks delivered by Legal Information Professionals and Industry experts as well as network with colleagues. The 2020 and 2021 conferences were moved online due to the COVID-19 pandemic, but the 2022 conference is due to be held in Bedford on 6–8 July 2022.

Previous Conferences have taken place at Bournemouth (2019) (the 50th anniversary of both the organisation, and the conference), Birmingham (2018), Manchester (2017), Dublin (2016), Brighton (2015), Harrogate (2014), Glasgow (2013), Belfast (2012), Gateshead (2011), Brighton (2010), Manchester (2009), Dublin (2008), Sheffield (2007), Brighton (2006), Harrogate (2005), Edinburgh (2004), and Cardiff (2003).

== Awards and other activities ==
BIALL administers and presents several awards at its annual conference dinner including the BIALL Supplier of the Year Award, the LexisLibrary Awards (formerly the Halsbury's Awards), the biannual Wallace Breem Award, the Betty Moys Award, the Legal Journals Award, and the Wildy Law Librarian of the Year Award.

== Publications ==
Legal Information Management http://journals.cambridge.org/action/displayJournal?jid=LIM

Handbook of Legal Information Management, 2nd ed (2014)

Moys Classification and Thesaurus for Legal Materials (2012)

== See also ==
- List of libraries in the Republic of Ireland
