= Moys Classification Scheme =

The Moys Classification Scheme is a system of library classification for legal materials. It was designed by Betty Moys and first published in 1968. It is used primarily in law libraries in many common law jurisdictions such as Canada, Australia, New Zealand, and the United Kingdom.

== Overview ==
The Moys system is designed to fit into a library that utilises Library of Congress Classification (LCC). The primary reason for this is that LCC had not fully developed the K class (the class for Law) at the time when the Moys system was developed. In addition, LCC is the main classification system used in academic libraries. This commonality is the rationale behind adopting the same notation style used in the LCC Class K. The subclasses and enumeration are very different in the two systems, though. As with LCC, a set of numbers follows the class letters to indicate specific subject areas (however, there is notably less use of decimal points in the Moys system than in LCC).

== Classes ==
Note: Not all of these subclasses are mandatory, and certain classes may not be utilised in some libraries.

- K - Journals and reference books
- KA - Jurisprudence
- KB - General and comparative law
- KC - International law
- KD - Religious legal systems
- KE - Ancient and medieval law
- KF-KN - Common law

- KF - British Isles
- KG - Canada, US, West Indies
- KH - Australia, New Zealand
- KL - General
- KM - Public law

- KN - Private law
- KP - Preferred jurisdiction
- KR - Africa
- KS - Latin America
- KT - Asia and Pacific
- KV - Europe
- KW - European Community Law (alternative)
- KZ - Non-legal subjects

== Tables ==
Tables I consist of primary materials such as official gazettes, legislation, and codes.
