= Charlemont House =

18th-century house in Dublin, Ireland

Coordinates: 53.35421°N 6.26478°W

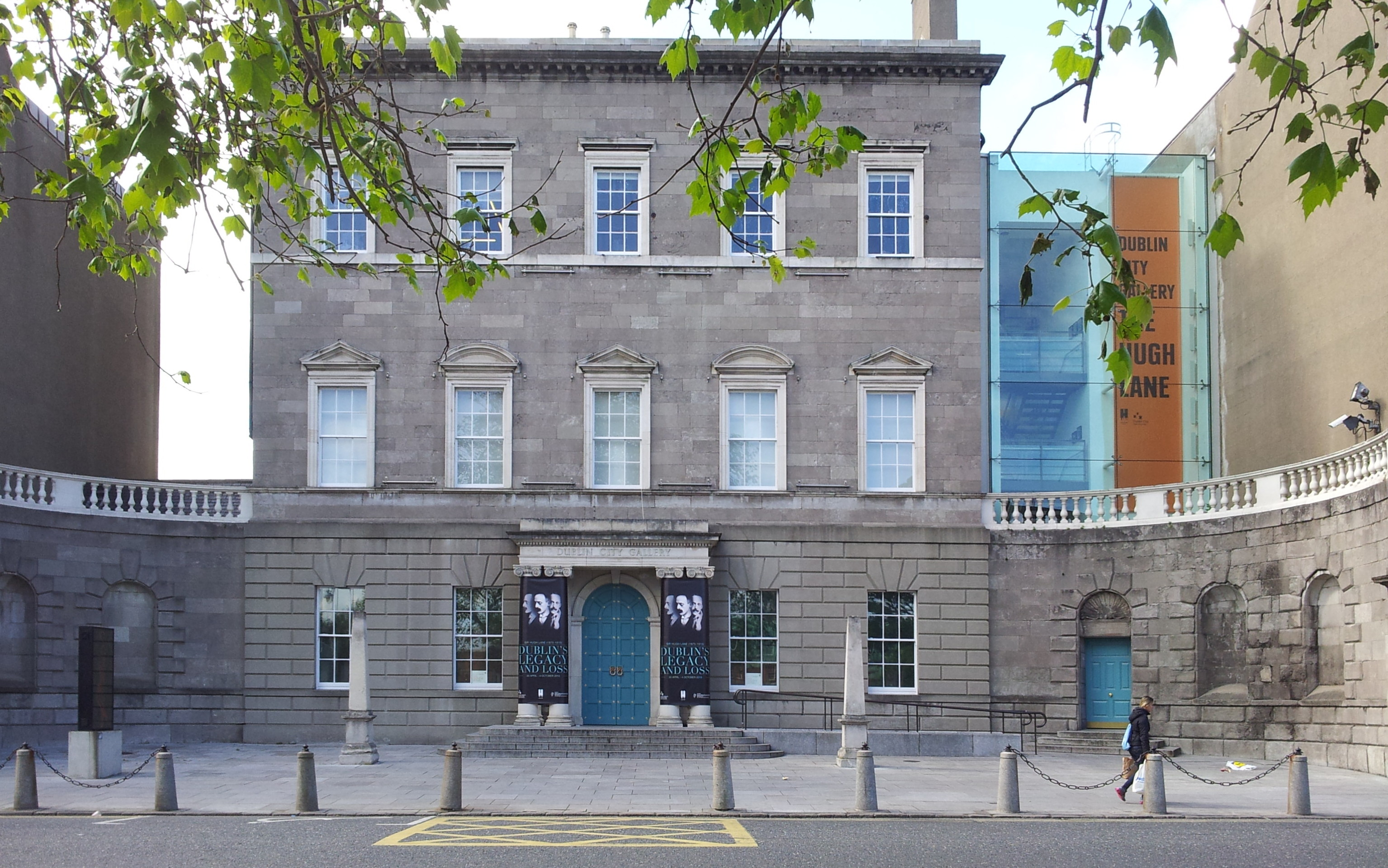
- Front of Charlemont House

- Location within Central Dublin

General information
- Type: Private house
- Architectural style: Georgian
- Location: Dublin, Ireland
- Current tenants: Hugh Lane Gallery
- Construction started: 1763
- Completed: 1778
- Renovated: 1931
- Landlord: Dublin City Council

Technical details
- Material: Granite, Portland stone and ruled cement
- Floor count: 3 over basement

Design and construction
- Architects: Sir William Chambers and later Horace Tennyson O'Rourke (1931-33)
- Developer: James Caulfeild, 1st Earl of Charlemont
- Other designers: Simon Vierpyl (master mason)

Charlemont House is a mansion in Dublin, Ireland. The house was built in 1763 and designed by William Chambers for James Caulfeild, 1st Earl of Charlemont. It is a stone fronted mansion on Dublin's Parnell Square. It was purchased by the government in 1870 and since 1933 it has housed the Hugh Lane Dublin City Gallery.

== History ==
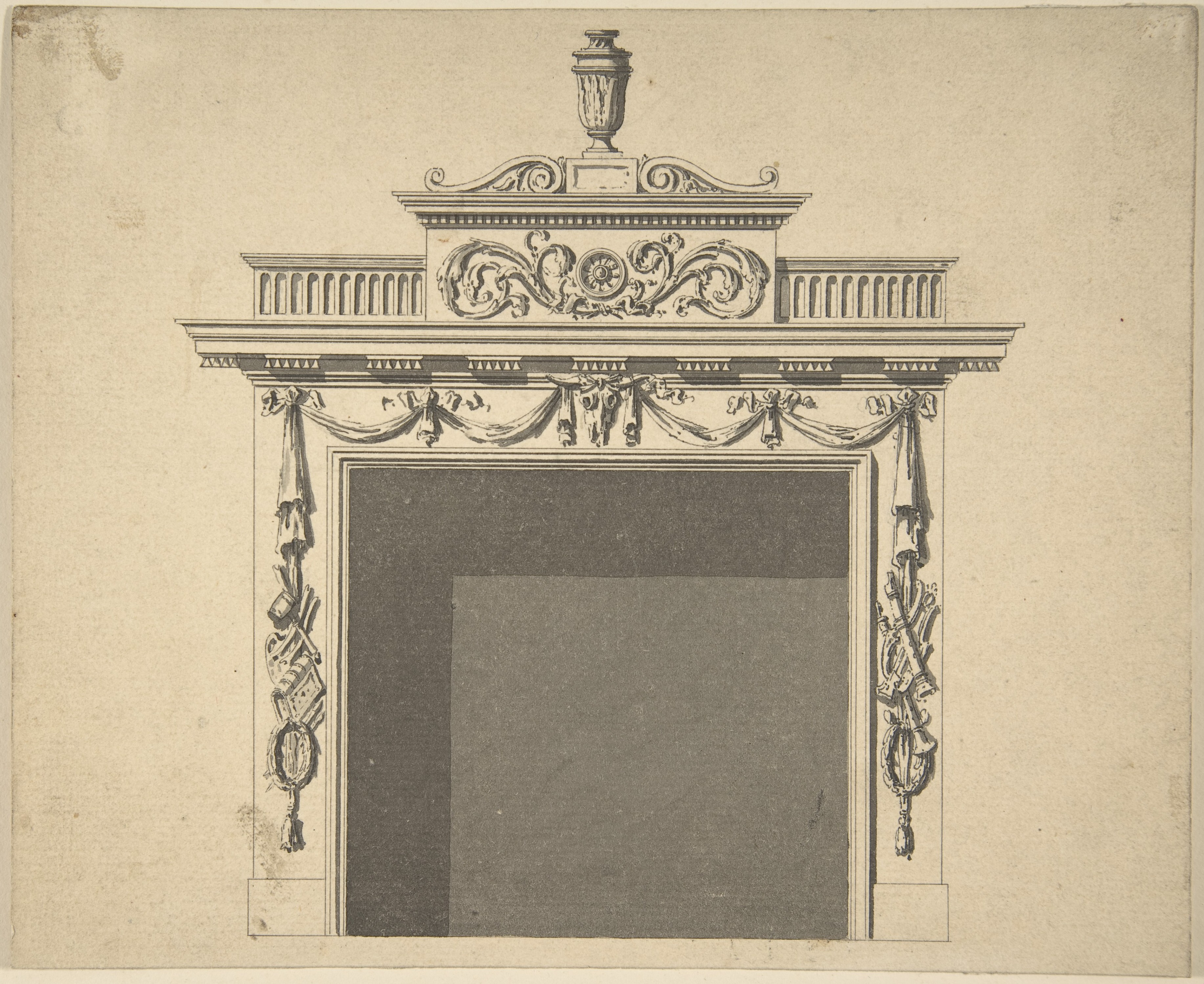
Design for Hall Chimney-piece, Charlemont House, Dublin, drawing by Sir William Chambers.

The house was designed by William Chambers in 1763 for James Caulfeild, 1st Earl of Charlemont. It is likely Chambers never saw the finished design and it was executed with the assistance of Simon Vierpyl and others in his absence. Many of the other top craftsmen and designers of the day were also engaged including Giovanni Battista Cipriani to create chiaroscuro for the library while James Gandon also designed the Rockingham library in 1789.

== In art ==
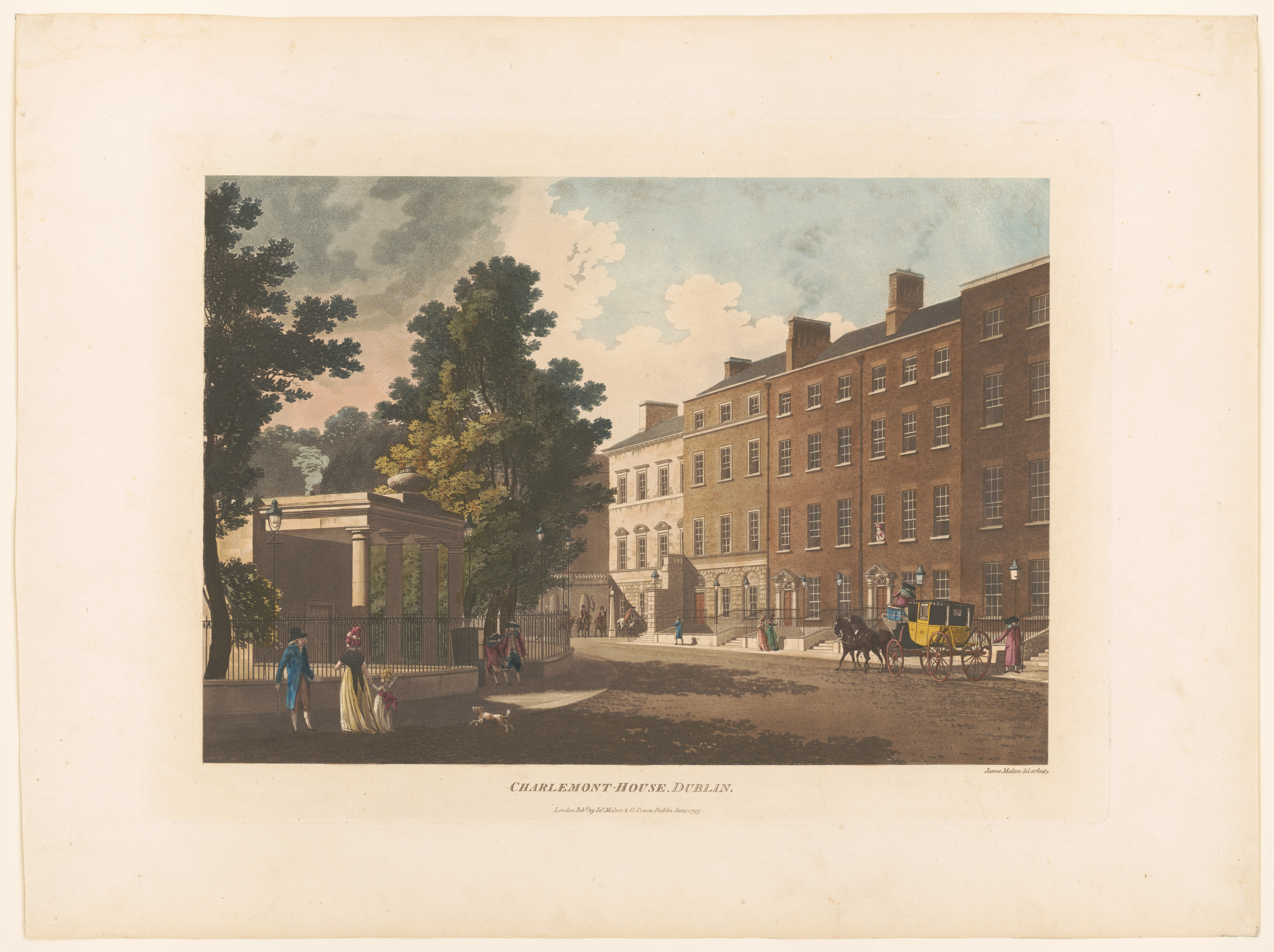
Charlemont House illustrated under sunlight by James Malton

The house features in James Malton's views of Dublin where it is illustrated partially obscured from the corner of Rutland Square.

== In fiction ==
The house is one of the locations featured in the book The Coroner's Daughter by Andrew Hughes, which was selected as the Dublin UNESCO City of Literature One City One Book for 2023.

== Art collection ==
The Earl kept an extensive art collection at the house, among them included Judas Repentant, Returning the Pieces of Silver by Rembrandt, The Lady's Last Stake and The Gate of Calais by William Hogarth as well as other lesser known paintings by Annibale Carracci, Tintoretto, Ambrogio Bergognone and Anthony van Dyck.
