= Waterford City Library =

Coordinates: 52.25972°N 7.11111°W

Waterford City Library, also known as the Central Library, is a public library in Waterford, Ireland. It was the first to be built of Ireland's many Carnegie libraries. The philanthropist Andrew Carnegie, who had previously opened libraries in Scotland and the US, himself laid the foundation stone in 1903.

The library is built over Lady's Gate, part of the medieval city walls of the city. The stump of the tower beside Lady's Gate on Lady Lane can be seen through glass in the floor of the library during library opening hours.

== Library Service in Waterford ==
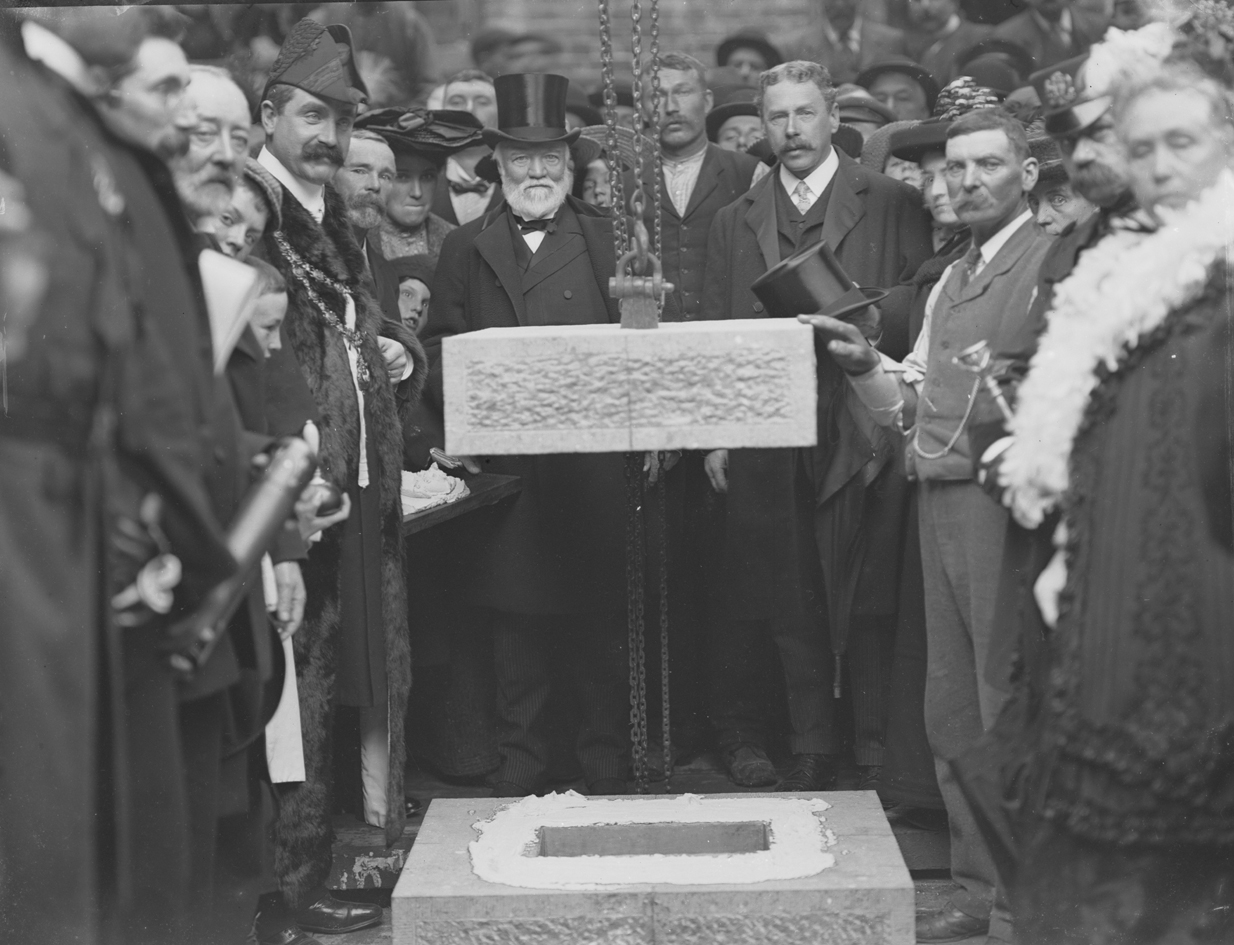
Andrew Carnegie laying the foundation stone for the Library in 1903.

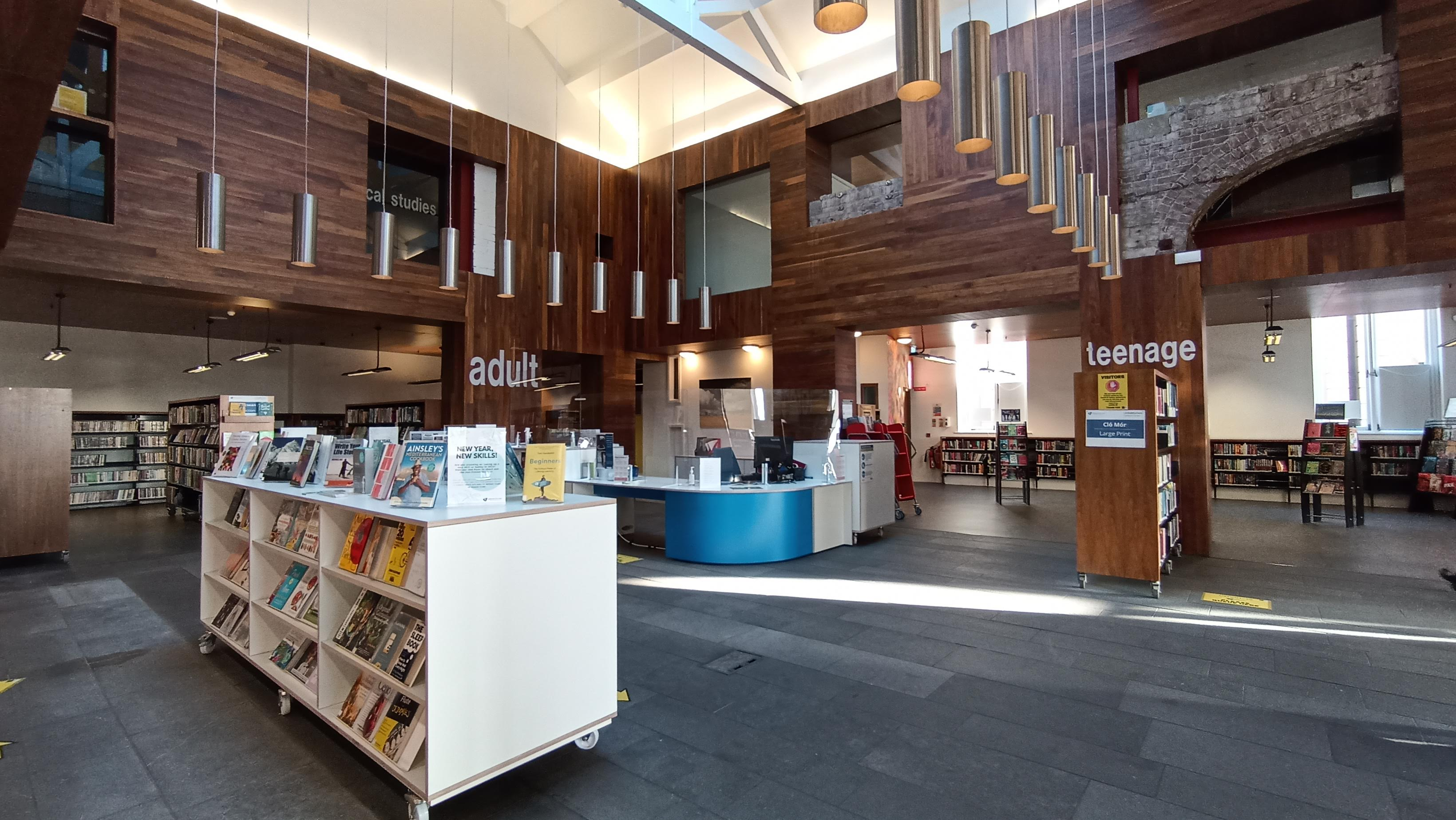
Internal ground floor library

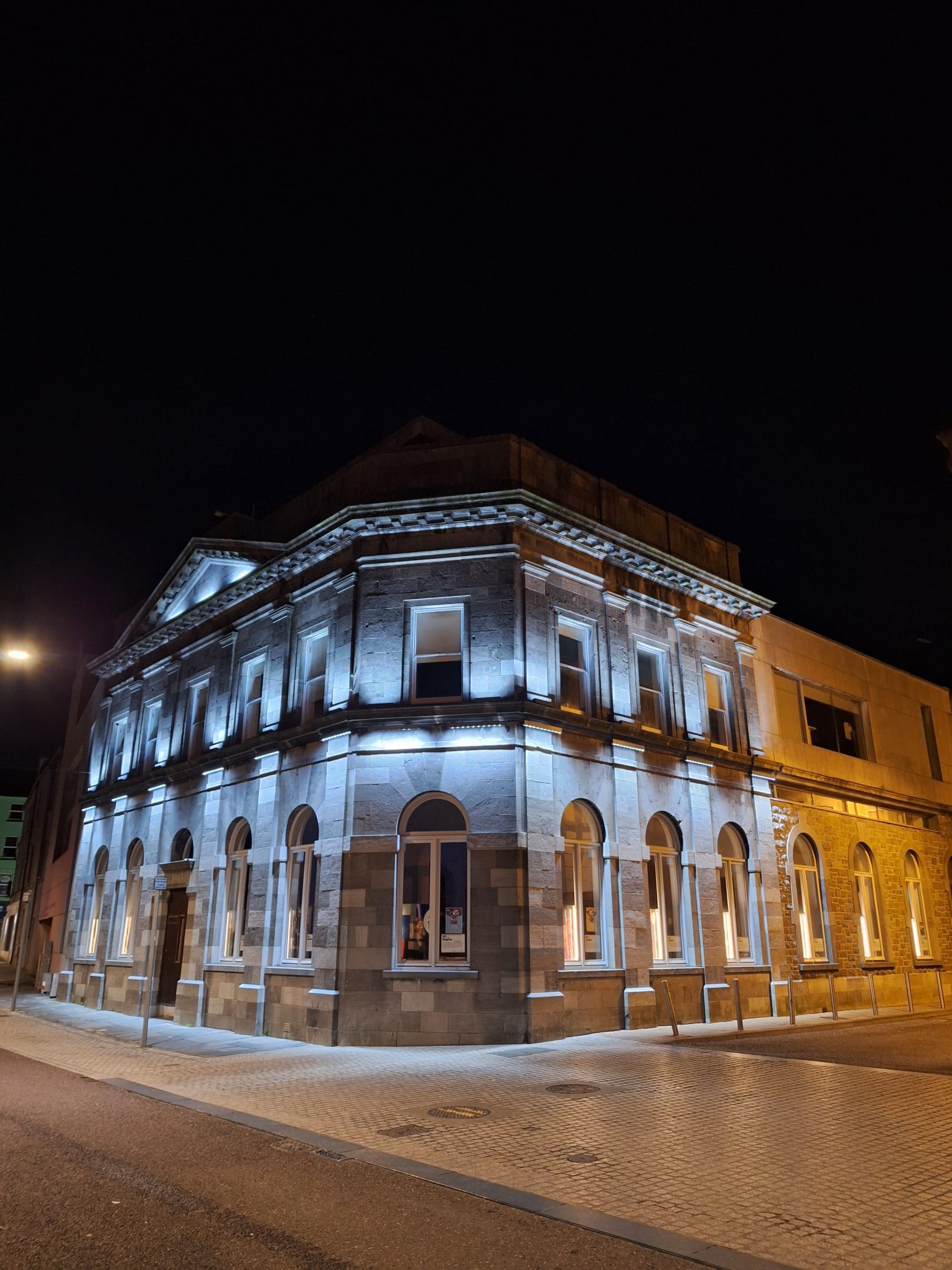
Central Library at night 2024

Central Library is the main branch of Waterford City and County Libraries, part of Waterford City and County Council. Waterford Libraries has 12 public library branches spread throughout Waterford City and County, with a centrally located headquarters on the outskirts of Waterford City.

Waterford Libraries are regularly used by 16,000 members and record in excess of 500,000 visits and 500,000 loans annually. Waterford's Central Library is one of eight Europe Direct centres in Ireland, part of a network of local contact points that serve as the direct link between citizens and the EU Institutions.

== Architecture ==
The classical-style building was constructed on a corner site using Kilkenny limestone. It is a protected structure. In 2004 the library was reopened after having been renovated by McCullogh Mulvin Architects for its centenary.

=== Exhibition ===
Images of the library were featured at the Venice Biennale of Architecture of 2008. The title of the exhibition in question, "Lives of Spaces", was intended to elicit multiple interpretations, "suggesting that, while spaces can contain many lives, they can equally live many lives themselves".

== See also ==
Carnegie went on to fund four more libraries in County Waterford:

- Ballyduff,
- Cappoquin
- Lismore
- Tallow
- List of libraries in the Republic of Ireland
