= Lia Mills =

Irish writer

- Born: Dublin
- Occupation: Writer

Lia Mills is an Irish writer. She writes novels, short stories and literary non-fiction. She has also worked on several public art commissions and as an arts consultant.

Her first novel, Another Alice (1996), was nominated for The Irish Times Irish Fiction prize. Her second novel, Nothing Simple (2005), was shortlisted for the Irish Novel of the Year at the inaugural Irish Book Awards. A memoir of her diagnosis of and treatment for oral cancer, In Your Face, appeared in 2007. Peter Sheridan, Joe Duffy and others named it as a favourite book of 2007. Her fourth book and third novel, Fallen was published in 2014. With Dr Denise MacCarthy she co-edited Word of Mouth: Coping with and Surviving Mouth, Head and Neck Cancers (2013).

Born in Dublin, she has lived in London and America before returning to Ireland in 1990. She claims that men are "more likely" to read writers who are also men, to the exclusion of women.

In 2016, Trinity College Dublin awarded her with an honorary doctorate.

== Books ==
- Fallen - Penguin Ireland, 2014
- In Your Face - Penguin Ireland, 2007
- Nothing Simple - Penguin Ireland, 2005
- Another Alice - Poolbeg Press, 1996
