= Dublin City Libraries =

Library system in the city of Dublin, Republic of Ireland

- Location: Dublin, Ireland
- Branches: 21

Access and use
- Population served: 553,165 (2016)

Other information
- Website: www.dublincity.ie/dublin-city-libraries

Dublin City Libraries is the public library service for Dublin, Ireland. It is largest library authority in Ireland, serving over half a million people and around 2.6 million visits annually in 2015. It has a network of 21 branch libraries and a number of mobile library services.

== History ==
A free public library service in Dublin had its origins when a public meeting on 19 March 1877 prompted by the Dublin Municipal Council agreed to adopt the Public Libraries Act 1855 and requested the Dublin City Corporation apply its terms to Dublin. On 2 October 1884 two branch libraries were opened - one in Thomas Street, the other in Capel Street. Further branches were opened including Charleville Mall Library in 1899, Kevin Street in 1904, and Pearse Street in 1909. The Pearse Street branch had a difficult start as it was closed shortly after opening because of a lack of financial support for staff or books. However, with the philanthropic support of Andrew Carnegie it reopened in 1914. These branches ran as independent libraries until the 1930s when Dublin's first Chief Librarian, Roisin Walsh, was appointed in 1931 and organisational restructuring established the Dublin City Libraries as a centralised service.

== Branches ==
As of December 2023, Dublin City Libraries had 21 branches.

- Ballyfermot Library
- Ballymun Library
- Cabra Library
- Central Library
- Charleville Mall Library
- Coolock Library
- Dolphin's Barn Library
- Donaghmede Library
- Drumcondra Library
- Dublin City Library and Archive
- Finglas Library
- Inchicore Library
- Kevin Street Library
- Marino Library
- Pearse Street Library
- Pembroke Library
- Phibsboro Library
- Raheny Library
- Rathmines Library
- Ringsend Library
- Terenure Library
- Walkinstown Library

== Dublin City Library and Archive branch ==
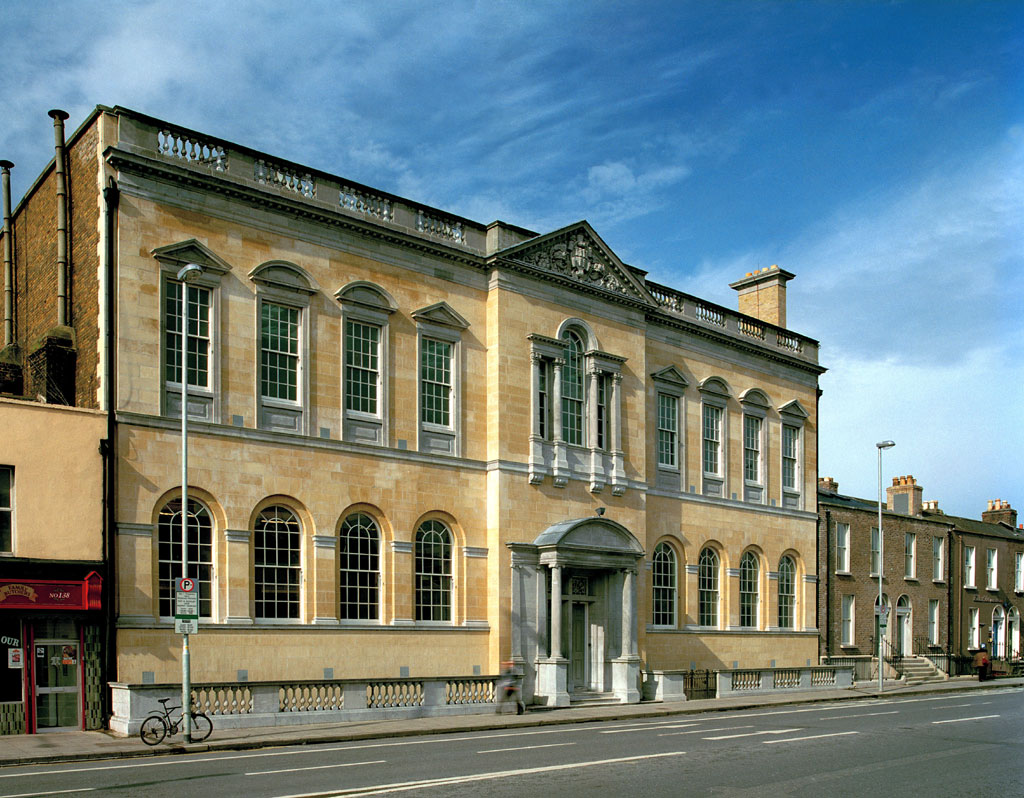
Dublin City Library and Archive, Pearse Street, Dublin

The Pearse Street branch, now known as Dublin City Library and Archive, was extensively renovated including an extension into two adjoining late-Georgian houses. It reopened in 2003.

This branch houses historic print collections including the Dublin City Archives, the Dublin and Irish Collection of books with imprints dating from the 19th century, the Dix Collection of mainly 17th and 18th century Dublin and Irish imprints, the Yeats Collection, the Children's Book Collection, imprints of publishers such as the Dun Emer and Cuala Press, and a collection of material dating from the 16th to 18th centuries with the Gilbert Collection forming the nucleus.

The Dublin City Archives contains records of the civic government of Dublin from 1171 to the late 20th century including Dublin City Council and committee minutes, account books, correspondence, reports, court records, charity petitions, title deeds, maps and plans and drawings all of which document the development of Dublin over eight centuries.

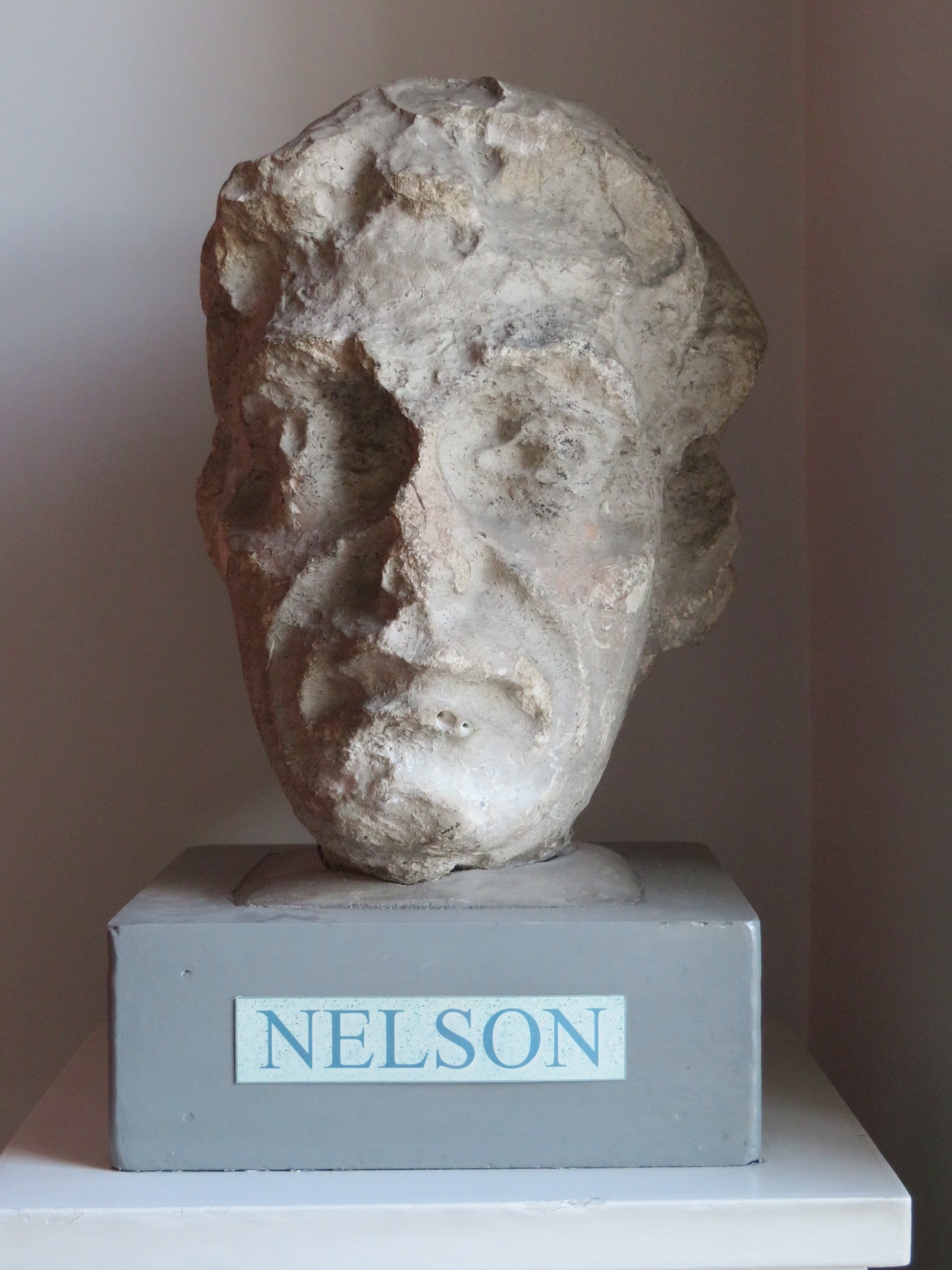
Bust of Horatio Nelson on display in the Library and Archive. The head was decapitated from Nelson's Pillar in O'Connell Street, Dublin by a terrorist bomb in 1966.

== Dublin City Carnegie Libraries ==
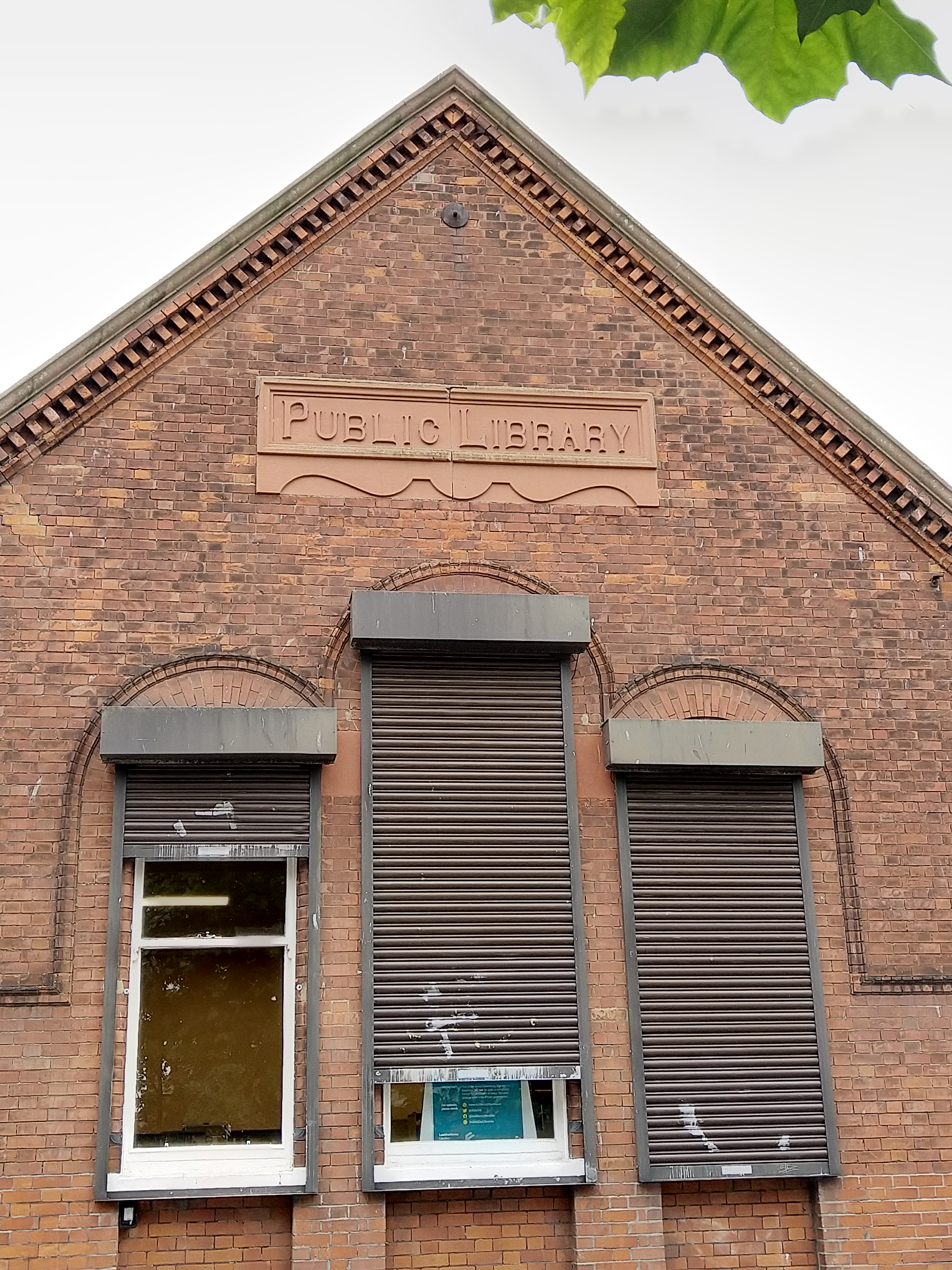
County Dublin - Charleville Mall Library - 20200907143550

The philanthropist Andrew Carnegie (1835–1919) funded the building of four Carnegie Libraries in the Dublin City Libraries branch network. These were:

- Charleville Mall Library, opened 1899
- Dublin City Library and Archive, Pearse Street, opened in 1909 and reopened following renovation in 2003
- Rathmines Library, built in 1913 and reopened following renovation in 2011
- Pembroke Library, built in 1927 and opened in 1929. This was the last Carnegie Library opened in Ireland.

== One Dublin One Book ==
Since 2006, Dublin City Libraries have promoted a particular book with a series of public events.

Year	Title	Author
2006	At Swim-Two-Birds (1939)	Flann O'Brien
2007	A Long Long Way (2005)	Sebastian Barry
2008	Gulliver's Travels (1726)	Jonathan Swift
2009	Dracula (1897)	Bram Stoker
2010	The Picture of Dorian Gray (1890)	Oscar Wilde
2011	Ghost Light (2010)	Joseph O'Connor
2012	Dubliners (1914)	James Joyce
2013	Strumpet City (1969)	James Plunkett
2014	If You Ever Go, poetry anthology, ed.	Pat Doran and Gerard Smyth
2015	The Barrytown Trilogy (1987–91)	Roddy Doyle
2016	Fallen (2014)	Lia Mills
2017	Echoland (2013)	Joe Joyce
2018	The Long Gaze Back: An Anthology of Irish Women Writers, ed.	Sinéad Gleeson
2019	The Country Girls Trilogy (1960–64)	Edna O'Brien
2020	Tatty (2004)	Christine Dwyer Hickey
2021	Leonard and Hungry Paul (2019)	Rónán Hession
2026	Christine Falls (2006)	John Banville

== Other activities ==
The International Dublin Literary Award is administered by Dublin City Libraries.

The application for designation as a UNESCO City of Literature, part of the Creative Cities Network was initiated and led by Dublin City Libraries.

== See also ==
- List of libraries in the Republic of Ireland
