= Horace Tennyson O'Rourke =

- Born: Horace Patrick Joseph O'Rourke; 21 March 1880; 34 Richmond Place North; Dublin
- Died: 30 December 1963 (aged 83); St John of God Hospital; Stillorgan
- Occupation: Architect
- Practice: Dublin Corporation

Horace Tennyson O'Rourke (21 March 1880 – 30 December 1963) was Dublin city architect for Dublin Corporation, now Dublin City Council, from 1922 to 1945.

== Biography ==
O'Rourke was born in Dublin, the son of Francis P. O'Rourke and Martha Rafferty. He was educated at the Christian Brothers-run O'Brien Institute, Dublin and subsequently at Dublin Municipal School of Art. From 1905 to 1916 he worked with a number of private architectural practices in Limerick and Dublin. His architectural output while in private practice up to 1916 included a range of public and private commissions.

In 1916, O'Rourke was appointed to the staff of the Dublin Corporation. He was assistant city architect to Charles J. McCarthy from 1918 to 1922, before his appointment as Dublin city architect. In this role, O'Rourke was responsible for leading the redesign and rebuilding of O'Connell Street and surrounding areas following damage during the Easter Rising and Irish Civil War. He undertook the reconstruction of Charlemont House as an art gallery and civic museum. In 1924 he became a fellow of the Royal Institute of the Architects of Ireland.

Despite being a traditionalist in his style and preference, he took a close interest in town planning and was said to be "the driving force behind" the Dublin Civic Survey of 1925. He was an active member of the Dublin Civic Week committees in 1927 and 1929, and most of his public addresses and pronouncements during the 1930s were more concerned with town planning than architecture. He became a member of the Royal Town Planning Institute, which awarded him a distinction in town planning in 1942. His works include 298 rental houses in Cabra for Dublin Corporation in 1930.

== Publications ==
- O'Rourke, Horace Tennyson, & the Dublin Civic Survey Committee (1925) The Dublin Civic Survey for the Civics Institute of Ireland, Liverpool: University Press of Liverpool
