= Service Medal (1917–1921) =

Irish military award

Service Medal (1917–1921) An Bonn Seirbhíse
- Awarded for: Military service between 1916 and 11 July 1921
- Presented by: Ireland
- Eligibility: Those who are entitled to a military pension for service between 1916 and 11 July 1921 (Class A), and those who were members of the Irish Republican Army, Fianna Éireann, Cumann na mBan or the Irish Citizen Army for the three months ending on 11 July 1921 (Class B)
- Established: 26 May 1942
- Ribbon for the Service Medal (1917–1921)

The Service Medal (1917–1921) (Irish: An Bonn Seirbhíse) is a military decoration of the Republic of Ireland, awarded in two classes (A and B) to those who served during the Irish War of Independence. It was established on 26 May 1942 after a recommendation by the Minister for Defence, Oscar Traynor T.D.

== Description ==
The bronze circular medal is approximately 39mm in diameter. The obverse bears the arms of the four provinces of Ireland and the image of a flying column guerrilla member in the centre, with the word Éire ("Ireland") across the middle. At the bottom is the phrase Cogaḋ na Saoirse ("The Fight for Freedom"). The reverse side depicts a palm leaf around one side of the medal, symbolic of victory.

The ribbon is two vertical panels of black and tan, symbolic of the Irish War of Independence and the fight against British "Black and Tans" (paramilitary auxiliaries of the RIC). The ribbon's suspension bar has a Celtic interlaced pattern. The service bar joined to the suspender bears the inscription Comrac ("Combat") with a St. Brendan's Knot at each side.

== Eligibility ==
Class A is a medal with bar awarded "to persons who are in possession of a military service certificate entitling them to a pension under the Military Service Pensions Acts in respect of active service in the period subsequent to 1916 and prior to 11 July 1921 and to those persons not in possession of a certificate who satisfy the Minister for Defence that had they applied for a pension, their service was such as would have merited the award of a pension." There were two types of medal with bar, named and unnamed, although there was no difference in their design. Named medals were awarded to those who were killed in action or who had died between the end of the war and the issuing of medals in 1941.

Class B is a medal without bar awarded " to persons who were members of the Irish Republican Army (Óglaigh na hÉireann), Fianna Éireann, Cumann na mBan or the Irish Citizen Army for the three months ending on 11 July 1921."

Awards can also be granted posthumously.

== Posthumous recipients ==
- Mary Sheldreck, member of Cumann na mBan who was killed during the 1916 Easter Rising, whose posthumous award was presented to her father Thomas Sheldreck
- Terence MacSwiney, awarded in 2021 and presented to his grandchildren
- Patrick Tierney
- Sean O'Carroll
