= Kit Poole =

Irish revolutionary (1875–1965)

Christopher "Kit" Poole
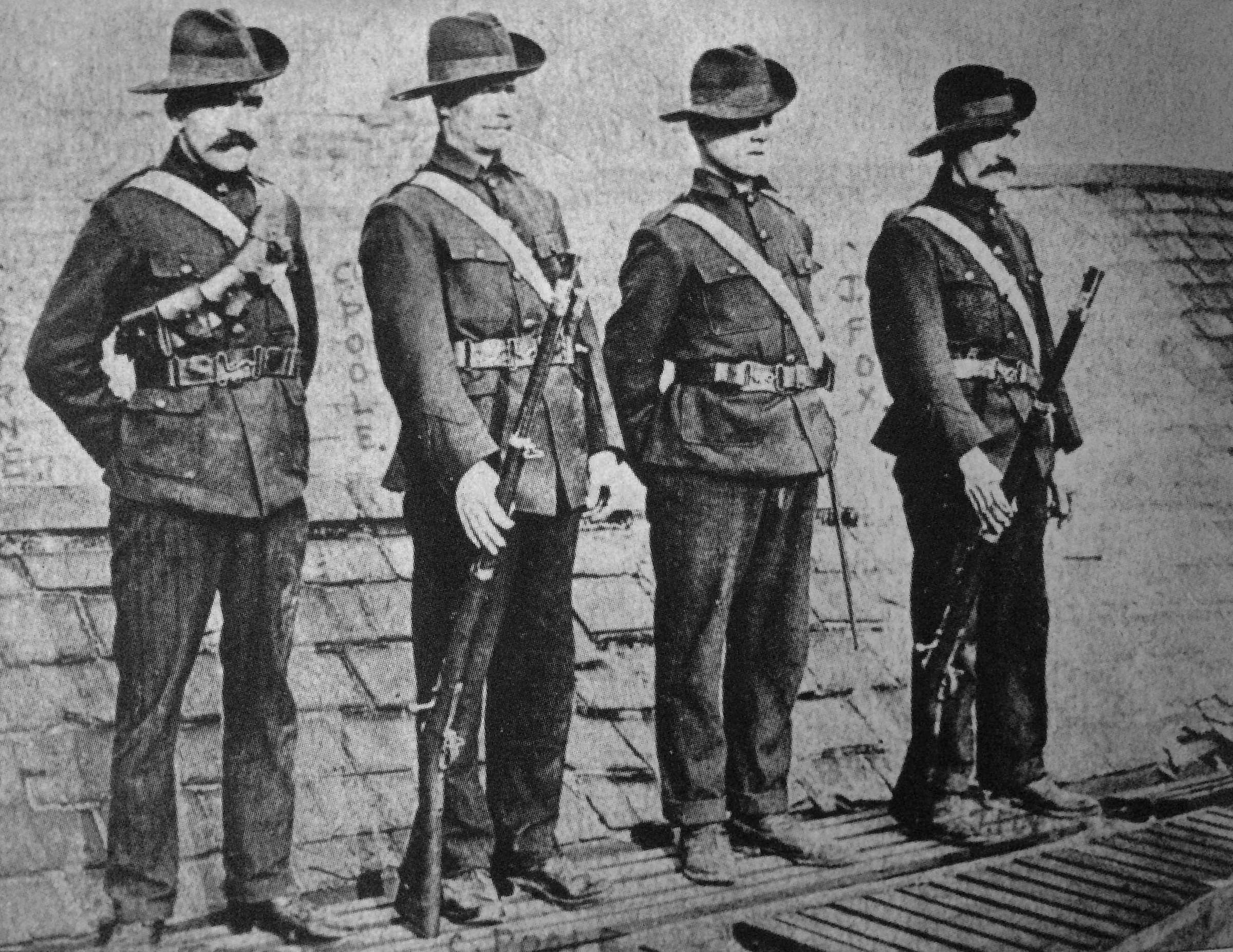
- Poole (second from left) atop a building with three other Irish Citizen Army members
- Born: 17 December 1875; Dublin, Ireland
- Died: 27 November 1965 (aged 89); Dublin, Ireland
- Spouse: Alice Fay
- Military career
- Allegiance: United Kingdom (1894–1906); Irish Republic (1913–1918)
- Service years: 1894–1906 British Army; 1913–1918 Irish Citizen Army
- Rank: Private (British Army); Captain (Irish Citizen Army)
- Unit: 2nd East Yorkshire Regiment (UK)
- Commands: Second-in-command of Irish Citizen Army, St Stephen's Green Garrison, Easter Week, 1916
- Conflicts: Tirah Campaign; Second Boer War; Easter Rising
- Awards: King's South Africa Medal (1901 & 1902 clasps); Queen's South Africa Medal (1902)

Christopher "Kit" Poole (17 December 1875 – 27 November 1965) was an Irish soldier and military tactician who fought in the Tirah Campaign and the Second Boer War as a British Army private, as well as a captain of the Irish Citizen Army during the Easter Rising. During the Citizen Army's inception in 1913, he was a member of the group's initial provisional council alongside Captain Jack White, James Larkin, P. T. Daly and Constance Markievicz, and would go on to take up a permanent position on its executive committee. He was also a pivotal figure during the 1916 Easter Rising, as second-in-command at St. Stephen's Green under Citizen Army commandant Michael Mallin where they held out for six days against British forces, ending the engagement when the British brought them a copy of Pearse's surrender order.

== Early life ==
Christopher Damian Poole was born on Capel Street in Dublin, the second of six children to parents Frederick Poole, a tailor, and Mary Jane Madden, a housewife. Poole grew up in a nationalist environment; Joseph Poole, his older brother and member of the Fenian Brotherhood, was executed in 1883 for a murder which he did not commit. His other brothers; Vincent, John Denis, Patrick, and Patrick's son, John, took active roles in the Rising and the Civil War.

== Enlistment & Service in British Army ==
Poole enlisted with the British army at the age of 18 (30/7/94) and was assigned to the 2nd East Yorkshire Regiment alongside his future commandant, Michael Mallin. Poole served for a period in South Africa, earning the Queen's South Africa Medal and two King's South Africa Medal clasps for his service during the Boer War, after which he retired from British Military Service.

== Irish Citizen Army ==
Six years after returning to Ireland, Poole was elected to the founding provisional committee of the Irish Citizen Army alongside Jack White, Constance Markievicz and Jim Larkin. On 22 March 1914, Larkin presided at a meeting reconstituting the ICA. Primarily Larkin, Seán O’Casey, Markievicz and other members of the ITGWU drew up a new constitution, calling for an ‘army council’ and included explicitly nationalist aims. The committee consisted of Poole, T. Blair, John Bohan, T. Burke, P. Coady, P. Fogarty, P.J. Fox, Thomas Healy, T. Kennedy, J. MacGowan, Michael Mallin, P. Morgan, F. Moss, P. O’Brien and John Shelly.

Poole's reputation while fighting in South Africa had made an impression on founder Jack White and his eventual fellow soldiers while fighting at Stephen's Green. Poole also owned the only Lee Enfield rifle in possession of the army at its inception, and would go on to train enlistees how to carry weapons (hurley sticks were used in training to simulate the weight of the rifles) prior to entering battle.

Poole formed an important part of the honour guard during the iconic raising of the harped flag over Liberty Hall in the run up to Easter 1916, escorting Molly O'Reilly, colour bearer and representative of Women's Worker's Union, and a colour guard of 16 men as they made their way to raise the flag.

=== Easter Rising & The Battle of St. Stephen's Green ===
During the Easter Rising, Poole was Commandant Mallin's most senior officer, earning him the rank of captain and placing him third in hierarchal command of the ICA after Connolly and Mallin. After the insurgents took control of the Green and the civilians were evacuated, Poole allocated a company of men to secure each gate entrance. Gates were barricaded with wheelbarrows, gardening tools and park benches. Meanwhile, Poole ordered a number of men to dig slit trenches and foxholes in the style he had used prior in South Africa.

Poole aiming his rifle alongside other Citizen Army members

When Mallin ordered the evacuation of the Green on Tuesday 25 April, Poole organised the fall back to the Royal College of Surgeons which had been secured by Constance Markievicz prior. When it came to evacuating the park due to heavy fire Poole mustered remaining men at the Park entrance, sending them in separate sections at regular intervals out the West gate towards the college.

After Padraig Pearse's surrender order was accepted by the British side, Poole was tried and sent to Stafford Jail detention barracks in England before being transferred to Frongoch internment camp in Wales with the majority of the remaining soldiers. He was released under the general amnesty of Christmas 1916.

=== Raiding the Defiance ===
Following the Rising, a significant challenge for the ICA was the sourcing of weapons and ammunition. On the Dublin docks in 1918, Poole led a battalion of ICA men and secured a huge windfall of ammunition from an American transport vessel, the Defiance, which had served as a cargo ship in the United States Navy during the late stages of the Great War. Arms expert Seamus McGowan was smuggled aboard in as a docker who then allowed the rest of Poole's men to come aboard when all was clear.

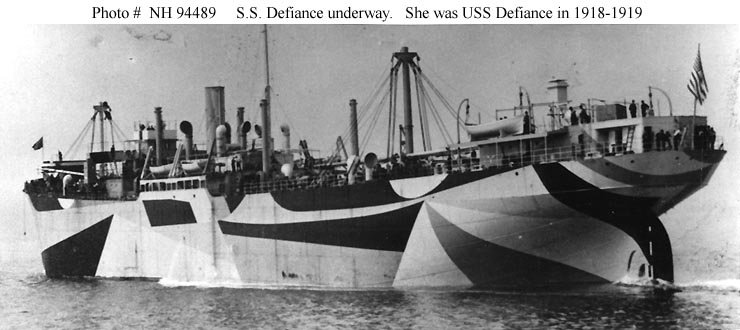
USS Defiance

According to R.M Fox's The History of the Irish Citizen Army, "cases had to be broken open in the hold by dockers without being observed by the guards. Then all the stuff had to be concealed to get it across the gangway. No parcels were allowed. In spite of all the difficulties the booty was too valuable to lose, and relays of Citizen Army men were down on the quays for eight hours a day, taking the revolvers and ammunition from those who succeeded in getting the necessary shore permits."

The munitions haul yielded 56 .45 revolvers, 2,000 rounds of revolver ammunition, 5,000 rounds of Springfield ammunition in canvas bandoliers and an assortment of Verey lights and pistols. Arrangements were also made with a member of the crew to deliver 34 .45 automatics, which had been served out to the crew.
