= St Stephen's Green =

Public park in Dublin, Ireland

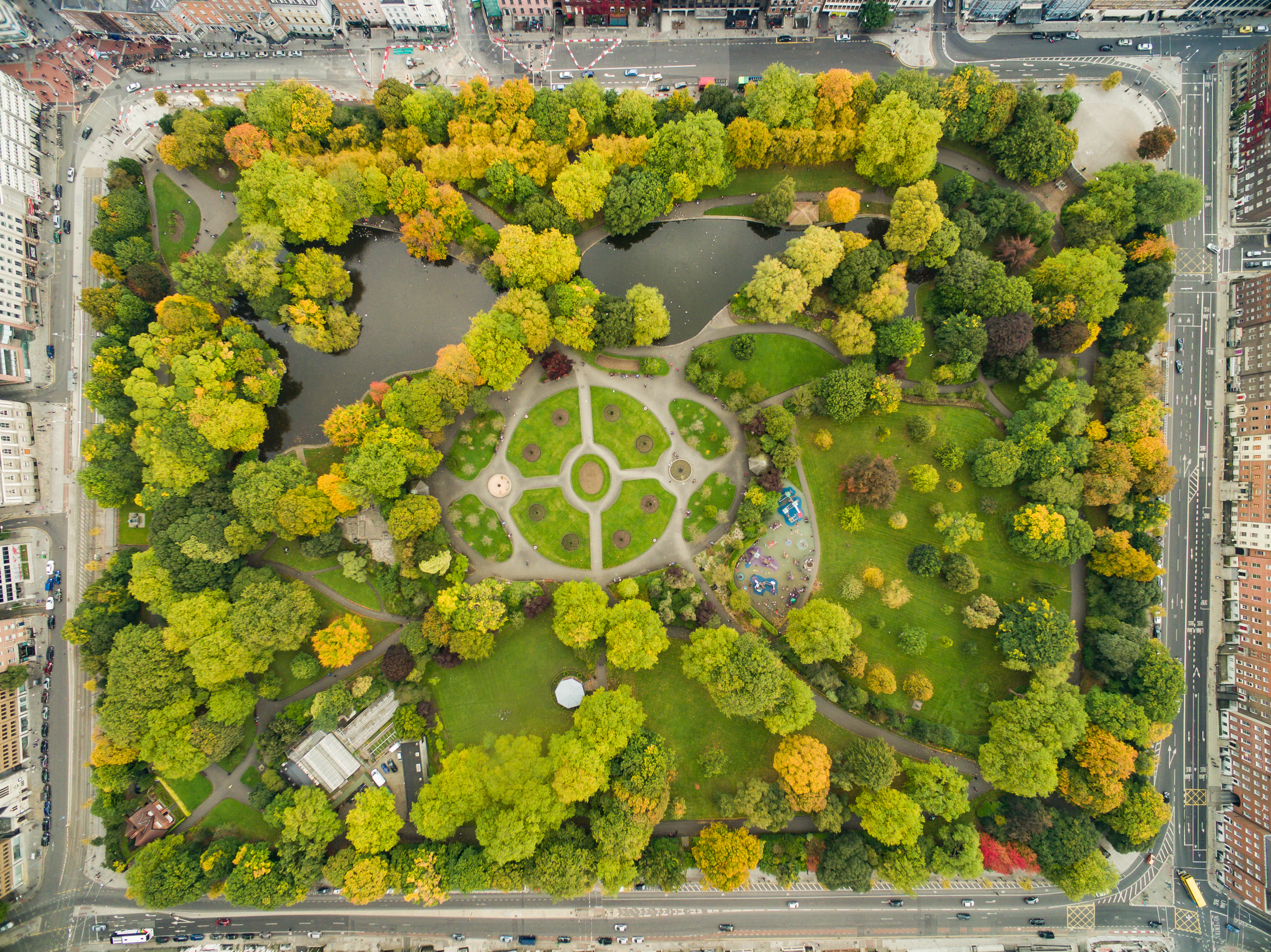
- Aerial view of St Stephen's Green

- Location within Central Dublin Location within Dublin Location within Ireland
- Interactive fullscreen map
- Type: City park
- Location: Dublin, Ireland
- Coordinates: 53°20′17″N 6°15′33″W
- Area: 8.9 ha (22 acres)
- Created: 1664
- Operator: Office of Public Works
- Status: Open all year
- Public transit: St Stephen's Green station
- Website: ststephensgreenpark.ie

National monument of Ireland
- Official name: St. Stephen's Green

St Stephen's Green (Irish: Faiche Stiabhna) is a garden square and public park located in the city centre of Dublin, Ireland. The current landscape of the park was designed by William Sheppard. It was officially re-opened to the public on Tuesday, 27 July 1880 by Lord Ardilaun. The square is adjacent to one of Dublin's main shopping streets, Grafton Street, and to a shopping centre named after it, while on its surrounding streets are the offices of a number of public bodies as well as a stop on one of Dublin's Luas tram lines. It is often informally called Stephen's Green. At 22 acres (8.9 ha), it is the largest of the parks in Dublin's main Georgian garden squares. Others include nearby Merrion Square and Fitzwilliam Square.

The park is rectangular, surrounded by streets that once formed major traffic arteries through Dublin city centre, although traffic management changes implemented in 2004 during the course of the Luas works have greatly reduced the volume of traffic. These four bordering streets are called, respectively, St Stephen's Green North, St Stephen's Green South, St Stephen's Green East and St Stephen's Green West.

== History ==
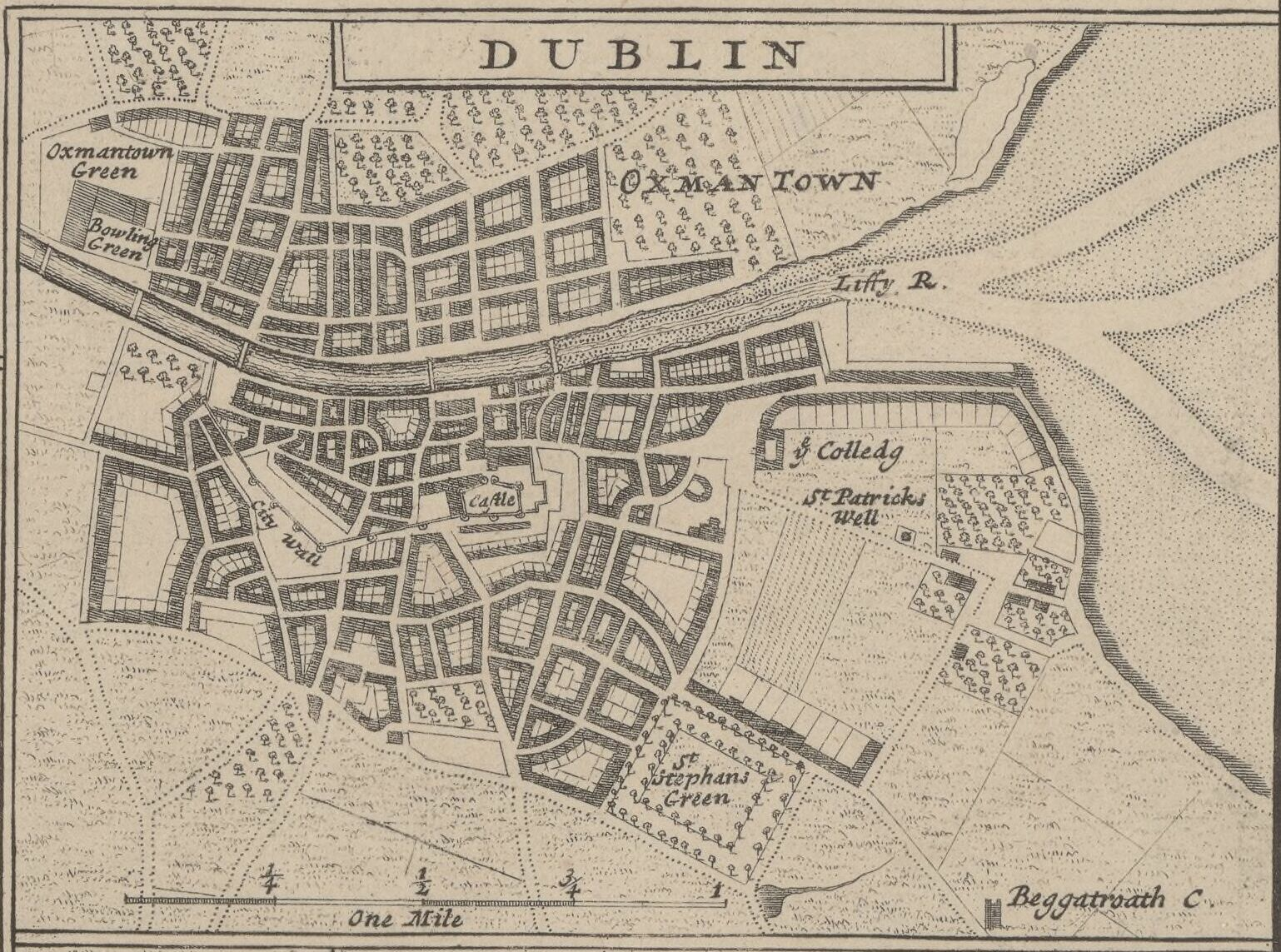
St Stephen's Green, Herman Moll's 1714 map of Dublin

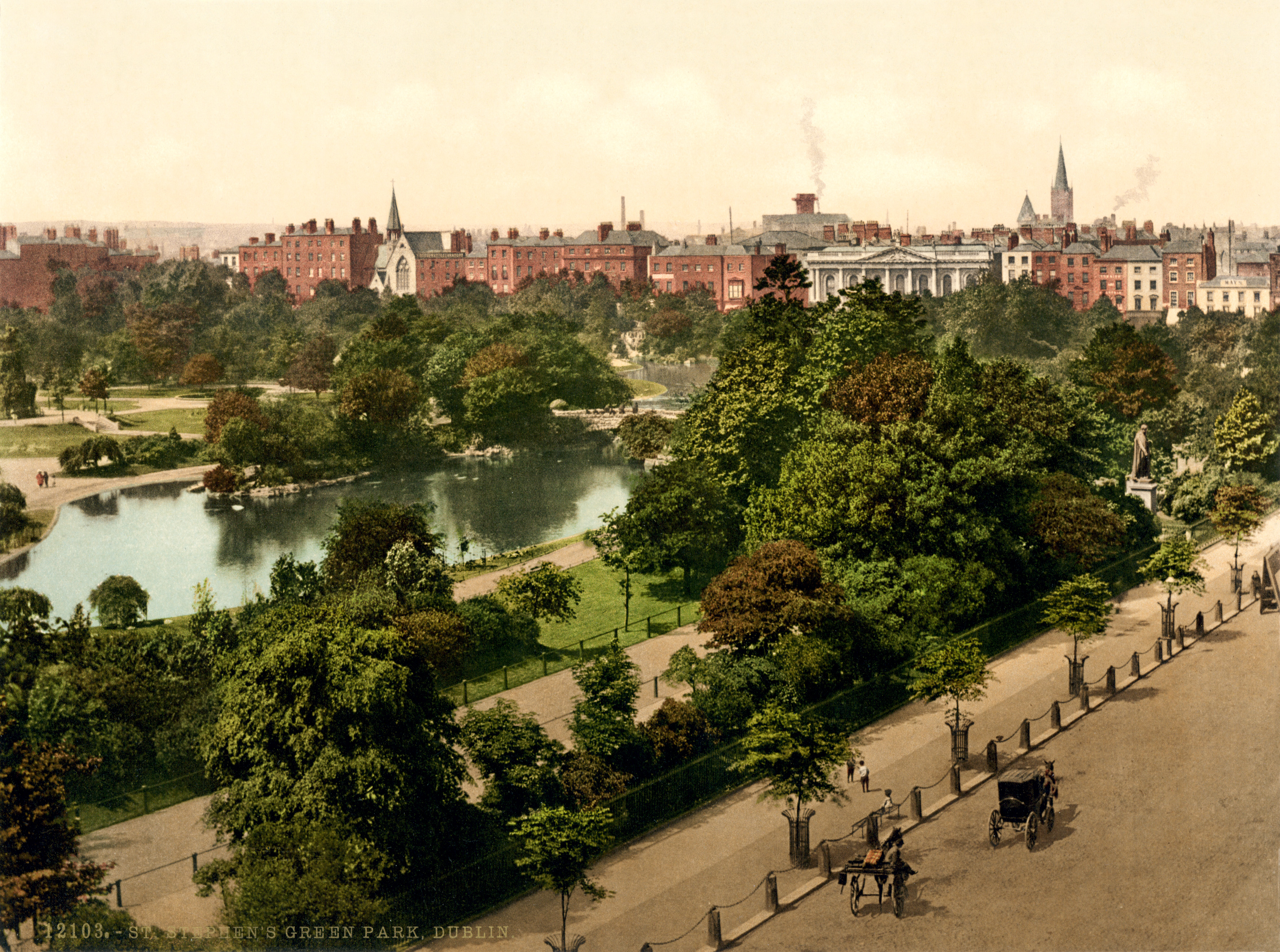
Photochrom print showing the green at the end of the 19th century

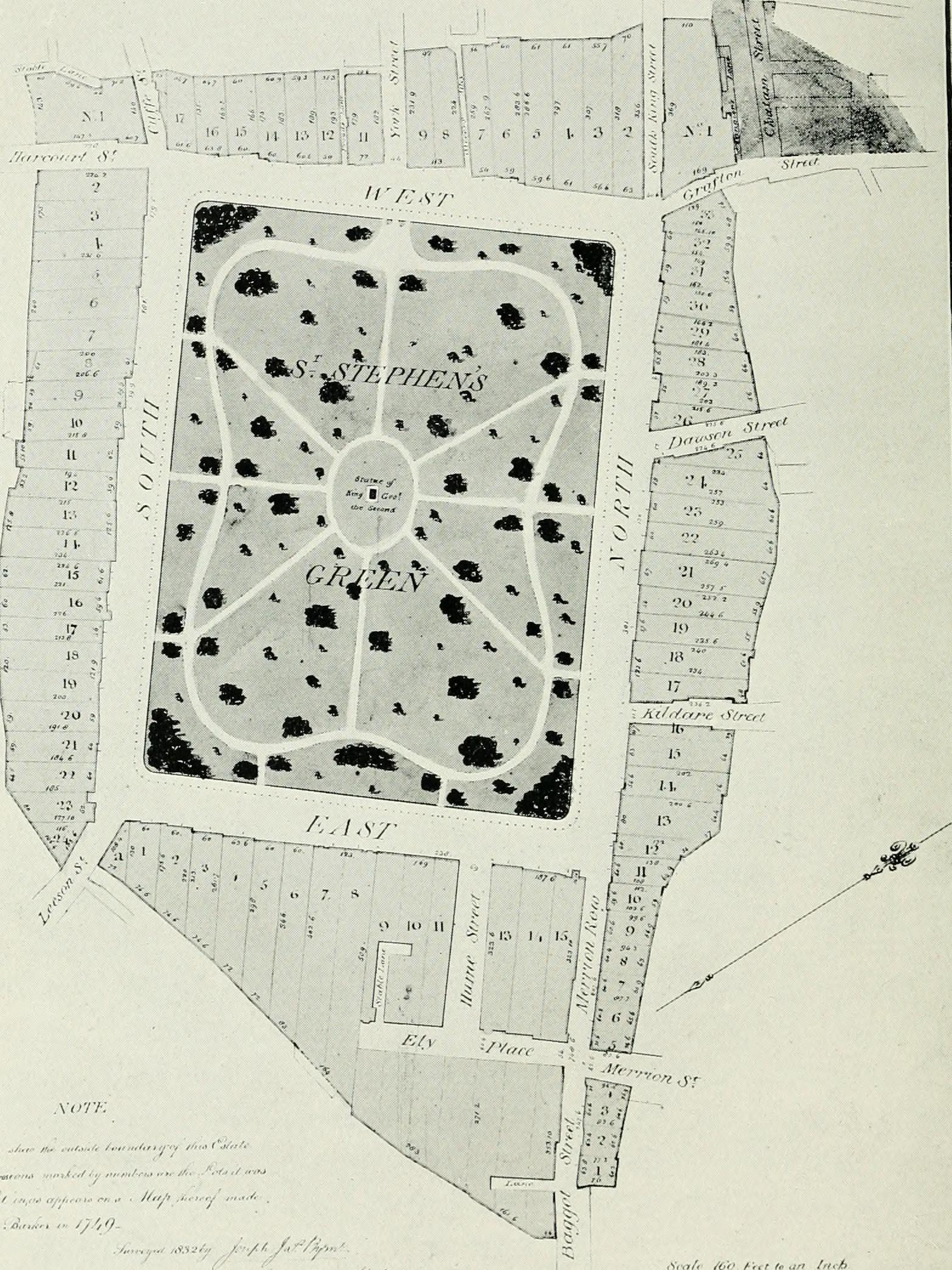
The Green in 1832

The association with St Stephen has its origins in a medieval leper hospital, now Mercer's Hospital, dedicated to Saint Stephen on nearby Stephen Street. Until 1663, St Stephen's Green was a marshy common on the edge of Dublin of approximately 60 acres, used for grazing. In that year Dublin Corporation, seeing an opportunity to raise much-needed revenue, decided to enclose the centre of the common and to sell land around the perimeter for building. The area was surveyed by Robert Newcomen, with the land divided into 96 plots with a green of 27 acres in the centre. The park was enclosed with a wall in 1664. Early tenants built simple two-storey houses, with much of it undeveloped on the 1728 map. By the time of John Roque's map in 1756, the pace of building had accelerated rapidly. The houses built around the Green were rapidly replaced by new buildings in the Georgian style and by the end of the eighteenth century the Green was a place of resort for the better-off of the city. Most of the present-day landscape of the square comprises townhouses from the 18th and 19th centuries.

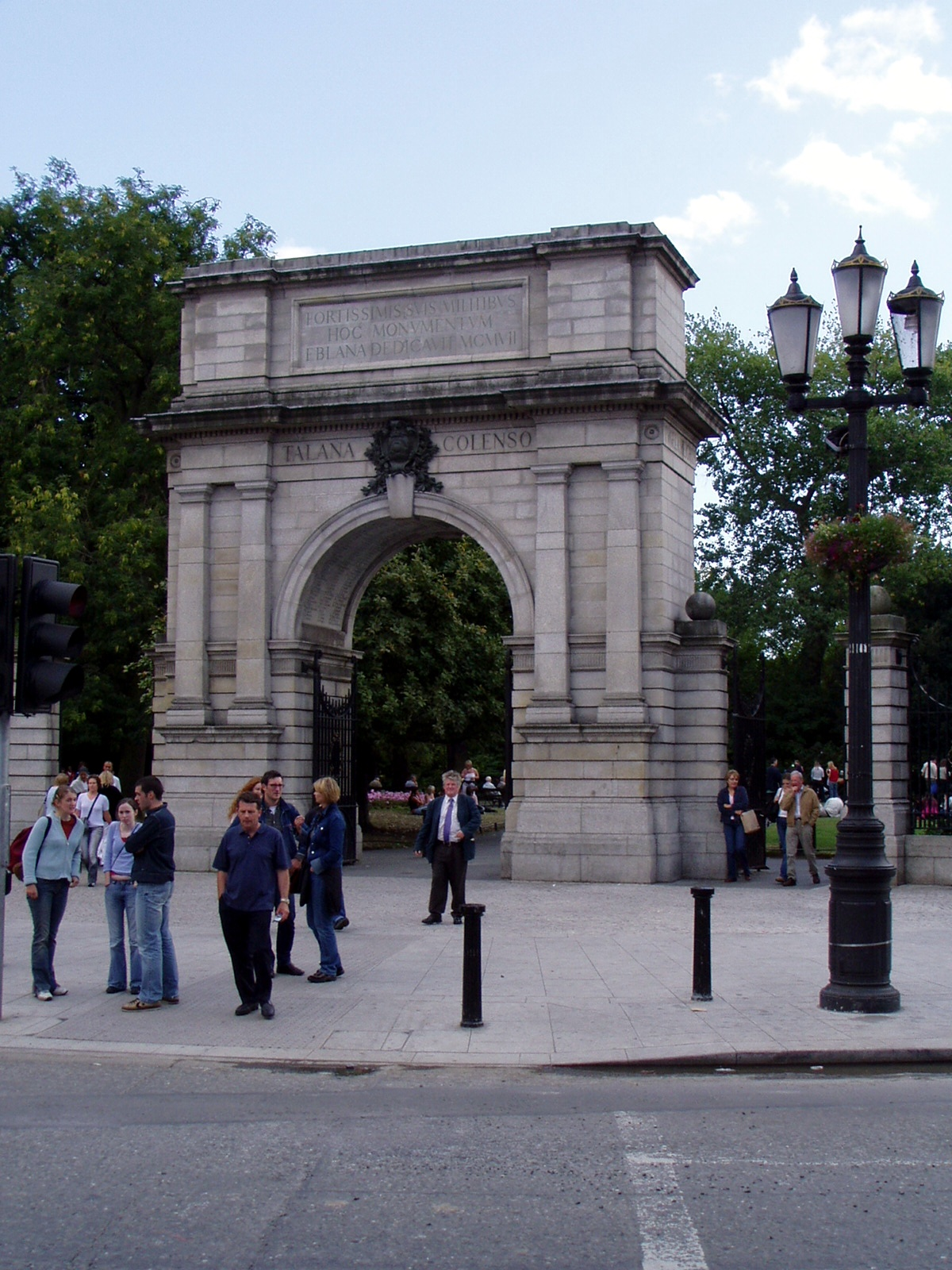
Fusiliers' Arch, erected in 1907

Saint Stephen's Green (Dublin) Improvement Act 1814
- Act of Parliament
- Parliament of the United Kingdom
- Long title: An Act for the Improvement of the square called Saint Stephen's Green in the city of Dublin.
- Citation: 54 Geo. 3. c. ccviii

Dates
- Royal assent: 18 July 1814
Other legislation
Repealed by	Saint Stephen's Green (Dublin) Act 1877

Status: Repealed

The Saint Stephen's Green (Dublin) Improvement Act 1814 (54 Geo. 3. c. ccviii) passed control of St Stephen's Green to commissioners for the local householders, who redesigned its layout and replaced the walls with railings.

After the death of Prince Albert, Queen Victoria suggested that St Stephen's Green be renamed Albert Green and have a statue of Albert at its centre, a suggestion rejected with indignation by the Dublin Corporation and the people of the city, to the Queen's chagrin.

Saint Stephen's Green (Dublin) Act 1877
- Act of Parliament
- Parliament of the United Kingdom
- Long title: An Act to vest Saint Stephen's Green, Dublin, in the Commissioners of Public Works in Ireland; for maintaining and regulating the same as a Public Park; and for other purposes.
- Citation: 40 & 41 Vict. c. cxxxiv

Dates
- Royal assent: 23 July 1877
Other legislation
Repeals/revokes	Saint Stephen's Green (Dublin) Improvement Act 1814

Text of statute as originally enacted

Access to the Green was restricted to local residents, until 1877, when Parliament passed the Saint Stephen's Green (Dublin) Act 1877 (40 & 41 Vict. c. cxxxiv) to reopen St Stephen's Green to the public, at the initiative of Sir Arthur Guinness, a member of the Guinness brewing family who lived at St Anne's Park, Raheny and at Ashford Castle. He later paid for the laying out of the Green in approximately its current form, which took place in 1880, and gave it to the Corporation, as representatives of the people. By way of thanks, the city commissioned a statue of him, which faces the College of Surgeons. His brother Edward lived at Iveagh House, which his descendants gave in 1939 to the Department of External Affairs (now the Department of Foreign Affairs and Trade).

During the Easter Rising of 1916, a group of rebels made up mainly of members of the Irish Citizen Army, under the command of Commandant Michael Mallin, his second-in-command Kit Poole, and Constance Markievicz, established a position in St Stephen's Green. They numbered between 200 and 250. They confiscated motor vehicles to establish roadblocks on the streets that surround the park, and dug defensive positions in the park itself. This approach differed from that of taking up positions in buildings, adopted elsewhere in the city. It proved to have been unwise when elements of the British Army took up positions in the Shelbourne Hotel, at the northeastern corner of St Stephen's Green, overlooking the park, from which they could shoot down into the entrenchments. Finding themselves in a weak position, the Volunteers withdrew to the Royal College of Surgeons on the west side of the Green. During the Rising, gunfire was temporarily halted to allow the park's groundsman to feed the local ducks. Mary Sheldreck, a member of the women's paramilitary organisation Cumann na mBan, was with Constance Markievicz in St Stephen's Green and died from injuries sustained during the Rising.

A statue of Archibald Montgomerie, 13th Earl of Eglinton by Patrick MacDowell was erected on the North side of the green in 1866. It was destroyed in an explosion by the IRA, which injured gardaí and civilians in 1958, and the remains were dismantled.

The park is now operated by the Office of Public Works (OPW) on behalf of the Irish state.

== Park ==
=== Evolution of design ===
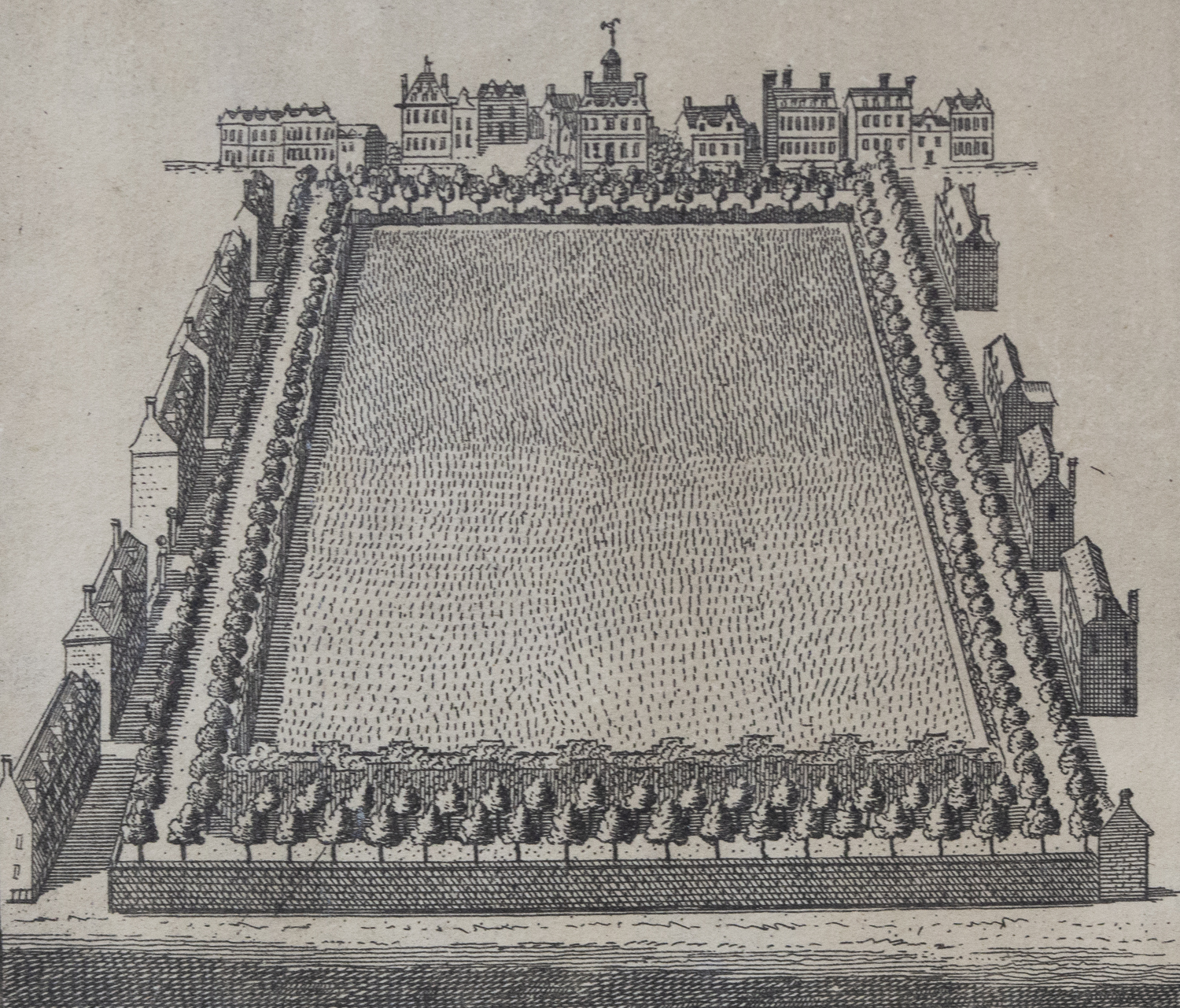
Prospect of St Stephen's Green, taken from Charles Brooking's map of Dublin (1728)

The landscaping of the park has undergone three major changes since its inception. Its first major change occurred in 1670: two rows of lime trees were planted around the perimeter, functioning as its first enclosure. The marshy ground was drained using a ditch at the perimeter. At this time, the park was only accessible to the wealthy residents who owned plots around the park. In 1815 the park was redesigned by the Dublin city surveyor Arthur Neville. In his redesign, he added winding pathways and iron fences. At this time, the park was still closed to the public.

During the 1860s, the campaign to make the park publicly accessible was underway, and the city engineer, George W. Hemans, proposed a new design to make the park as walkable and as functionally practical as possible. This included creating four gates at each corner of the park that would be linked by the extant pathways designed by Neville. This plan was eventually abandoned, most likely due to the fact that Hemans was employed by Dublin Corporation. However, many of Hemans' designs, like the addition of the gates and connecting pathways, were included in the final plans submitted by William Sheppard, the principal designer responsible for the landscape of the park as we know it today, and engineer A.L. Cousins, sponsored by Lord Ardilaun. Ardilaun also played a significant role in the planning and importing of the exotic trees and plants that would be installed in the park.

=== Layout ===
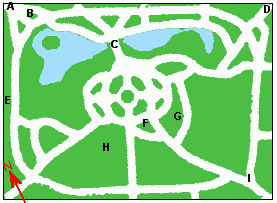
Map of Green with some key features: (A) Fusiliers' Arch (B) O'Donovan Rossa (C) O'Connell Bridge (D) WolfeTone & Famine Memorial (E) Lord Ardilaun (F) Markievicz (G) Playground (H) Bandstand (I) Three Fates

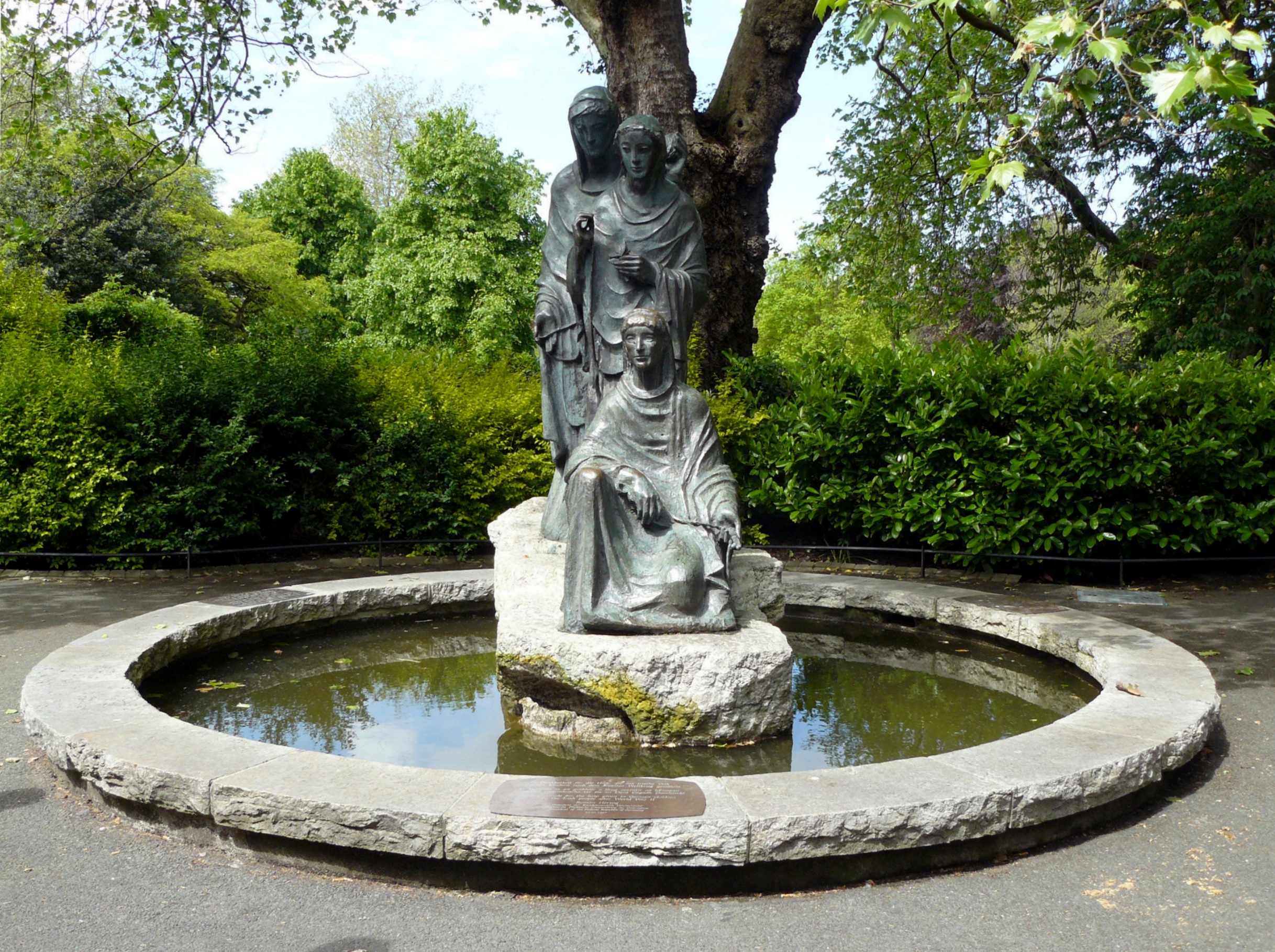
Three Fates statue

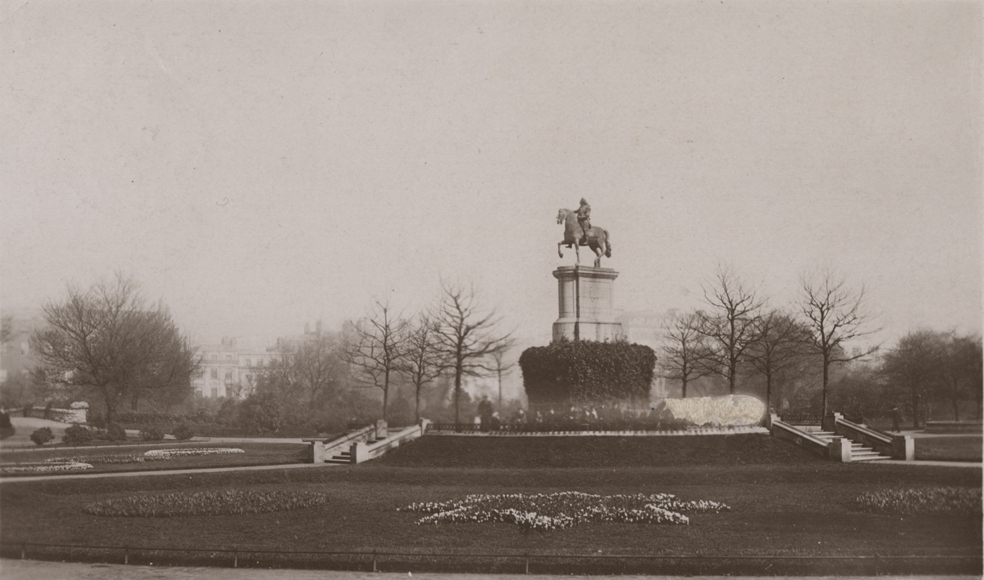
Statue of George II, which stood from 1758 to 1937

While the central park of St Stephen's Green is one of three ancient commons in the city, its current layout owes much to the restorations of the 19th century. Architectural history professor Christine Casey states that this restoration obscures what would have been its most impressive feature to 18th-century visitors, its large size. The grounds are roughly rectangular, measuring (approximately) 550 by 450 metres, and are centred on a formal garden.

By 1758, the tree-lined walks around the park had been named, Beaux Walk to the north, Leeson's Walk to the south, Monck's Walk to the east, and French Walk to the west.

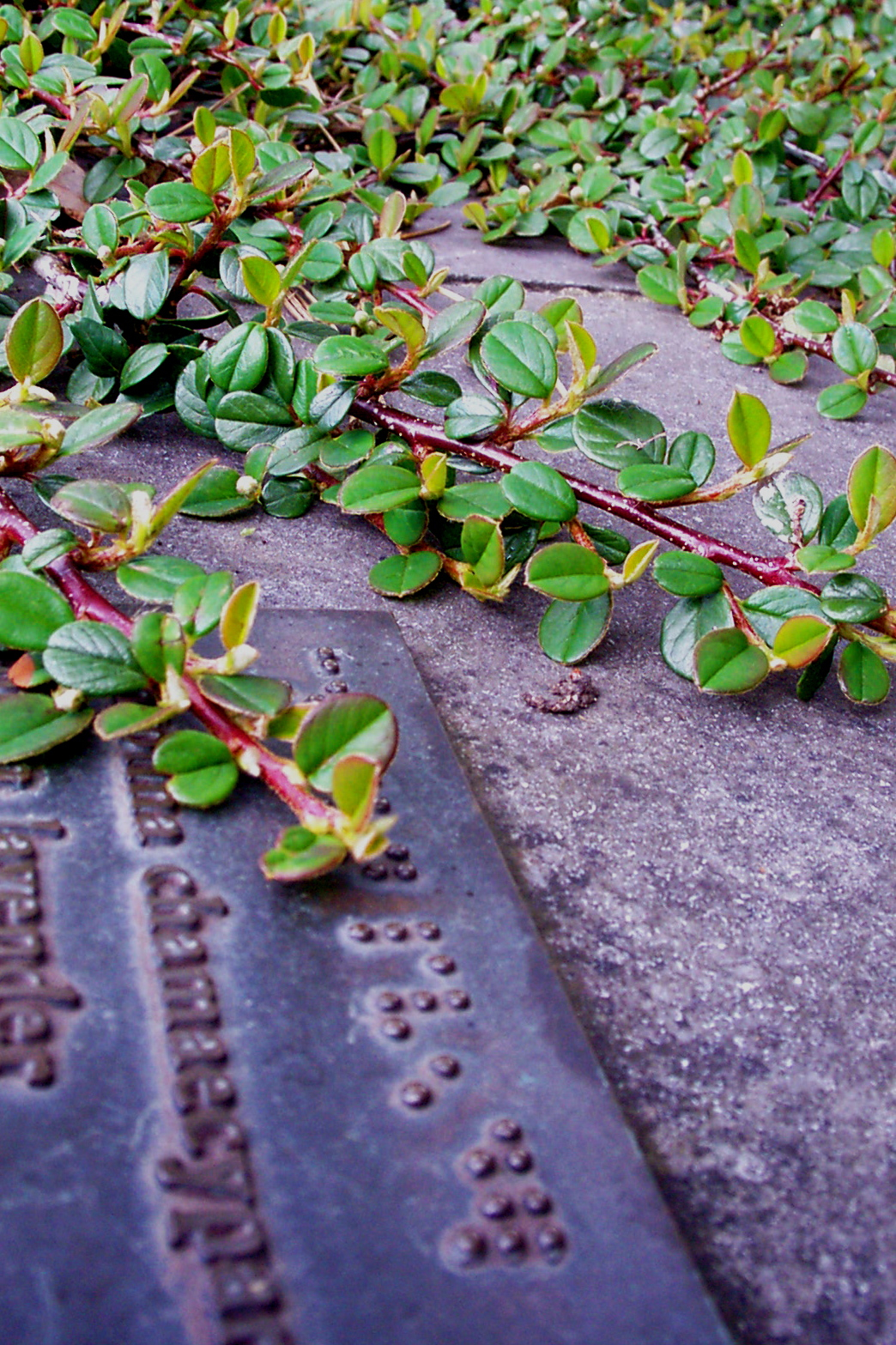
Braille notice next to Cotoneaster

One of the more unusual aspects of the park lies on the northwest corner of this central area, a garden for the blind with scented plants, which can withstand handling, and are labelled in Braille.

Further north again (and spanning much of the length of the park) is a large lake. Home to ducks and other water fowl, the lake is fed by an artificial waterfall, spanned by O'Connell bridge, and fronted by an ornamental gazebo. The lakes in the park are fed from the Grand Canal at Portobello.

To the south side of the main garden circle is more open heath surrounding a bandstand, and often frequented by lunching students, workers and shoppers on Dublin's sunnier days.

There is also a playground (separated into junior and senior areas) which was refurbished in 2010.

The park once featured a statue of King George II on horseback by John van Nost, erected in 1758, until it was blown up in 1937 by Irish Republicans, the day after the coronation of George VI.

Other features include:

- the Fusiliers' Arch at the Grafton Street corner which commemorates the Royal Dublin Fusiliers who died in the Second Boer War.
- a fountain representing the Three Fates inside the Leeson Street gate. The statue was designed by Joseph Wackerle in bronze in 1956. It was a gift from the German people in thanks for Irish help to refugee children following World War II. Up to five hundred children found foster homes in Ireland in a project named Operation Shamrock.
- a seated statue of Lord Ardilaun on the western side, the man who gave the Green to the city, facing the Royal College of Surgeons which he also sponsored (again, see History above)
- the W. B. Yeats memorial garden with a sculpture by Henry Moore
- a bust of James Joyce facing his former university at Newman House
- a memorial to the Fenian leader Jeremiah O'Donovan Rossa near the Grafton Street entrance
- a bronze statue at the Merrion Row corner of Theobald Wolfe Tone, the leader of the 1798 rebellion.
- a memorial to the Great Famine of 1845–1850 by Edward Delaney
- a bust of Countess Constance Markievicz on the south of the central garden (see History above)
- a statue of Robert Emmet standing opposite his birthplace (now demolished) at No 124.
- a memorial bust of war poet Tom Kettle, who was killed in action while serving in the Royal Dublin Fusiliers during the Battle of Ginchy in September 1916. As Irish republicanism traditionally viewed Irishmen who served in the British armed forces during World War I as traitors, the placement of a commemorative bust of Kettle was beset by controversy until it was finally placed in 1937, without an official unveiling, in the centre section.
- a bust of Bengal Renaissance poet Rabindranath Tagore was erected in the park in 2011.

== Architecture ==
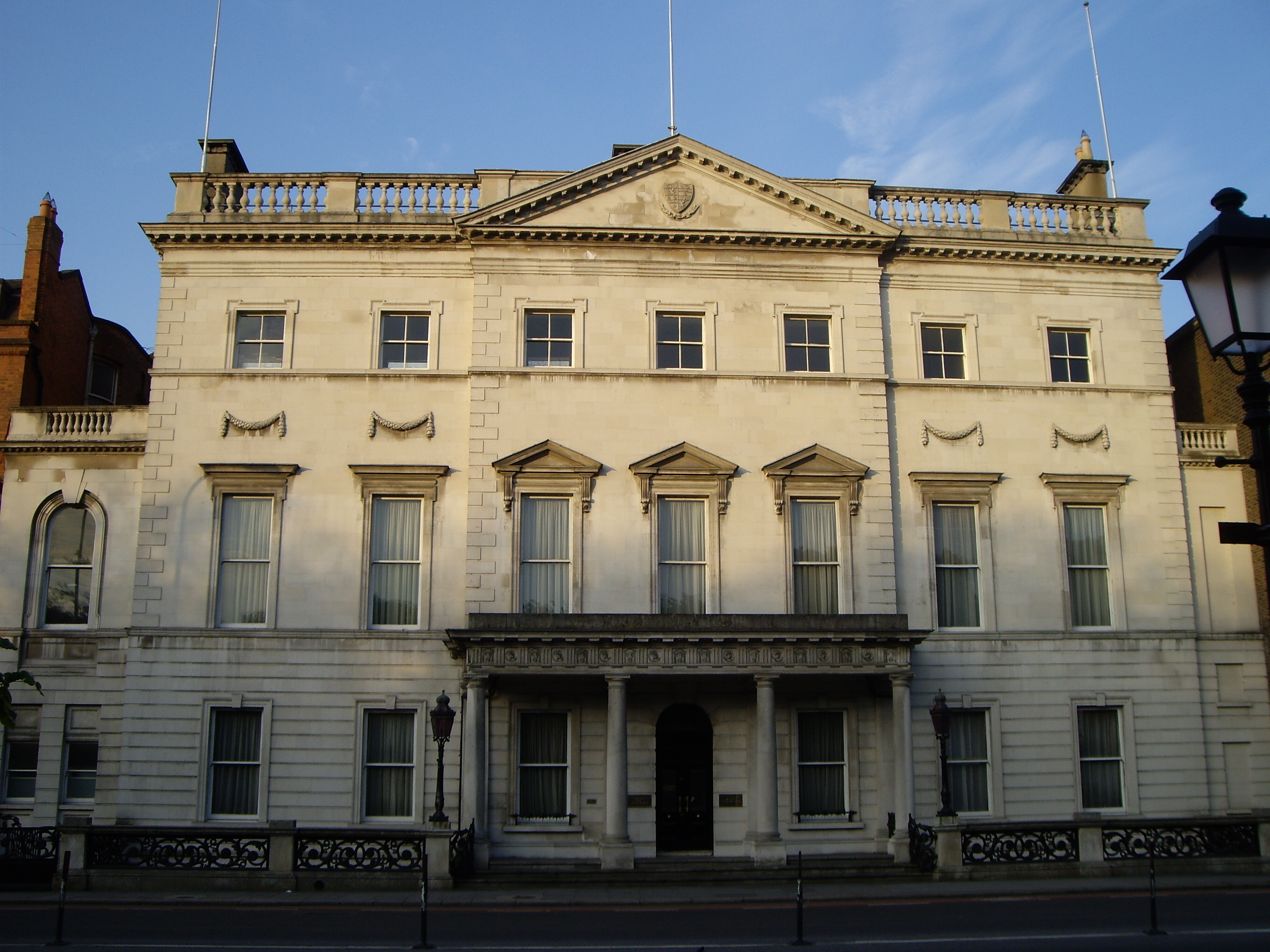
Iveagh House

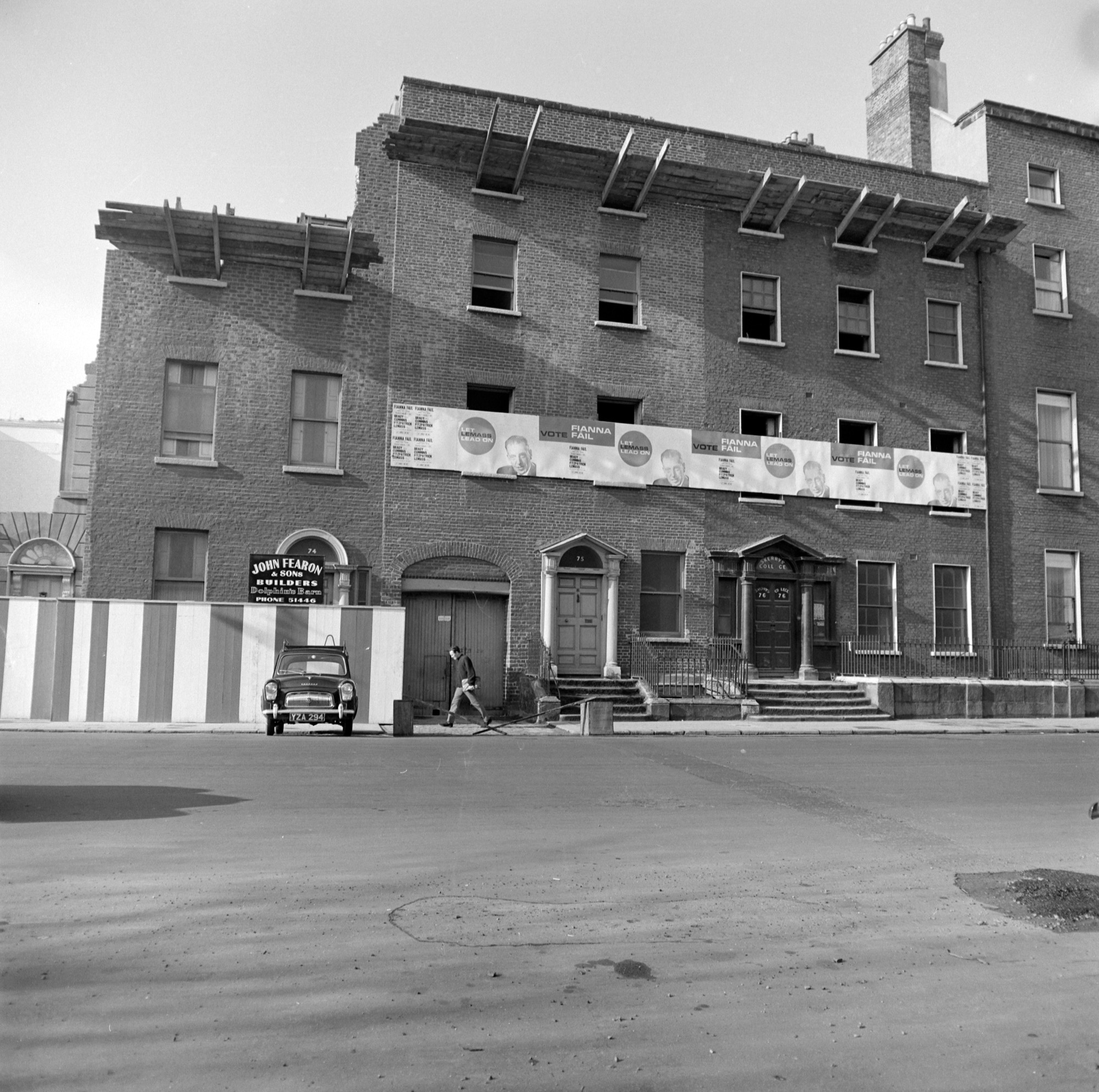
73–76 St Stephen's Green undergoing demolition in April 1965

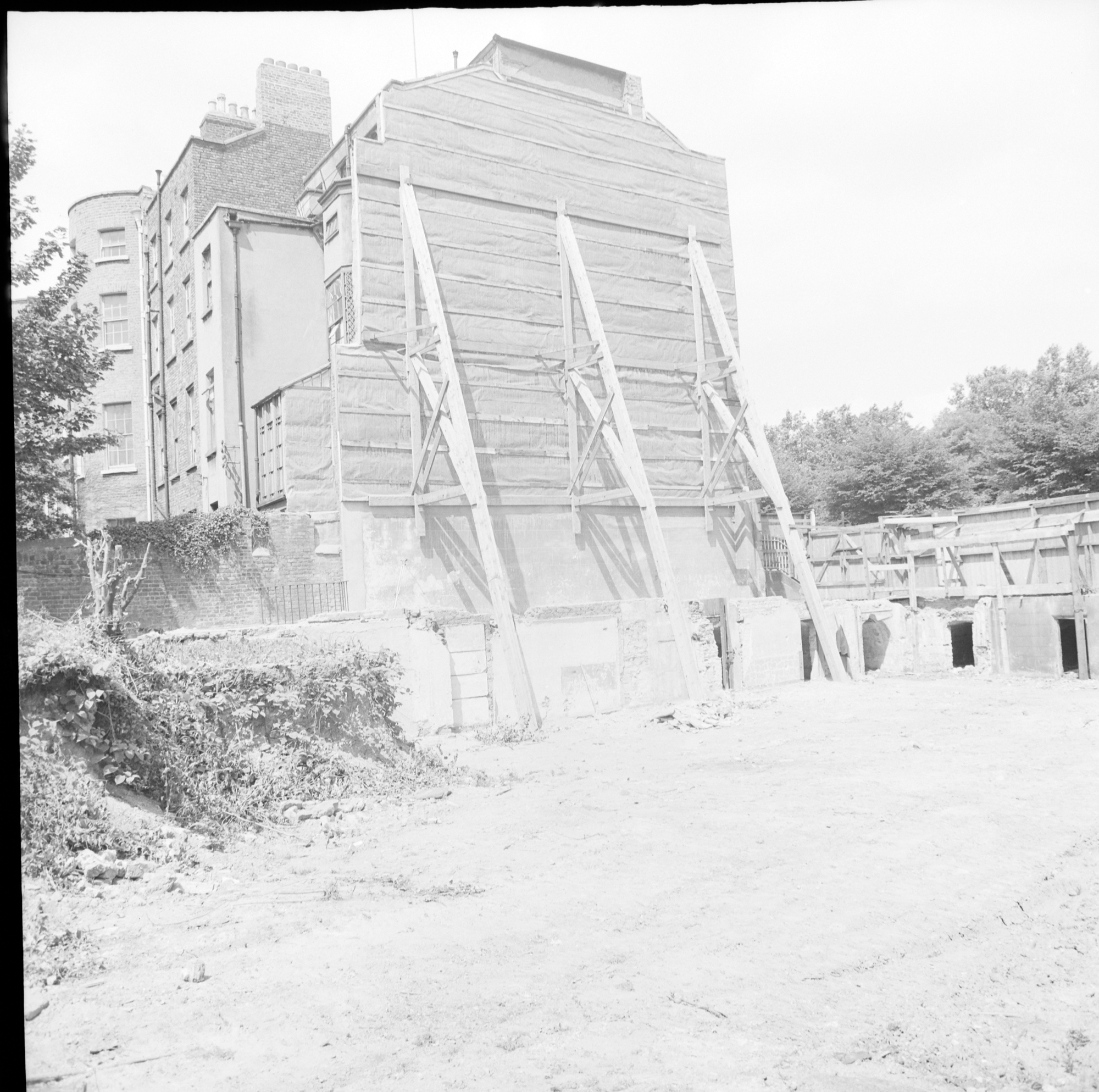
70–77 St Stephen's Green, Dublin in 1964 undergoing demolition

Some of the earliest houses still survive on the south and north sides of the Green. These are identifiable by their lower height and narrow fronts, illustrating how plots were subdivided. Later buildings on the east side show a dramatic change in scale, with much larger and grander houses, many by Gustavus Hume.

Iveagh House on the south side was created from the joining of two earlier houses (numbers 80 and 81) by Benjamin Guinness in the 1860s. It was donated to the Irish State by the Guinness family in 1939, and now houses the main offices of the Department of Foreign Affairs and Trade.

Also on the south side of St Stephen's Green are Newman House (numbers 85 and 86, after John Henry Newman) and University Church. These are home to the Catholic University of Ireland, which was founded in the 19th century. It is linked with University College Dublin, but is no longer active educationally in its own right.

The Unitarian Church, Dublin, built in the Gothic Revival style, is located on the West side of St Stephen's Green.

Also on the west side is the Royal College of Surgeons in Ireland (number 123), home to the oldest of the Republic of Ireland's six medical schools.

On the west side, at the top of Grafton Street, is the Stephen's Green Shopping Centre, built in October 1988. It was, at the time, Ireland's largest shopping centre. Its style was intended to represent a conservatory on the side facing the Green and to mirror the brickwork design of the opposing Gaiety Theatre on South King Street.

On the north side of St Stephen's Green, there were four houses which are now two clubs (originally gentlemen's clubs): the Hibernian United Services Club (number 8, closed in 2002), the Stephen's Green Hibernian Club (number 9, originally the Stephen's Green Club, prior to its merger with the Hibernian United Services Club), the "Friendly Brothers of St Patrick" (number 22, now closed) and the Kildare Street and University Club (number 17). This side of the Green also has the historic Shelbourne Hotel, Dublin's only surviving Victorian hotel. The Little Museum of Dublin, which is housed in a restored Georgian townhouse can be found in number 15.

Also on the north side, Heritage House at 23 St Stephen's Green, was the location of a tearoom which hosted the first public Alcoholics Anonymous meeting in Ireland, on 25 November 1946.

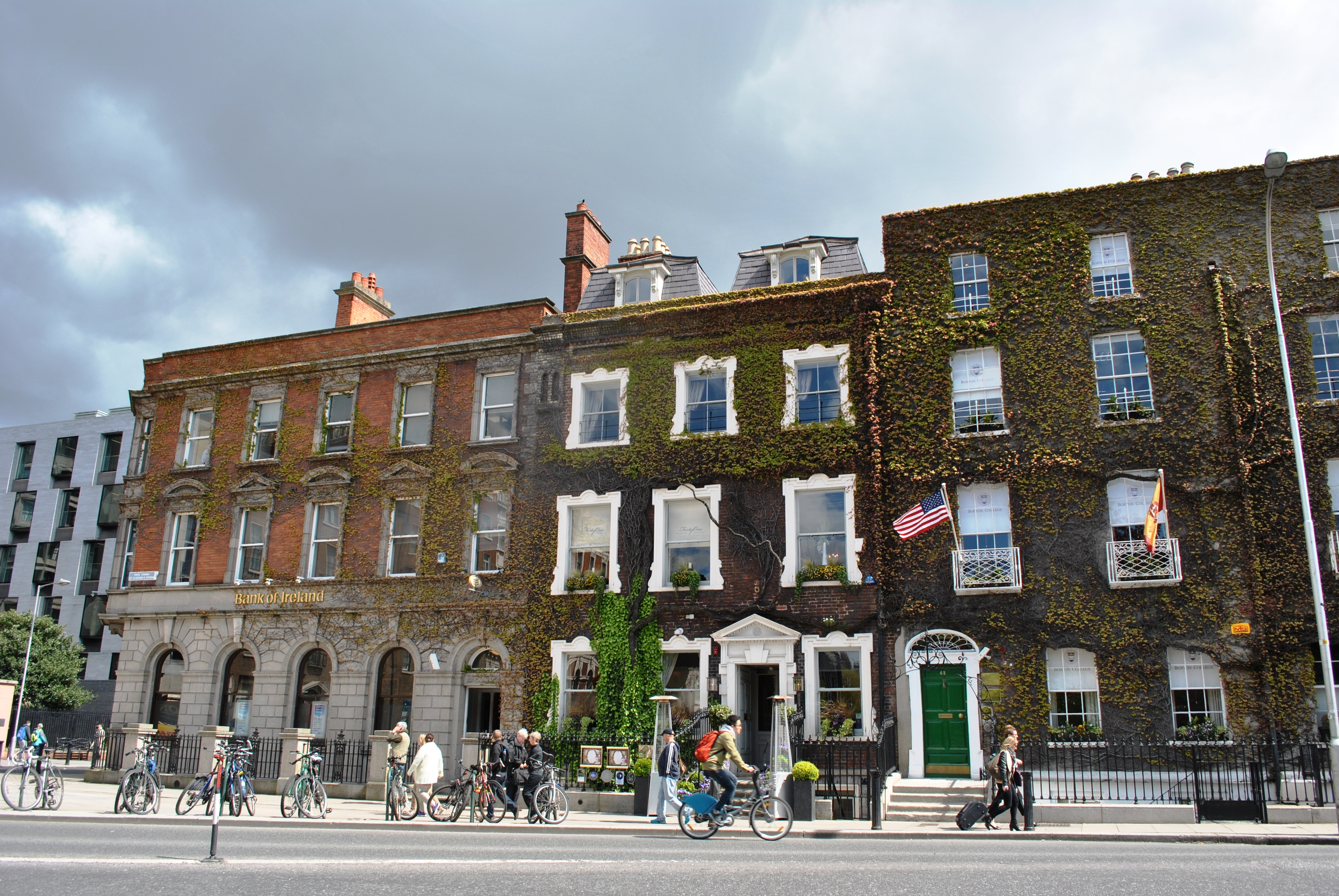
Buildings on the east side

Loreto College, St Stephen's Green, one of Ireland's best-known fee-paying schools for girls, is located at number 53, on the East side of the Green.

St Vincent's Hospital, now located in a suburb on the south side of Dublin, was formerly located in buildings on the East side of St Stephen's Green and on Leeson Street. It is now the headquarters of bank PTSB.

During the mid 20th century, a number of the Georgian buildings on the Green were demolished in favour of modern office blocks. Most of the east side of the square is modern reproduction terraces in front of offices. Among the buildings that were lost was No. 21, the former St Andrew's College, which was demolished by Irish Life in February 1969 and a new office block, Stephen Court, designed by Andrew Devane was constructed in its place. This building is deemed one of the more successful modern interventions on the Green.

== Transport ==
Dublin Bus routes 7b, 7d, 11, 11b, 23, 24, 37, 82, E1, E2, F1, F2, F3, X1 and X2 all have stops along the east side of the square. Routes 44, 44D, X31, and X32 stop on neighbouring Earlsfort Terrace; routes 38/A/B/D, 39/A/X, 70, 116, 118, X25, X26, X27, X28, X30 stop on Leeson Street (as well as the northbound stops for routes stopping on St. Stephen's Green East). Routes 38/A/B/D, 39/A, and 70 also have their southbound stops on Merrion Row.

The Dublin tramways once had several routes serving St. Stephen's Green, including routes 10, 11, 12, 16, 17 and 20, but these were shut down over the 1930s and 1940s. In the 2000s, trams returned to Dublin and the Green line of the Luas tram system stops at the St Stephen's Green stop on the western side of the park, with Luas Cross City services continuing to Broombridge station in Cabra.

A DublinBikes docking point is also located on St. Stephen's Green East.

== See also ==
- List of streets and squares in Dublin
