= Mary Sheldreck =

Irish revolutionary

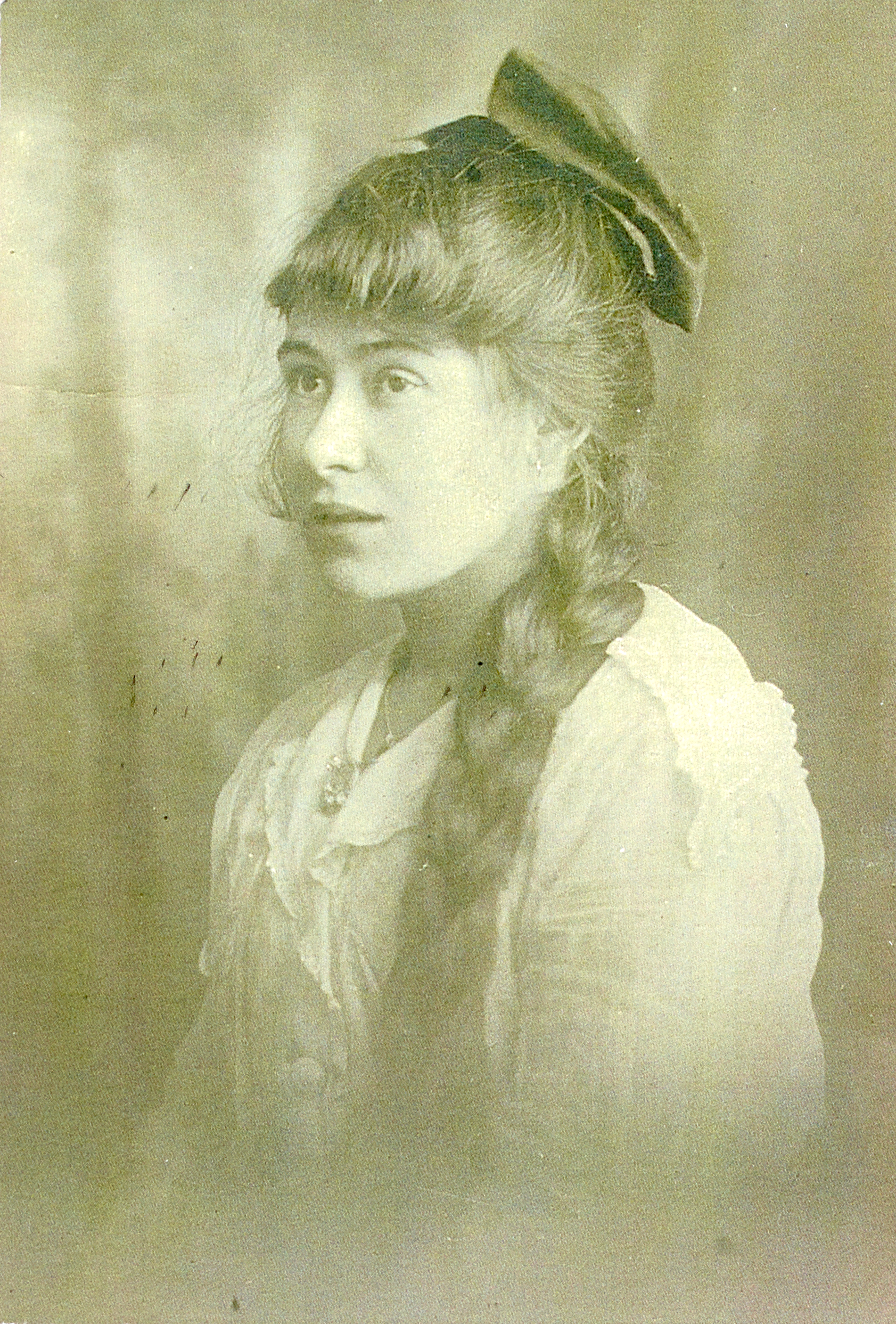
- Mary Sheldreck c. 1912
- Born: c. 1890s
- Died: April 1916; Dublin, Ireland
- Father: Thomas Sheldreck
- Military Service
- Allegiance: Irish Republic
- Branch: Cumann na mBan
- Battles: Easter Rising (1916)
- Awards: Service Medal (1917-1921) (posthumously)

Mary Sheldreck was an Irish revolutionary and member of Cumann na mBan who participated in the 1916 Easter Rising against British rule in Ireland. She was with Constance Markievicz in St. Stephen's Green during the rising, and died from injuries sustained during the fighting. She was posthumously awarded a Service Medal (1917-1921) issued by the President of Ireland for those who had served in the military prior to 1921, which was given to her father Thomas Sheldreck.
