= Michael Mallin =

Irish rebel and socialist (1874–1916)

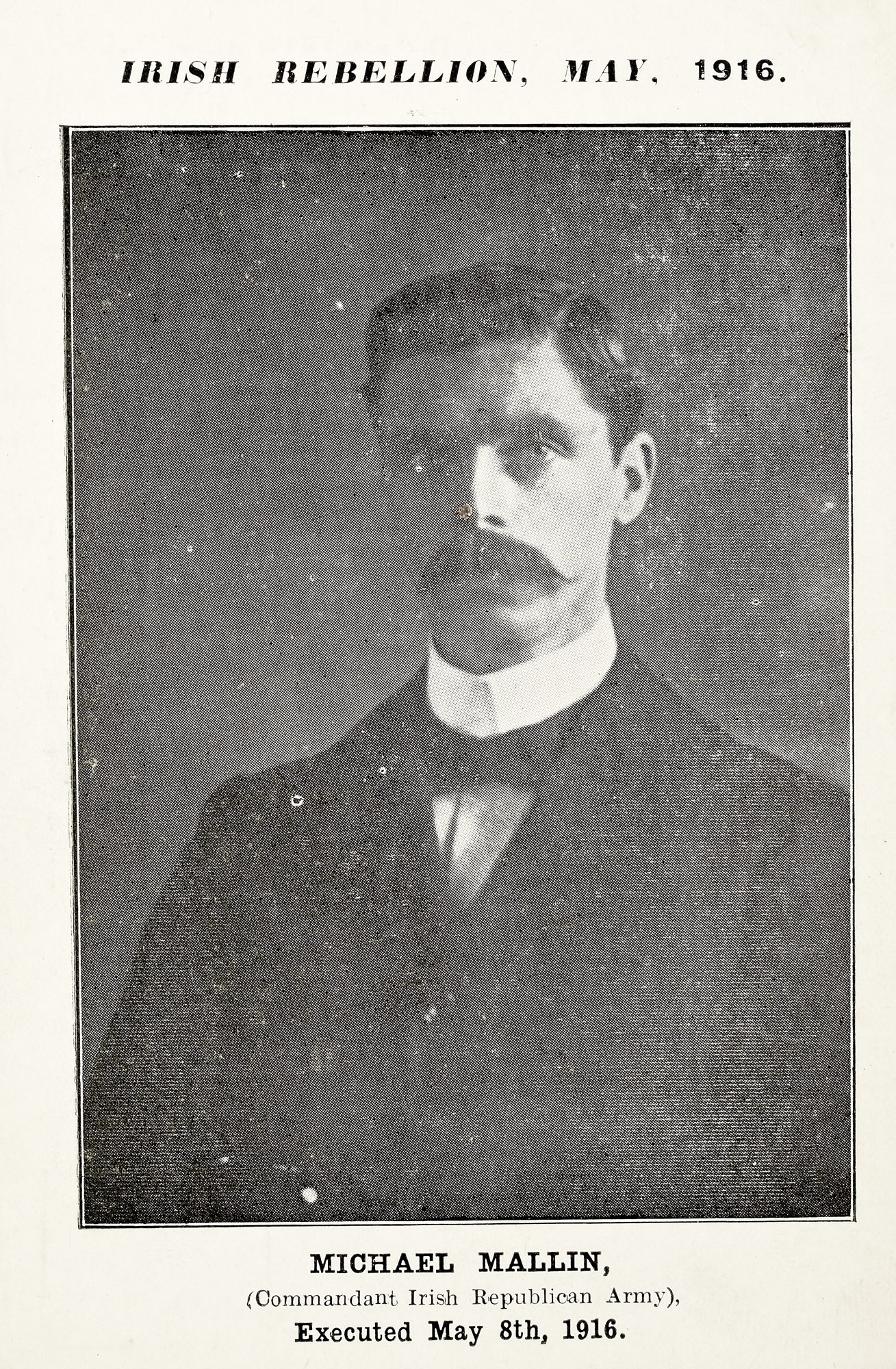
- Born: 1 December 1874; Ward's Hill, The Liberties, Dublin, Ireland
- Died: 8 May 1916 (aged 41); Kilmainham Gaol, Dublin, Ireland
- Cause of death: Execution by firing squad
- Military career
- Allegiance: United Kingdom; Irish Republic
- Branch: British Army; Irish Citizen Army
- Service years: 1889–1903 (British Army); 1913–1916 (Irish Citizen Army)
- Rank: Drummer (British Army); Commandant (Irish Citizen Army)
- Commands: 2i/c Irish Citizen Army; Commander, St Stephen's Green Garrison (1916)
- Conflicts: Tirah Campaign; Easter Rising
- Memorials: Dún Laoghaire railway station

Michael Thomas Christopher Mallin (Irish: Micheál Ó Mealláin; 1 December 1874 – 8 May 1916) was an Irish republican, Socialist and devout Catholic who took an active role in the Easter Rising of 1916. He was a silk weaver, the co-founder with Francis Sheehy-Skeffington of the Socialist Party of Ireland, and was second-in-command of the Irish Citizen Army under James Connolly in the Easter Rising, in which he commanded the garrison at St. Stephen's Green in Dublin.

== Background ==
Mallin was born in Dublin, the eldest of nine children of John Mallin, a carpenter, and his wife Sarah (née Dowling). The family lived in a tenement in the Liberties neighbourhood. He received his early education at the National School at Denmark Street. When he was 15 he visited his uncle James Dowling, who was a member of the British Army as a pay sergeant, and was persuaded to enlist in the army as a drummer. Mallin's mother witnessed the public execution of the Manchester Martyrs. According to his brother Thomas, their father was a "strong nationalist and he and Michael had many a political argument".

== British Army career ==
Mallin enrolled as a soldier with the British Army's 21st Royal Scots Fusiliers on 21 October 1889. During the early years of his service he was stationed in Great Britain and Ireland. His regiment was sent to India in 1896, where he served out the remainder of his almost fourteen-year career, taking part in the Tirah Campaign. It was during his time in India that he became radicalised. In 1897, when asked to donate to the memorial fund for Queen Victoria's jubilee year he refused because 'he could not subscribe as the English monarch had taken an oath to uphold the Protestant faith'. Mallin's brother, Thomas, later suggested that incidents such as this kept him from being promoted any higher than a drummer. He was awarded the India Medal of 1895 with the Punjab Frontier and Tirah clasps 1897–98.

== Post army life ==
On Mallin's return to Ireland, he became a silk weaver's apprentice under his uncle James, who was also a former soldier in the British Army.

He became active in politics, and was the secretary of the Socialist Party of Ireland. He progressed to become a leading official in the silk weavers' union. During the 1913 Lockout, he led a strike of silk workers at the Hanbury Lane factory. The strike lasted for thirteen weeks, with Mallin an effective negotiator on behalf of the strikers. He was appointed second-in-command and chief training officer of the Irish Citizen Army (ICA), which was formed to protect workers from the Dublin Metropolitan Police (DMP) and from employer-funded gangs of strike-breakers. Under the tutelage of Mallin and James Connolly, the ICA became an effective military force. He was also appointed chief of staff of the ICA in October 1914.

== Easter Rising ==
When Connolly was inducted into the Irish Republican Brotherhood (IRB) in January 1916, Mallin began preparing ICA members for the imminent armed revolution. In the week before the operation he communicated orders to the ICA members throughout the city. On Easter Monday, Mallin departed from Liberty Hall at 11:30 am to take up a position at St Stephen's Green with a small force of ICA men and women. Upon arriving at the park they ordered civilians out of it, dug trenches, erected kitchen and first aid stations, and built barricades in the surrounding streets. Constance Markievicz arrived and was originally thought to have been appointed Mallin's second-in-command, but later evidence pointed to this role belonging to Captain Christopher Poole, with Markievicz being third-in-command.

Mallin planned to occupy the Shelbourne Hotel, located on the north-east side of the park, but insufficient manpower prevented him from doing so. This would prove disastrous for the revolutionaries as the British Army during the subsequent fighting was able to occupy the upper floors of the hotel on Monday night. Early Tuesday morning the British Army forces in the Shelbourne began firing down on the encamped rebels. Under intense fire, Mallin ordered his troops to retreat to the Royal College of Surgeons on the west side of the park. The garrison remained in the barricaded building for the remainder of the week. By Thursday it was cut off from the rebel headquarters at the General Post Office (GPO), and running out of food and ammunition.

As the evacuation of Stephen's Green was ongoing Mallin had a close call. Margaret Skinnider records in her autobiography that "I had ridden ahead to report to Commandant Mallin, and while he stood listening to me, a bullet whizzed through his hat. He took it off, looked at it without comment, and put it on again".

On Sunday 30 April 1916, just one week after the commencement of the Easter Rising and the declaration of the Irish Republic, Commandant Michael Mallin, Chief of Staff of the Irish Citizen Army was ordered to surrender his garrison at the College of Surgeons, St. Stephen's Green. The order to surrender was signed by James Connolly and P.H Pearse, delivered to Mallin by Nurse Elizabeth O'Farrell.

After an intense week of fighting, exhausted and hungry Mallin wrote a note to his wife Agnes. The note was written on the inside of a used envelope that has been torn open at the sides. It read – "My darling wife all is lost. My love to all my children, no matter what my fate I am satisfied I have done my duty to my beloved Ireland, and you, and to my darling children. I charge you as their sole guardian now to bring them up in the national faith of your father, and of my faith, of our unborn child [may] God and his blessed Mother help you and it. I said all was lost, I meant all but honour and courage. God and his blessed Mother again guard and keep you my own darling wife".

Mallin obeyed the order and surrendered his position to Captain H.E. De Courcy-Wheeler, Staff Captain to General Lowe, acting Commander of British troops in Ireland. Mallin and the men and women under his command were arrested and taken prisoner. They were escorted first to Ship Street Barracks at Dublin Castle then on to Richmond Barracks, at Inchicore where Mallin was separated for court-martial. Mallin was court-martialled on 5 May.

The summary trial by field general court-martial, an all-military court, was held in-camera. There was no jury in the court, and no independent observers or members of the public were permitted to attend. The trial was hardly impartial, and there was certainly a significant conflict of interest in the selection of the president of the court. The trial lasted less than 15 minutes. The court president was Brigadier Ernest Maconchy and the other members of the court-martial were, Lieutenant Colonel A.M. Bent, and Major F.W Woodward. The prosecuting officer was Ernest Longworth, a commissioned officer in the Training Corps at Trinity College, and a member of the Irish Bar. Mallin had no legal representation during the proceedings. The principal witness for the prosecution was Captain De Courcy-Wheeler. His eye-witness account of the surrender is presented in his evidence to the court-martial, and his first-hand account of the surrender and court-martial was presented in his memoir. He stated to the court-martial that "the prisoner [Mallin] came forward…. saluted and said he wished to surrender ….and stated he was the Commandant of the garrison". Mallin didn't challenge Captain De Courcy-Wheeler's statements. According to Wheeler, when Mallin was asked if he wished to question him, Mallin replied...No.

Furthermore, according to Capt. De Courcy-Wheeler, when Mallin was given leave to speak he used the opportunity to thank Capt. Wheeler for his courtesy during the surrender... "[Mallin] I wish it placed on record how grateful my comrades and myself are for the kindness and consideration which Captain Wheeler has shown to us during this time". The court president acknowledged the request and agreed that Mallin's expression of gratitude would be recorded in the court record. However, despite the promise made by the court president, Brigadier Maconchy, none of this was recorded in the court-martial record. Mallin knew he was a condemned man, and that nothing he could say to the court martial would alter that fact. It is a fallacy to suggest that Commandant Mallin denied his command and responsibility for his garrison. The words in this court-martial record are the uncorroborated hand-written words of one man, the president of the court-martial and his words by his own admission "they are, in many cases, my own words". Captain De Courcy-Wheeler's first-hand account of the court-martial identifies and confirms these significant and important omissions from the court-martial record.

The motives behind what would seem to be deliberate omissions from the trial record, and the statements ascribed to Mallin, would indicate that there were some old scores to settle with Mallin; not least from Mallin's former career in the British Army; and this was an opportunity to settle that score. This court-martial record in itself was a double edged sword designed to discredit Mallin and at the same time indict Countess Markievicz by providing evidence that would confirm her execution.

General Maxwell, newly appointed Commander-in-Chief of British Army in Ireland, had already expressed his own motives for wanting to execute Markievicz. He considered her "bloody guilty and dangerous …a woman who forfeited the privileges of her sex …we can't allow our soldiers to be shot down by such like….Lord French agreed with Maxwell…personally I agree with you she ought to be shot". Maxwell needed a weight of evidence against Markievicz if he was to convince Prime Minister Asquith to accept his decision to confirm her death sentence. The court-martial of Mallin presented Maxwell with the opportunity to place Markievicz in a commanding role and thereby strengthen his hand to execute her as a "ringleader of the rebellion" those guilty of cold blooded murder...a phrase frequently repeated by the Prime Minister Asquith and General Maxwell. However, Asquith insisted that no woman should be executed. Consequently, the sentence of death on Countess Markievicz was commuted to penal servitude for life by a reluctant Maxwell.

== Execution and commemoration ==
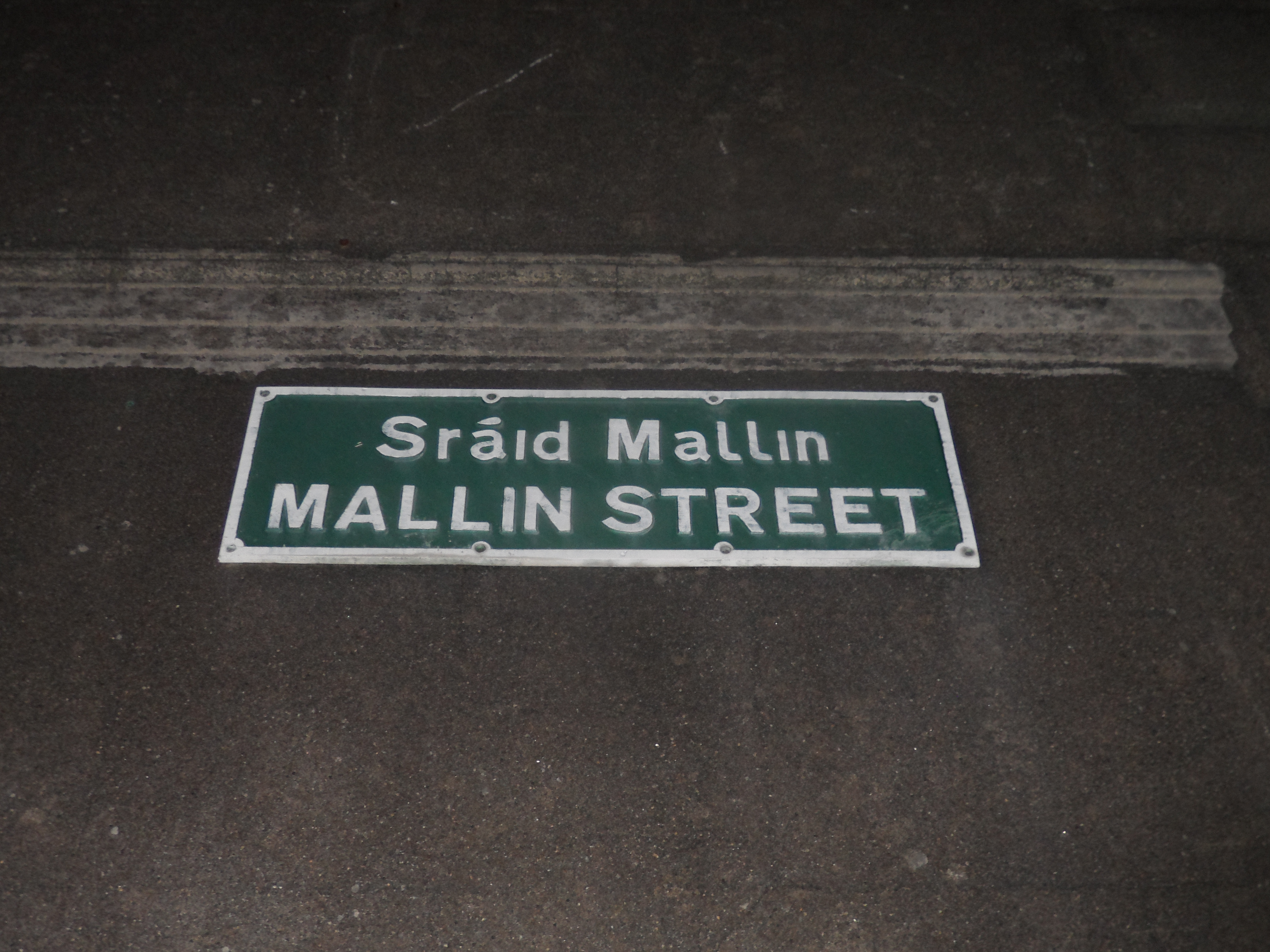
Street named for Michael Mallin, Wexford.

Mallin was executed by firing squad on 8 May 1916. The presiding officer at his court martial was Colonel EWSK Maconchy. The night before his execution he was visited in his cell by his mother, three of his siblings, his pregnant wife and their four children. In his last letter to his wife, who was pregnant with their fifth child, Mallin stated that "I find no fault with the soldiers or the police" and asked her "to pray for all the souls who fell in this fight, Irish and English." He commented "so must Irishmen pay for trying to make Ireland a free nation." He wrote to his children 'Una my little one be a Nun, Joseph my little man be a Priest if you can, James & John to you the care of your mother make yourselves good strong men for her sake and remember Ireland' Both Una and Joseph followed his wishes. His funeral mass took place at the Dominican Church in Tallaght on 13 May 1916. People from the procession clashed with police outside the church with two policemen injured.

== Family ==
Mallin married Agnes Hickey (born in 1870), whom he had met during his early home service in the Army, in 1903. They had three sons and two daughters, the youngest born 4 months after Mallin's execution.

His youngest son, Fr. Joseph Mallin SJ, born on 13 September 1913, was a Jesuit priest and teacher in Hong Kong. Despite having no memory of the visit to his father when he was 3 years old, he fulfilled one of Michael Mallin's last requests as written in his pre-execution letter to his family by joining the priesthood. He was the last surviving child of those executed in the Rising until his death in Hong Kong on 1 April 2018 at the age of 104.
