= Lesbian erasure =

Act of minimizing lesbian representation

Lesbian erasure is a form of lesbophobia that involves the tendency to ignore, remove, falsify, or reexplain evidence of lesbian women or relationships in history, academia, the news media, and other primary sources. Lesbian erasure also refers to instances wherein lesbian issues, activism, and identity is deemphasized or ignored within feminist groups, or the LGBTQ community.

== In history ==
As with gay men, many historical lesbians or suspected lesbians have often been straightwashed, particularly by past historians who considered lesbianism unseemly.

For years, historians overlooked the role of Irish lesbian couples in the Irish revolution, including Kathleen Lynn and Madeleine ffrench-Mullen; Margaret Skinnider and Nora O'Keeffe; and Elizabeth O'Farrell and Julia Grenan. Writing of Irish suffragist Eva Gore-Booth and her lifelong partner Esther Roper, historian Gifford Lewis wrote, "You will be pleased to know that I could find not a trace of perverted sexuality".

Accounts of the 1969 Stonewall riots have been said to paint a "false narrative of white gay men leading the charge" while diminishing the critical involvement by butch lesbians, people of color, drag queens, transgender people. According to eyewitness accounts, the riot was initially sparked by police brutalizing a butch lesbian, sometimes believed to be Stormé DeLarverie.

In 1974, Kathy Kozachenko, a lesbian, was elected to the city council of Ann Arbor, Michigan, making her the first openly gay politician to win an election in the United States. This achievement is sometimes incorrectly ascribed to Harvey Milk, whose 1977 election to the San Francisco Board of Supervisors made him the first gay man to do so. Kozachenko being replaced by Milk in public memory was related to lesbian invisibility in general, as well as Milk's broader, national exposure and assassination carrying weight as well. In addition, unlike Milk's, Kozachenko's sexuality wasn't a central part of her campaign, with Julie Compton describing her as a "fiercely private person".

In 1976, French lesbian feminist Monique Wittig left France for the US, spurred on by fierce resistance she faced from other feminists while trying to create lesbian groups within the Mouvement de libération des femmes. At the time, the word lesbian was deemed an "un-French" American import, and Wittig recalled other MLF members seeking to "paralyse and destroy lesbian groups".

In South Africa, both during and after Apartheid, Black South African lesbians continue to face erasure, discrimination, and violence from other South Africans who consider lesbianism "un-African".

=== Erasure in British criminal law ===
Legal scholar Caroline Derry argues that contrary to the notion that the absence of laws criminalizing same-sex between women in the justice system of England and Wales resulting from "benign neglect", it was "central to a policy of silencing which aimed to keep lesbianism outside the knowledge of, or at least unspeakable by, ‘respectable’ white, British women of higher social class". Similarly, scholar Martha Vicinus argues that rather than lesbians being 'absent' from the Victorian era of social history, there is an "eloquent silence".

During the late 20th century, British legal sanction of same-sex behavior was largely directed at male same-sex activity: Operation Spanner, Paragraph 16 and Clause 25 were the basis for lesbian and gay social protest. Political theorist Anne Marie Smith suggests that in the official legal discourse on homosexuality, lesbian sexuality was represented or treated as a true sexuality.

She attributes this to her observation that lesbians are viewed as "responsible homosexuals" in a dichotomy between that and "dangerous gayness". As a result, lesbian sexual practices were not criminalized in Britain in ways similar to the criminalization of gay male sexual activities.

== In activism ==
Anne Marie Smith points to the exclusion of women from AIDS research at the Centers for Disease Control and Prevention. Smith argues that this erasure result from sexism and suggests that these issues should be addressed directly by lesbian activism.

== In literature ==
Some contemporary historians believe that American poet Emily Dickinson had an intimate relationship with her sister-in-law, Susan Gilbert, leading some academics to assert that she was a lesbian. Dickinson experts Ellen Louise Hart and Martha Nell Smith wrote that Gilbert was a muse to Dickinson, stating that "Emily's correspondence to Susan unequivocally acknowledges that their emotional, spiritual, and physical communion is vital to her creative insight and sensibilities." However, the Emily Dickinson Museum is ambiguous when discussing Dickinson's sexuality.

== In music ==
Author and women's history scholar Bonnie J. Morris wrote that many lesbian singers and musicians are erased from music and its history. As an example, she notes that her college students are unaware of the thriving lesbian music scene that existed several decades ago.

== In television & media ==
=== United States ===
After the introduction of the Hays Code in the U.S. in 1930, most references to homosexuality in American films were censored. Censors removed lesbian scenes from films, and originally-lesbian works were adapted into heterosexual or nonsexual ones. Lesbian films from abroad were not permitted to be shown in the U.S. The Hays Code was relaxed beginning in the 1960s.

Lesbian characters in 1990's American television were often depicted as side characters with little to no definitive information on whether they were lesbians or not. If an episode portrayed two women kissing or some form of homoromantic interactions between female characters, there would be a parental advisory for that specific episode. This was seen with the series Roseanne, where some advertising companies requested that their commercials be excluded from the "Don't Ask, Don't Tell" episode. There was also the issue of Ellen DeGeneres coming out on her show Ellen through her character Morgan in "The Puppy Episode", which received considerable pushback and backlash because of heteronormative views and the heterocentric culture of television.

The "dead lesbian syndrome" trope (also called "bury your gays") describes the tendency for lesbian and bisexual women in television to disproportionately die or meet tragic fates. In the 2015–2016 TV season, Vox writers noted that 22 of 242 permanent character deaths were queer women, or about 10%.

=== Russia ===
In Russia, any content containing positive portrayals of lesbianism or promoting "nontraditional" sexual relationships is banned by the government. Books and movies were pulled from shelves, and people who break the law are subject to court cases and fines of up to 5 million rubles.

== In scholarship ==
While the traditional academic canon has recognized the contributions of gay men, those of lesbians have not received the same scrutiny.

Lesbian feminist voices have sometimes been marginalised within academic discourse. In “The Queer Disappearance of Lesbians: Sexuality in the Academy” (1994), Sheila Jeffreys argued that distinct lesbian perspectives and lesbian-feminist theory were being sidelined within emerging queer theory academic studies.

== Within the LGBTQ community ==
=== Alternative identity labels ===
Some lesbian feminists reject the use of the umbrella term queer, which they perceive as rendering lesbians less visible within the broader LGBTQ community. In her book The Disappearing L, lesbian scholar Bonnie J. Morris despairs that dyke has been replaced by queer among younger LGBTQ activists, a term she says represents a "disidentification" from womanhood and lesbianism. Writers have called lesbian a dirtier word than queer or gay, pointing to negative stereotypes of lesbians as well as the term's association with lesbian porn aimed at heterosexual men. Other writers argue that decreasing use of the term "lesbian" is due to an increase in trans identification and desire for gender-neutral, inclusive terms. However, recent data suggests that lesbian identity, if anything, is increasing in prevalence, leading Claire Thurlow to suggest that these fears are hyperbole.

=== In relation to transgender men ===
Anti-trans feminist groups including the Women's Liberation Front cite stories of young women detransitioning to claim that young people's transition is a social contagion which "erases butch women". In 2017, Ruth Hunt, a butch lesbian and then-CEO of the LGBT charity Stonewall, wrote that transphobic groups present the advancement of trans rights as erasing the identities of younger butch lesbians, but argues that this claim is unsubstantiated. Writing for The Economist, trans author Charlie Kiss argued that the stereotype of trans men being "lesbians in denial" is "demeaning and wrong"; he said he "could not have tried harder or longer to be a "true lesbian" but that it never felt right. (Note: The idea that most or all transgender men are solely attracted to women is considered outdated and a stereotype. A 2023 USA-based study found that, while 28.3% of trans men identified as straight, a further 23.9% identified as bisexual/pansexual, 15.8% identified as gay, 15% identified as queer, and the remaining 17% identified as other sexualities.) According to Claire Thurlow, these gender critical arguments are not supported by empirical data and the concern that butch lesbians will be lost to trans identity is hyperbolic.

=== In relation to transgender women ===
There is discord between those who do and do not believe that trans women can be lesbians without erasing what it means to be a lesbian. Gina Davidson of The Scotsman summed up the conflict by asking if lesbianism is attraction to "female bodies" or to "feminine identity". In an article for Overland, Melbourne historian Liz Crash said trans-exclusionary lesbian advocacy groups use claims of erasure as a "pseudo-progressive cover to anti-trans hate".

Disputes around the inclusion of lesbian-only groups in LGBT events have occurred in various countries. In 2019, UK anti-trans group Get the L Out clashed with several pride festivals, including Pride in London where they forced their way to the front of the parade with signs claiming "transactivism erases lesbians". Organizers apologized for the incident and condemned the group. Also in 2019 New Zealand group "Lesbian Rights Alliance Aotearoa" reported being banned from the Wellington Pride Festival for its views on transgender people. Canadian group "The Lesbians Collective" was asked not to march in the Vancouver Dyke March with signs honoring "lesbian heroes" known for their gender-critical views.

== See also ==
- Bisexual erasure
- Lesbian Avengers
- Lesbophobia
- Queer erasure
- Straightwashing
