= 77 Women commemoration quilt =

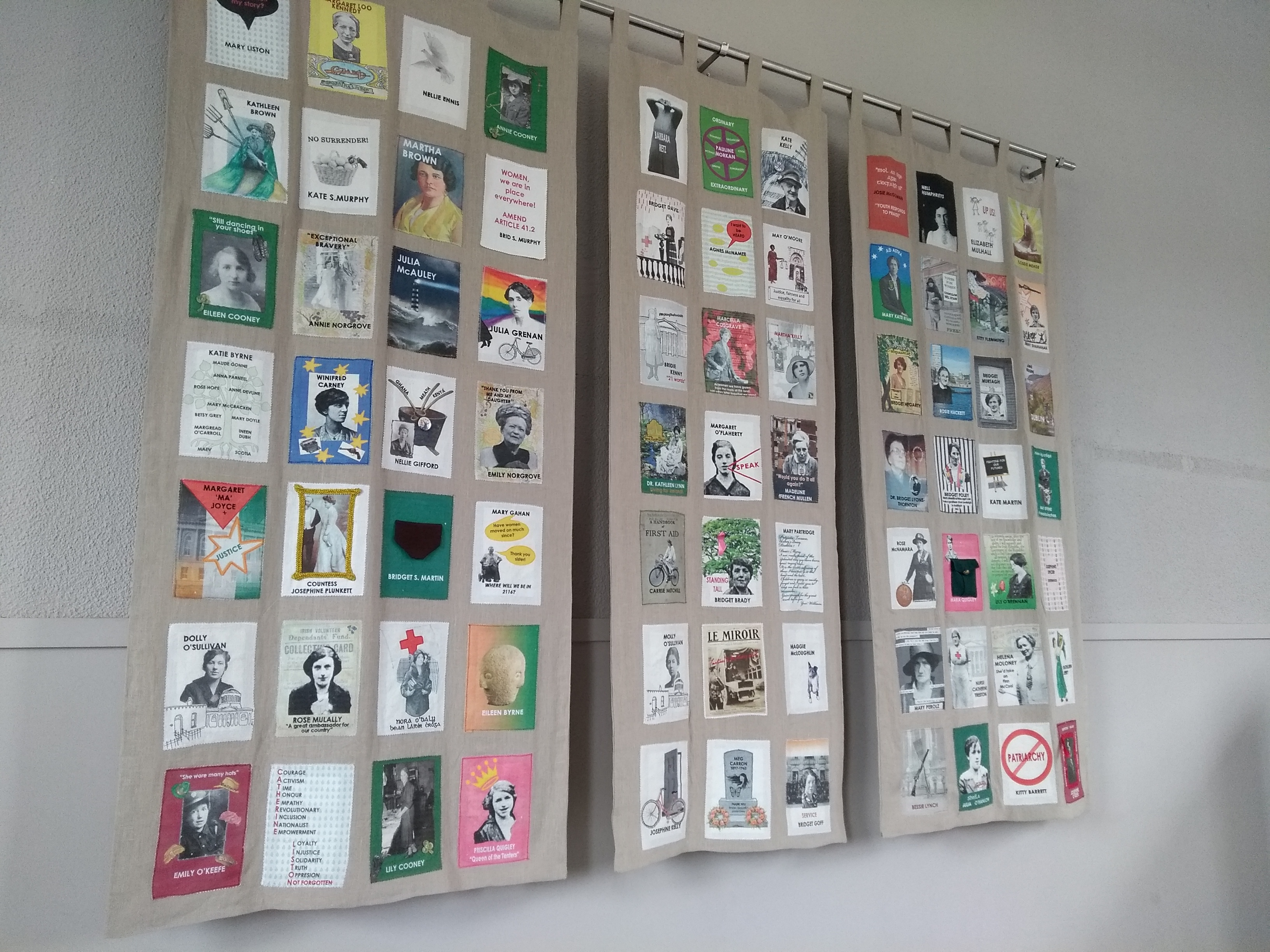
The 77 Women commemoration quilt on display in the Exhibition Centre of Richmond Barracks, Dublin. Taken July 2019.

In the aftermath of the Easter Rising of 1916, 77 women were arrested. They were detained at Richmond Barracks, Dublin before being sentenced, released or transferred to other prisons. The 77 Women quilt was created to commemorate these women during the centenary of the Rising.

The quilt was designed by The Yarn School, a textile studio in Dublin, who worked with women from the local community to create the panels for the quilt. Each panel represents one of the 77 women detained in the Barracks. The quilt was designed for a commemoration event at Richmond Barracks on 8 March 2016. It then formed part of a travelling exhibition to mark the centenary of 1916, before going on display in the Barracks' Exhibition Centre.

== The 77 women ==
During the Rising, around 300 women from the Irish Citizen Army and Cumann na mBan played active roles. Women were involved at all major strongholds throughout Dublin except two, Boland's Mill held by Éamon de Valera and the South Dublin Union held by Éamonn Ceannt.

Some of the women played leading roles in the Rising. Min Ryan carried the order countermanding the manoeuvres that would signal the start of the Rising. Rose McNamara was a Vice Commandant at Marrowbone Lane with 22 women in her command. Constance Markievicz was second in command to Michael Mallin at the College of Surgeons on St. Stephen's Green. Winifred Carney entered the GPO on O’Connell Street, armed with a Webley revolver and a typewriter, and served as James Connolly's secretary for the entirety of Easter Week. Dr Kathleen Lynn was Chief Medical Officer. Nora O'Daly, Madeleine ffrench-Mullen and Rosie Hackett undertook first aid at the Royal College of Surgeons. Elizabeth O'Farrell delivered Padraig Pearse's surrender to the British forces and was at his side when he surrendered.

Many women took on the role of dispatch couriers, carrying messages and arms from the GPO to other outposts. Some served as nurses and provided first aid for the wounded. Before the surrender at the GPO, Pearse called the Cumann na mBan women together to praise their "bravery, heroism and devotion in the face of danger".

In all 77 women were arrested after the Rising and taken to Richmond Barracks. A full list of the women detained there, the organisations they belonged to and the dates they were released was available on the Richmond Barracks website, now.

== Centenary commemorations ==
In 2012, the Irish government established a Decade of Centenaries to commemorate the significant events in Irish history between 1913 and 1923. Part of its remit was to ensure that women's roles in those events formed part of the commemorations. Significant research was undertaken into the roles of women in revolutionary Ireland in advance of the centenaries.

The 77 Women project was part of Richmond Barracks' centenary activities. Mary McAuliffe and Liz Gillis were the project's historians and produced a book called Richmond Barracks 1916 "We were there": 77 Women of the Easter Rising.

== Commemoration quilt ==
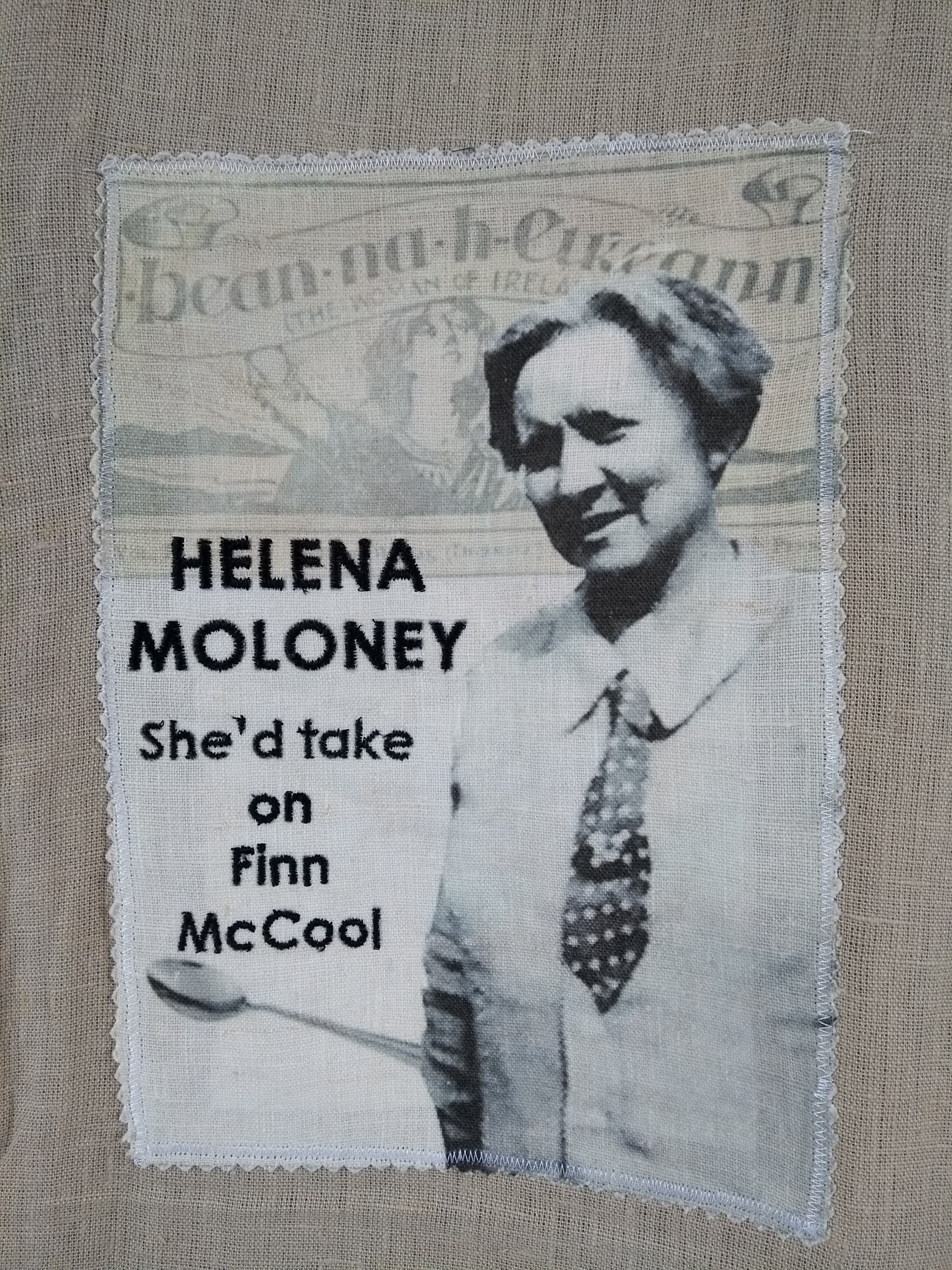
Panel from the 77 women commemoration quilt featuring Helena Moloney. Taken July 2019.

The Quilt is approximately 3m x 2.5m and comprises 77 printed and embroidered linen panels. The Quilt was unveiled as part of a commemoration ceremony for the women of 1916 in Richmond Barracks on 8 March 2016. The Quilt was then part of a touring exhibition around Ireland before hanging in the Exhibition Centre at Richmond Barracks as part of an ongoing exhibition of the women of 1916 and their continuing legacy.

It was created by The Yarn School project working with a group of 77 women in the local community who were invited to creatively respond to the stories of the 77 women detained in Richmond Barracks. The women were selected to reflect the diversity of women's experience in contemporary Ireland. Participants re-visited the motivation of the women who took part in the Rising and at the same time to reflected on their own vision for Ireland, 100 years from now. The quilt represents the two layers of stories.

According to the Exhibition Centre in Richmond Barracks, the quilt was intended "not only to commemorate these women’s involvement in the Rising, but also remember their life-long commitments to equality for women, nationalism and social justice. Their struggles have left an often unrecognised legacy that has been kept alive through the activism of thousands of women across Ireland over the past 100 years. The 77 Women Commemoration Quilt project is designed to create a conversation between the women of 1916 and women living in Ireland today".

== The Yarn School ==
The Yarn School is a community-based textile studio in Goldenbridge, Dublin founded by Swedish-Irish artist Marja Almqvist in 2012. Its aim is to facilitate personal and community empowerment through creative learning. The name references both the medium of textiles and the tradition of storytelling, as in a ‘good yarn’. Participants explore personal and collective history and meaning through the creative use of textiles.
