= Nora O'Keeffe =

Irish revolutionary and feminist (1885–1961)

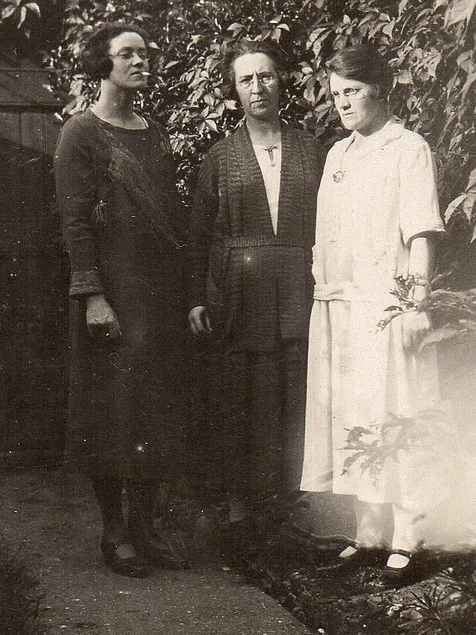
- From left to right: Brigid O'Keeffe, Margaret Skinnider and Nora O'Keeffe in 1925
- Born: 1885; Glenough, County Tipperary
- Died: 1961 (aged 75–76); Clontarf, Dublin
- Other names: Nóra Ní Chaoimh
- Partner: Margaret Skinnider

Nora O’Keeffe (1885–1961) was a revolutionary and feminist from County Tipperary. She was a regional organiser of Cumann na mBan, a dispatch courier in the War of Independence and an anti-Treaty propagandist during the Irish Civil War who was interned in Cork and Kilmainham Gaol. She was the lifelong partner of Margaret Skinnider, a sniper wounded in the 1916 Rising.

== Early life ==
O’Keeffe was born in 1885 in Glenough, near Clonoulty, County Tipperary to Daniel and Ellen (née Ryan) O'Keeffe. She was the sixth of 12 surviving children in a relatively wealthy farming family who were involved in the Gaelic League. Throughout her life, O’Keeffe used the Irish version of her name, Nóra Ní Chaoimh, to sign most of her correspondence.

She and her older brother Patrick emigrated to the United States in 1909, where she worked as a typist and stenographer. It is likely that she met Skinnider in New York, possibly through Clan na Gael, and they returned to Ireland together in 1919. They set up home in Fairview, Dublin, and both joined the local Cumann na mBan branch.

== The War of Independence ==
The War of Independence began in January 1919 at Soloheadbeg, County Tipperary with an incident that involved O’Keeffe's cousin Seán Treacy, aided by women from Cumann na mBan. A wagon loaded with gelignite from a local quarry was attacked and two RIC men were killed, marking the outbreak of the war. O’Keeffe's brothers Dan and Con were in the IRA and her sister Brigid was Captain of the Clonoulty branch of Cumann na mBan. The O’Keeffe family home in Glenough was used as a safe house and leaders of the Third Tipperary Brigade held a ‘council of war’ there.

When O’Keeffe and Skinnider arrived back to Ireland in March 1919, they became involved in the war as members of Cumann na mBan. They stored arms and "kept people on the run" at their home in Fairview. One of these was Treacy, a member of the ‘Big Four’ IRA men who had been involved in assassination attempts on the Irish Viceroy. O’Keeffe later identified his body after he was killed on 14 October 1920.

O’Keeffe's skills as a typist and stenographer were used in her role as a dispatch courier. She travelled between Dublin, Tipperary, and other parts of Munster on Cumann na mBan work. The War Office described her as "one of the most notorious despatch riders, IRA in Ireland. This girl is said to carry despatches between Dublin, Cork, Tipperary, and Waterford."

Many members of Cumann na mBan were targeted by the authorities in raids on their homes from mid-1920 until the truce in July 1921. In May 1921, the O’Keeffe family home in Glenough was blown up by the Black and Tans.

== Civil War ==
During the Civil War that followed the partition of Ireland, O’Keeffe took an anti-Treaty stance. She was appointed anti-Treaty publicity agent in Tipperary by Brigid ‘Bridie’ O'Mullane who ran the publicity office for the IRA. As director of publicity for the Third Tipperary Brigade, O'Keeffe co-edited the anti-Treaty newspaper Chun an Lae from 1922 to 1923.

O’Keeffe was arrested by Free State forces in February 1923, imprisoned in Cork Jail and later transferred to Kilmainham Gaol. Constance Markievicz drew a satirical cartoon which depicted the Free State's "glorious victory" in capturing the bicycles of Nora and her sister.

Under the Coercion Act, carrying documents relating to the activities of the Free State authorities was an act of treason and carried a sentence of imprisonment. Those arrested were tried by military courts. WT Cosgrave, then President of the Executive of the Free State Government, recognised the role of the Cumann na mBan women in propaganda and communication and arrested hundreds of them, saying that it was "not possible to consider these women as ordinary females".

The Civil War ended in April 1923 but O’Keeffe and some other Cumann na mBan prisoners weren't released until 29 September.

== Post-war ==
After the war, O’Keeffe wrote articles for various national and international newspapers and later joined the Civil Service. She and Skinnider continued their activism as feminists, trade unionists and republicans. They found that the "equality with the men" promised to women in the 1916 Proclamation had not materialised in the 1922 Constitution. The 1925 Civil Service (Amendment) Bill limited the ability of women like O’Keeffe to take the Senior Civil Service exam.

Their anti-Treaty stance in the War meant that O’Keeffe and Skinnider found it difficult to find work under the Irish Free State government and they occasionally had to rely on support from former comrades and friends such as Hanna Sheehy Skeffington. When the military service pension acts were introduced in 1924, members of Cumann na mBan were not eligible.

O’Keeffe and Skinnider continued to be involved in a "much reduced" Cumann na mBan. O’Keeffe was on its Executive from 1925 to the early 1930s. She was a member of an economic sub-committee set up to look into work schemes to help members financially. A list of ‘Women involved with organisations listed as dangerous by the Free State CID in 1930’ included O’Keeffe as a member of Sinn Féin and Skinnider as a member of Cumann na mBan. They campaigned, unsuccessfully, against articles in the 1937 Constitution which positioned women in the home.

O’Keeffe had an interest in history and folklore and published folk stories under her Irish name Nóra Ní Chaoimh.

== Personal life ==
In 1926 the couple moved to Seafield Road, Clontarf where they lived together until O’Keeffe's death in 1961. According to Skinnider's biographer Mary McAuliffe, "Letters, postcards and photographs in the Skinnider family archive show a full and active life" and indicate the couple loved to travel and remained close to their respective families.

While their relationship remained hidden to the public, McAuliffe says "it is clear from archival material, that her friends Sheehy Skeffington and [Nora] Connolly O’Brien among them regarded Margaret and Nora as a couple". They were one of several same-sex revolutionary female couples, including Kathleen Lynn and Madeleine ffrench Mullen, and Elizabeth O’Farrell and Julia Grenan. These women were featured, along with Eva Gore-Booth and others, in a 2023 TG4 documentary about "the radical queer women at the very heart of the Irish Revolution": Croíthe Radacacha (Radical Hearts).

== Death ==
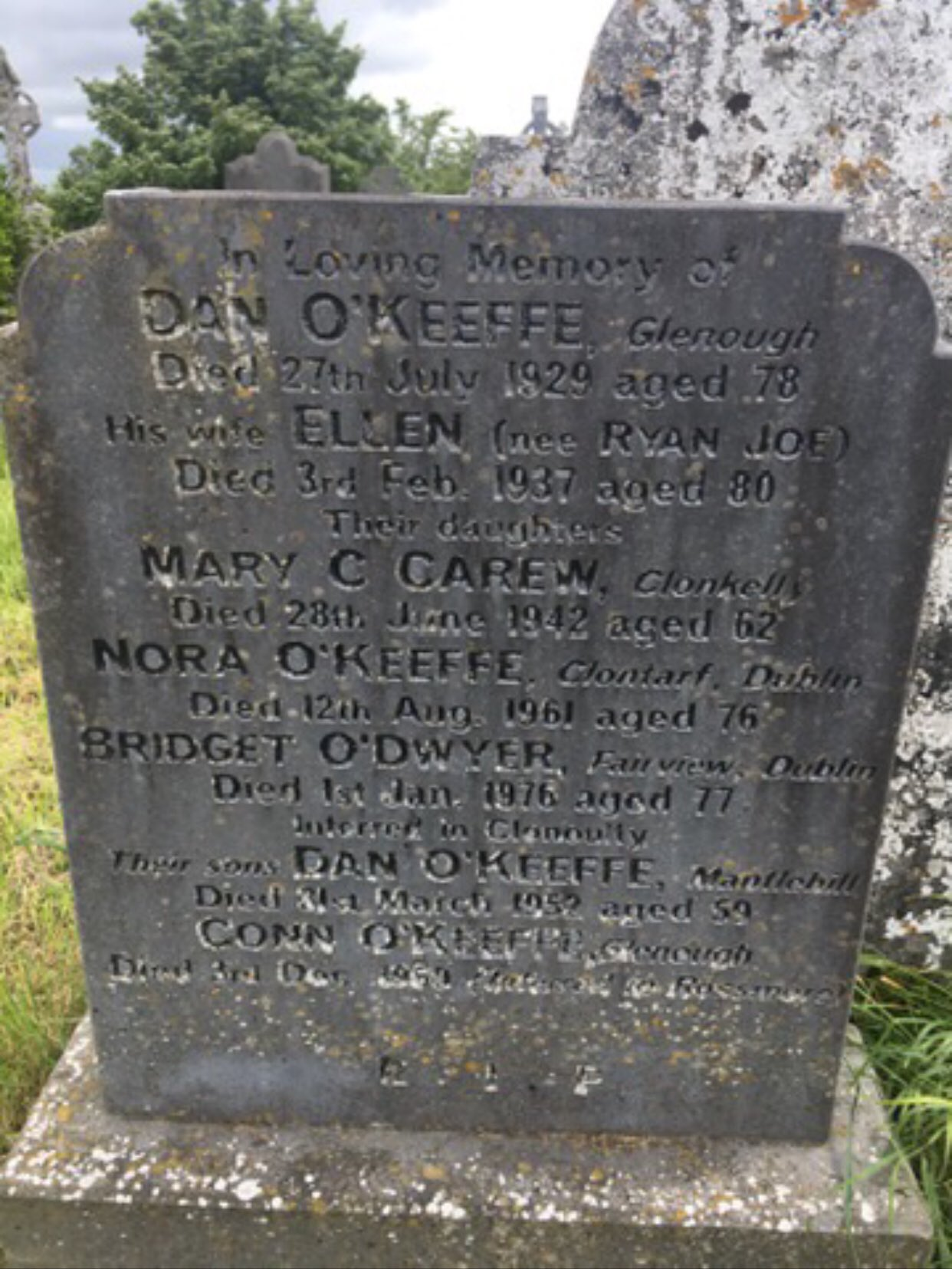
The O'Keeffe family gravestone at Kilpatrick Cemetery. Taken by Robert O'Keeffe.

O’Keeffe died of cardiac failure aged 76 in August 1961. She was buried in Kilpatrick Cemetery, County Tipperary. Her obituary mentioned her involvement with Cumann na mBan and the Third Tipperary Brigade but omitted Skinnider, her partner of more than 40 years.

For the following ten years, Skinnider marked O’Keeffe's anniversary with a memorial in the Irish Independent newspaper. It read: "In loving memory of my dear friend Nora O’Keeffe, late of 134 Seafield Rd., Clontarf, who died 12 Aug. 1961. Sacred Heart of Jesus grant her eternal rest. Mass offered – Margaret."
