= Nora O'Daly =

Irish nationalist, writer and trade unionist

- Born: Nora Margaret Mary Gillies; 12 August 1883; Terenure, Dublin, Ireland, United Kingdom
- Died: 10 May 1943 (aged 59); Jobstown, Dublin, Republic of Ireland
- Organization: Cumann na mBan
- Spouse: Séamus (James) O'Daly (m. 1910)
- Family: Paddy Daly (brother in law)

Nora O'Daly (1883–1943) was an Irish nationalist, writer and trade unionist. As a member of Cumann na mBan, she took part in the Easter Rising of 1916 and was among the 77 women arrested and detained in Richmond Barracks. She later wrote a memoir of her experience in the Rising.

== Early life ==
O'Daly was born Nora Margaret Mary Gillies on 12 August 1883 to John Malcolm and Alice Maud Gillies in Terenure, Dublin. Her father had come to Ireland from Scotland in 1878 to work as general manager of the Freeman's Journal. Her parents were both Presbyterians but O'Daly and six of her seven siblings later converted to Catholicism. She joined the Gaelic League along with her sisters Kathleen and Daisy.

She and her sister Daisy married brothers James (Séamus) and Paddy O'Daly (also known as Daly) in a double wedding in 1910. James O'Daly was an engineer and a fellow nationalist who joined the Irish Volunteers. They had four children.

== Easter Rising ==
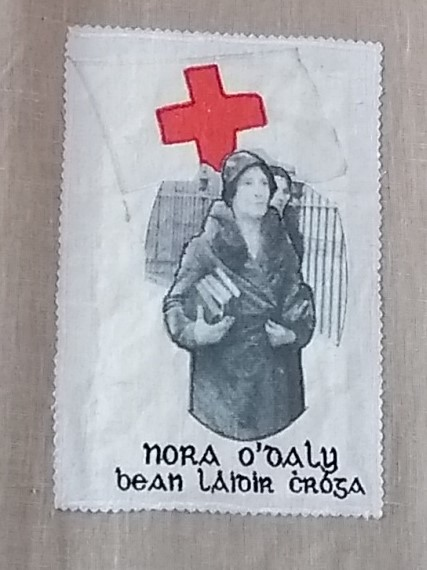
Panel from 77 Women commemoration quilt depicting Nora O'Daly. Taken at the 1916 exhibition in Richmond Barracks, July 2019.

In 1914, O'Daly was a founding member of the Fairview branch of Cumann na mBan, which was attached to the 2nd Battalion of the Irish Volunteers. Here she learned first aid, rifle cleaning and sighting, drill and other skills which "might prove useful in assisting the men of the 2nd Battalion". Her home in Clontarf was used to hide arms and ammunition in preparation for the Rising. O'Daly was also involved in intelligence gathering for a planned attack on the Magazine Fort in the Phoenix Park. She and another Cumann na mBan member, Bridget Murtagh, collected valuable information on the layout of the Fort, the numbers of soldiers and changes of the guard.

On Easter Monday 1916, O'Daly and other members of the Fairview Cumann reported to St Stephen's Green, under the command of Michael Mallin and Countess Markievicz. O'Daly spent the week of the Rising in the Royal College of Surgeons, where she delivered first aid with Madeleine ffrench-Mullen and Rosie Hackett. She attended to Margaret Skinnider, the only women injured in the Rising, who she said "bore her frightful wounds with the greatest fortitude".

After the surrender, O'Daly was detained in Richmond Barracks before being moved to Kilmainham Gaol. Most of the women prisoners were released on 8/9 May, but O'Daly, ffrench-Mullen and Nellie Gifford were held on as they were regarded as dangerous subversives. She later wrote an account of her time in Kilmainham.

After the Rising, O'Daly transferred to the Central Branch of Cumann na mBan and was involved in its reorganisation. She fundraised for the Irish National Aid and Volunteers Dependence Fund. She was involved in anti-conscription activity and campaigned for Sinn Féin in the general election of 1918.

O'Daly is commemorated in the 77 Women commemoration quilt created by The Yarn Project in honour of the women arrested and held in Richmond Barracks after the Rising.

== War of Independence ==
During the War of Independence O'Daly served as a judge in the Republican Courts in the Fairview / Ballybough District. The courts were often raided by the authorities and its members arrested. Despite raids on her home, O'Daly ran a safe house. She sheltered Joe Leonard, who was involved in the assassinations of 14 British agents on 21 November 1920, which became known as Bloody Sunday. Her brother-in-law Paddy O'Daly was also a member of the assassination 'Squad' under Michael Collins. She was described by the Black and Tans as "a dangerous woman".

== Later life ==
O'Daly was not involved in the Irish Civil War. After the foundation of the Irish Free State, she worked as a secretary to the Dáil Courts winding up committee. She joined the Irish Women Workers Union (IWWU) where she worked for the rights of women workers.

She had a lifelong interest in Irish literature and wrote poetry and prose, including her memoir of the Rising. In 1926, she published 'The Women of Easter Week; Cumann na mBan in Stephen's Green and in the College of Surgeons' in An tÓglach, the magazine of the Irish Free State army.

She died aged 59 years on 10 May 1943 at her home 'Clooncoora' in the Jobstown area of southern County Dublin.
