= Charlemont Clinic =

Former private medical facility in Dublin, Ireland

Coordinates: 53°19′51″N 6°15′40″W

Geography
- Location: Dublin, Ireland

History
- Opened: 1989
- Closed: 2014

Links
- Lists: Hospitals in the Republic of Ireland

The Charlemont Clinic was a private medical clinic in Dublin, Ireland.

== History ==
The clinic was established in 1989 on the site of the former Saint Ultan's Children's Hospital.

== Closure and sale ==
Due to decreasing revenue, the 0.38 hectare city centre site was offered for sale in 2014 at €5 million. It was purchased by U+I Group for €7.1 million and later sold to the Dalata Hotel Group for €11.9 million. In 2016, Dalata obtained planning permission for a 181-bedroom 4 star hotel on the site, which opened as the Clayton Hotel Charlemont on 23 November 2018.
