= Julia Grenan =

Irish nationalist, suffragette and socialist (1883–1972)

- Born: Julia Grenan; July 2, 1883; Dublin, Ireland
- Died: January 6, 1972 (aged 88); Dublin, Ireland
- Other name: Sheila Grenan
- Partner: Elizabeth O'Farrell

Julia Grenan (Sighle, Sheila, 2 July 1883 – 6 January 1972) was an Irish nationalist, republican, suffragette and socialist and member of Cumann na mBan, best known for being one of the three last women to leave the Headquarters during the Easter Rising of 1916.

== Background ==
Julia Grenan was born on 2 July 1883 to Patrick Grenan, a joiner of Lombard Street in Dublin near to where Elizabeth O'Farrell grew up. She had two brothers and was the only girl. Her mother was Elizabeth Kenny, daughter of Hugh Kenny, who died in 1900 from chronic bronchitis, amongst other ailments. She went to the Sisters of Mercy school and after that became a dressmaker. Most of her life was spent with O'Farrell, the two girls being childhood friends and growing up together. As women they were strong nationalists, spoke Irish and joined the various organisations in Dublin like the Gaelic League, the Irish Women's Franchise League and the Irish Women Workers' Union. In 1906, they joined Inghinidhe na hÉireann, and went on to become members of the Inghinidhe branch of Cumann na mBan soon after its creation in 1914. During the 1913 Dublin Lock-out they supported the workers. They worked with Constance Markievicz to try to prevent recruitment into the British Armed forces. She trained them both in the use of firearms.

== The Rising ==
Grenan in 1916 while detained

Once the Rising was planned, and the day before it began Markievicz ensured they were central to the action by directing them to Liberty Hall to introduce them to the Irish Citizen Army leader James Connolly and ensuring he knew they were to be trusted.

Grenan was sent to Dundalk and Carrickmacross to deliver dispatches to the republican units there. O'Farrell was sent west. On their return they worked out of the General Post Office as couriers and nurses. They also ensured delivery of ammunition from the GPO to the College of Surgeons garrison, hiding the weapons under their clothes. Along with her friend Elizabeth O'Farrell, and James Connolly's aide de camp, Winifred Carney, she cared for the wounded including Connolly whose ankle was shattered by a bullet on the 27th. The three women refused to leave when the rest of the women were evacuated until the Friday night when they retreated with the leaders to Moore Street. Grenan and O'Farrell nursed the wounded there until the final surrender was decided. O'Farrell was handed a Red Cross insignia and a white flag and asked to deliver the surrender to the British military. Grenan watched her from the door as O'Farrell walked out into heavy fire.

== Aftermath ==
Grenan was arrested with the men from Moore street and initially kept overnight in the gardens at the Rotunda. They were then taken to Richmond Barracks and finally imprisoned with the rest of the women arrested in Kilmainham Gaol until 9 May. While she heard the executions their wardress originally told the prisoners that the shots were from ongoing fighting. Grenan continued her work for Cumann na mBan with her friend O'Farrell. They carried dispatches during the Irish War of Independence. After the Anglo-Irish Treaty was signed in 1921 they remained Anti-Treaty and remained hostile to the Free State.

They collected funds during the Irish Civil War for the families of the anti-Treaty prisoners and continued to attend republican functions. Eventually in 1933 they resigned from the Cumann feeling that the organisation had drifted away from their beliefs. Both women gave their support to the 1956–62 IRA border campaign. Because O'Farrell was the woman who actually delivered the surrender she tends to be the better remembered of the couple. In the years after the Rising and wars Grenan worked for the Irish Hospital Sweepstakes office in Ballsbridge and also as a furrier in Dublin. The two women lived together at 27 Lower Mount Street, Dublin.

Julia Grenan died in Dublin on 6 January 1972 and was buried alongside Elizabeth O'Farrell, who had died in 1957, in the republican plot in Glasnevin cemetery, Dublin. That Elizabeth and Julia were romantic partners is now widely considered to be the case. The significant closeness they displayed, the fact they lived together for 30 years, the fact that neither was ever married to a man and the fact they were buried beside each other are all considered indicators of a more intimate relationship than publicly stated. Similarly, their comrades in the 1916 Rising, Kathleen Lynn and Madeleine ffrench-Mullen, are also considered to be another "unstated" couple, as were Margaret Skinnider and Nora O'Keeffe, all of whom were featured, along with Eva Gore-Booth and others, in a 2023 TG4 documentary about "the radical queer women at the very heart of the Irish Revolution": Croíthe Radacacha (Radical Hearts).
