= Saint Ultan's Children's Hospital =

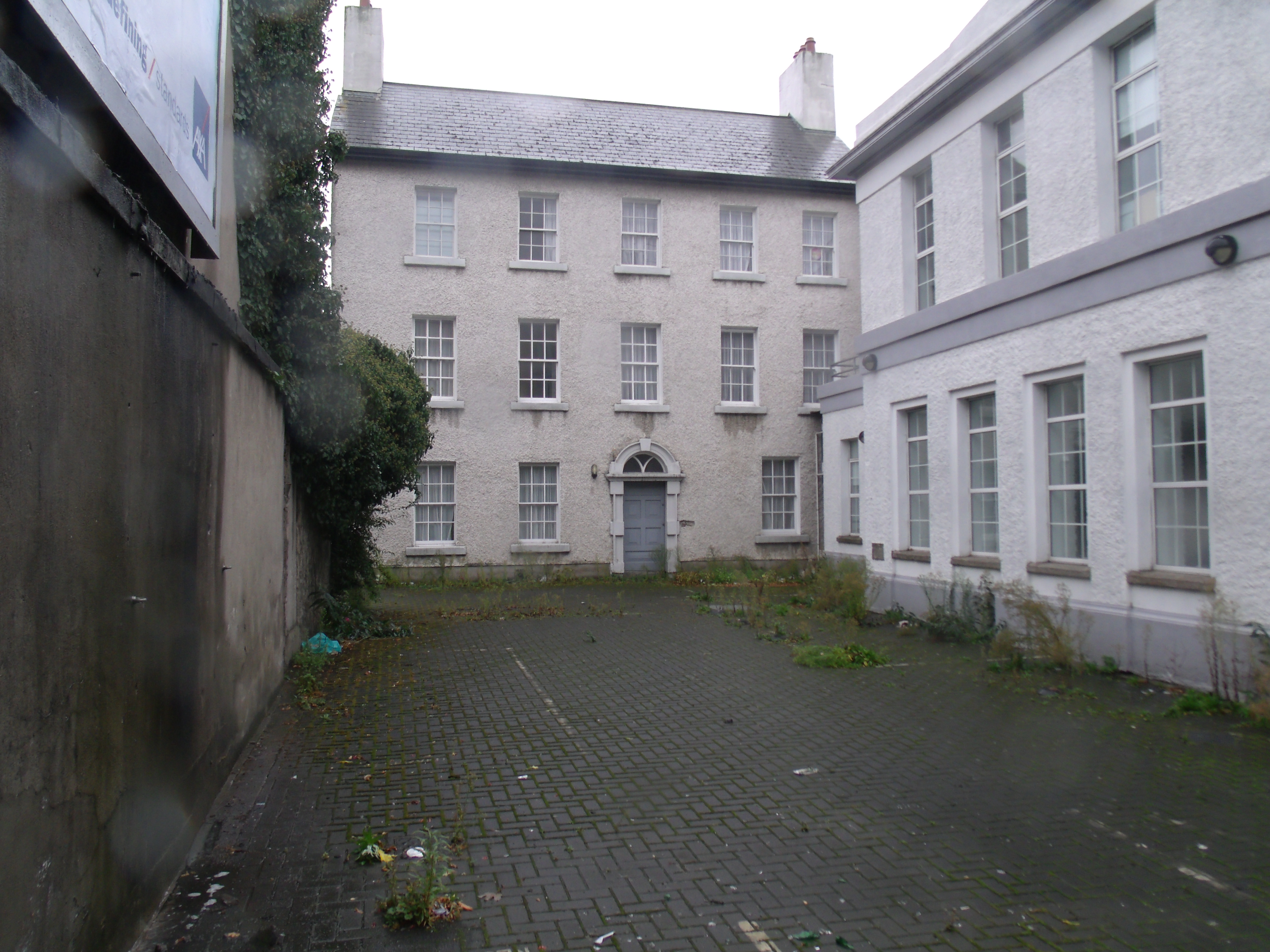
- The hospital in 2015

- Shown in Dublin

Geography
- Location: Charlemont Street, Dublin, Ireland
- Coordinates: 53.330712°N 6.261230°W

Organisation
- Type: Specialist

Services
- Speciality: Paediatrics

History
- Founded: 1919
- Closed: 1984

Saint Ultan's Children's Hospital (Irish: Ospidéal Leanaí Naomh Ultan) was a paediatric hospital in Dublin, Ireland. It was named after Ultan of Ardbraccan, patron saint of paediatricians.

== History ==
The hospital was founded by Dr Kathleen Lynn and Madeleine ffrench-Mullen with the help of Sinn Féin activists in 1919 and was housed in an old Georgian house constructed around the year 1770.

The committee opened the hospital with a fund of just £70 and 2 sleeping cots. The building was in a state of disrepair and was reputed to have once been a shooting hall used by Lord Charlemont. It was the first hospital for infants in Ireland and hospital physicians in the early years included Ella Webb and Dorothy Price. Earlier in her career, Lynn had experienced discrimination in applying for hospital positions due to her gender, and Saint Ultan's was the only hospital in Ireland entirely managed by women. It was the first hospital in Ireland to provide the BCG vaccination and from 1937 became the centre for BCG in Ireland. Dr Barbara Stokes, specialist in children with disabilities, also worked at the hospital.

In 1936, a new hospital was designed for the site by the architectural practice Scott and Good, a partnership between Norman Douglas Good and Michael Scott, but this was never built.

After services transferred to the National Children's Hospital in Harcourt Street, Saint Ultan's Children's Hospital closed in 1984. The site became part of the Charlemont Clinic, a private medical clinic which operated until 2014, when it was sold to the Dalata Hotel Group for redevelopment as the Clayton Hotel Charlemont, which opened in 2018.
