= Barbara Stokes =

Irish paediatrician and disability campaigner

Dr Barbara Stokes
- Born: Barbara Maive Stokes; 20 December 1922; London, England
- Died: 22 March 2009 (aged 86); Dublin, Ireland

Barbara Stokes (20 December 1922 – 22 March 2009) was an Irish paediatrician and disability campaigner.

== Early life and family ==
Barbara Stokes was born in London on 20 December 1922. Her parents were Brigadier William Noel (died 1969) and Pauline Mary Stokes (née Reynolds). William was Irish, and her mother was English. Stokes would holiday in Ireland during the summer, and played in the Irish junior tennis championship as a teenager. She attended St Paul's Girls' School, Brook Green, London. Her uncle Adrian Stokes was a pathologist at University College London and Guy's Hospital, and it was from him that Stokes developed an interest in medicine with the two corresponding while he was in a remote area of west Africa conducting research. When Stoke's father retired from the Royal Army Ordnance Corps, the family returned to Dublin in the summer of 1939 and lived at Grianán, Baily, Howth. Stokes entered Trinity College Dublin in September 1939 to study medicine.

Stokes graduated MB BCh BAO in 1945, training as a house physician at the Meath Hospital, Dublin. Her great-grandfather Whitley Stokes, great-uncle Sir William Stokes and uncle Henry Stokes had connections with Meath Hospital. On 10 February 1946, her car struck and killed a young boy on the Ballybough Road. Stokes was convicted of dangerous driving in August and was sentenced to two-months' imprisonment. This sentence was set aside after an appeal at the circuit court in October. In 1947, Stokes was awarded a certificate in public health by University College Dublin. She wished to become an epidemiologist but was prevented from doing so by the marriage bar.

On 10 September 1946, Stokes married Dr Roderick O'Hanlon at University Church, St Stephen's Green, Dublin. He was an obstetrician and later assistant master of the Rotunda Hospital. They had three sons, Andrew, Paul and Denzil, two of whom predeceased her. She was widowed in 1980.

== Career ==
Stokes trained under Dr Robert Collis at the National Children's Hospital, Harcourt Street. Here she started her work on improving the care and outcomes for children with congenital physical and intellectual disabilities. In 1947, she was appointed assistant physician to St Ultan's Hospital for Infants, and also worked at the Royal City of Dublin Hospital, Baggot Street. During the later 1950s, she was a senior demonstrator in pharmacy and in physiology at the Royal College of Surgeons in Ireland while also developing a private paediatric practice which specialised in neo-natal work. During this period she led a fundraising campaign to upgrade the facilities of the Liberty Creche in Meath Street. The creche had been founded in 1894, and served the working women of The Liberties. Throughout her career, she promoted the Liberty Creche and the establishment and monitoring of new, similar facilities in the 1960s.

Stokes began volunteering with the Association of Parents and Friends of Mentally Handicapped Children from 1955, serving as a volunteer part-time medical director of St Michael's House, and later managing the whole organisation. She established a medical advisory service providing nationwide assessment services in 1959, and became the full-time medical director in 1961, opening a day-care service for children with intellectual disabilities. Working with the parents of the children on medical assessment and advice, Stokes was the public face of the organisation while also undertaking the administration and medical oversight of all the new services and facilities which were opened during the 1960s. An administrator was brought on to manage the non-medical work in the mid 1960s, allowing Stokes to focus on the medical services and provisions.

She advocated for community-centred provision of services, criticising the institutionalisation of those with disabilities. She oversaw the opening of a special care unit which was opened in Ballymun in 1967, and the first clinic at St Michael's House in 1968 with a multi-disciplinary team. While she accepted that residential care was sometimes needed, she strongly advocated for it to be the last resort. Stokes promoted the study of each child within their family setting, highlighting the need to assess the needs of the rest of the family as well to take account of the toll on the wider family from full time caring.

Stokes was a frequent public speaker, and contributed to the 1972 Report of the study group on children's hospital services bringing attention to the needs of the parents and families of those with disabilities. She was a consultant editor on the documentary A long way to go (1978) which investigated the social, emotional and medical issues young people with disabilities faced while attempting to integrate into their communities. She fund-raised extensively with Declan Costello (1927–2011), estimating there were 25,000–30,000 children with disabilities in Ireland. Stokes was often combative in her methods of securing government funding, seeing St Michael's House employ over 200 staff by the mid-1970s, largely funded by the state. She led the development of integrated services at Cheeverstown House and a planned village at Templeogue. Recognising the benefit of evidence-based research, she recruited Roy McConkey as director of research at St Michael's House. Stokes also advocated for the use of emerging technologies in the 1990s that could identify genetic markers for chromosomal disorders.

She was awarded the People of the Year Awards, and the Rose Fitzgerald Kennedy Leadership Award in 1990. Stokes was a patron of the Dublin Homeless Girls' Society, and life governor of Stewart's Hospital, Dublin. In 1976 she became a member and in 1978 a fellow of the Royal College of Physicians of Ireland. She was a member and later president of the Irish Paediatric Association. She sat on the boards of the St Ultan's Hospital from 1980, the British Paediatric Association, the National Rehabilitation Board from 1975 to 1985, the Medico-Social Research Board from 1978 to 1984, the National Health Council from 1985 to 1986, and the National Association for the Mentally Handicapped of Ireland.

Until she retired in 1987, Stokes was a consultant paediatrician to Baggot Street, St Ultan's and Mercer's hospitals. She then joined the board of Cheeverstown House. She suffered from multiple sclerosis for 35 years, and died on 22 March 2009 while living in Leeson Street Nursing Home.

Stokes was one of the women commemorated as part of the Women on Walls initiative in the RCSI in 2019.
