= Margaret Skinnider =

Irish-Scottish revolutionary (1892–1971)

Margaret Frances Skinnider
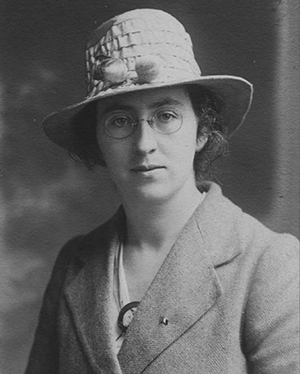
- Skinnider c. 1914
- Born: 28 May 1892; Coatbridge, Lanarkshire, Scotland
- Died: 10 October 1971 (aged 79); Glengeary, Dublin, Ireland
- Military career
- Allegiance: Irish Republic
- Service years: 1915–1923
- Units: Irish Citizen Army; Cumann na mBan
- Conflicts: Easter Rising; Irish War of Independence; Irish Civil War
- Other work: Suffragette, Teacher, Trade Unionist

Margaret Frances Skinnider (28 May 1892 – 10 October 1971) was a revolutionary and feminist born in Coatbridge, Scotland. She fought during the 1916 Easter Rising in Dublin as a sniper, among other roles, and was the only woman wounded in the action. As a scout, she was praised for her bravery. Sadhbh Walshe in The New York Times refers to her as "the schoolteacher turned sniper".

== Early life ==
Margaret Frances Skinnider was born in 1892 to Irish parents in the Lanarkshire town of Coatbridge. She trained as a mathematics teacher and joined Cumann na mBan in Glasgow. She was also involved in the women's suffrage movement, including a protest at Perth Prison. Ironically, she had learned to shoot in a rifle club which had originally been set up so that women could help in defence of the British Empire.

During her trips to Ireland, Skinnider came under the influence of Constance Markievicz and became active in smuggling detonators and bomb-making equipment into Dublin (in her hat) in preparation for the 1916 Easter Rising. Along with Madeleine ffrench-Mullen, she spent time in the hills around Dublin testing dynamite.

When Skinnider was shown "the poorest part of Dublin" by Markievicz, she wrote, "I do not believe there is a worse place in the world." The street was "a hollow full of sewage and refuse", and the building "as full of holes as if it had been under shellfire".

== Easter Rising ==
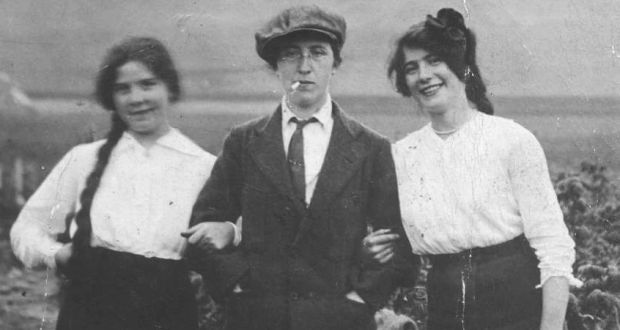
Margaret Skinnider is seen here in the center of this photograph, in men's clothing

Although a member of Cumann na mBan, Skinnider was attached to the Irish Citizen Army during the Rising. Operating variously as a scout, message runner (often dressed as a boy) and sniper, Skinnider took part in action against the British Army at the Garrison at the College of Surgeons and St. Stephen's Green under the Command of General Michael Mallin and Markievicz. Beneath her were 4 men under her command. Skinnider was reportedly an excellent markswoman.

She was seriously wounded when she was shot three times attempting to burn down houses on Harcourt Street to try to cut off the retreat of British soldiers who had planted a machine-gun post on the roof of the University Church. She was treated for her wounds by Nora O'Daly and Madeleine ffrench Mullen, who provided first aid in the College of Surgeons garrison.

Nora Connolly O'Brien describes Skinnider's leading role in this action:

When they were going out to attack the nest of snipers she was in charge of the squad. William Partridge, a very famous man in the working class movement, was there and he and other members of the squad accepted that she was in charge

—

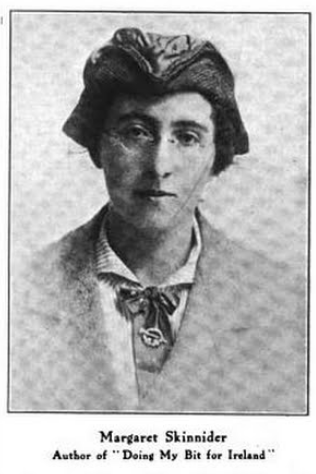
Skinnider as she appeared in "Doing my bit for Ireland"

In her autobiography, Doing my bit for Ireland Skinnider herself vividly describes her role as a sniper at St. Stephen's Green in the Easter Rising:

It was dark there, full of smoke and the din of firing, but it was good to be in action. I could look across the tops of the trees and see the British soldiers on the roof of the Shelbourne. I could also hear their shot hailing against the roof and wall of our fortress, for in truth this building was just that. More than once I saw the man I aimed at fall.

—

In terms of her role as a woman taking part in military action Skinnider comments:

Commandant Mallin [...] finally agreed, though not at all willingly, for he did not want to let a woman run this sort of risk. My answer to this argument was that we had the same right to risk our lives as the men; that in the constitution of the Irish Republic, women were on an equality with men. For the first time in history, indeed, a constitution had been written that incorporated the principle of equal suffrage.

—

The president of Sinn Féin, Gerry Adams, quoted Skinnider's words in his 2006 address to the Sinn Féin Ard Feis.

Skinnider was seriously injured during the Easter Rising, being shot three times, with one of the bullets missing her spine just a quarter of an inch. One of the people fighting alongside her, 17-year-old Fred Ryan, was killed. Lying in the street, she was carried by fellow rebels to the College of Surgeons. She remained there until the order to surrender came, after which she was transferred to St Vincent's Hospital on the other side of the Green. For the next two weeks Skinnider suffered terribly; the bullets she had been shot with were dumdum bullets, which expand after entering the body. Her wounds were treated with corrosive sublimate, but too much was used and as a result they removed all the skin on her back and her side. On top of this she had to fight off a fever and pneumonia.

As all of this was happening, her parents were mistakenly informed that Skinnider had been killed or paralysed. William Partridge, the man who had saved her life, mistakenly thought she had died of her wounds after he left her, and had been saying prayers for her every night in prison. The matter was not cleared up until Nora and Ina Connolly came to visit her in the hospital.

After a number of weeks laid up in hospital, she managed to escape her guards before obtained a travel permit from Dublin Castle which enabled her to return to Scotland. During this time, she visited some of the rebel prisoners being held in Reading Jail in England.

== War of Independence and Civil War ==
Skinnider returned to Dublin later that year before fleeing to the United States in fear of internment. While in America, she collected funds for the republican cause and lectured with other women who had fought in the Easter Rising. Skinnider also wrote and published her autobiography in New York – Doing my Bit for Ireland. Skinnider later returned to Ireland and took up a teaching post in Dublin in 1917. During the Irish War of Independence, she was arrested and imprisoned. In the Irish Civil War, she participated in the Battle of the Four Courts where she served as a courier to the anti-treaty commanders. Following the death of Harry Boland she later became the Paymaster General of the Irish Republican Army until she was arrested on Saint Stephen's Day 1922 and held at North Dublin Union on charges of processing a revolver and ammunition. There she became Director of Training for the prisoners. She remained imprisoned until November 1923, six months after the end of the civil war. She returned to Dublin and took up work with Jim Larkin's Workers' Union of Ireland.

In 1925, Skinnider applied for a wounded pension based on her involvement in the Easter Rising. However, she was turned on the grounds of being a woman (although the fact she had fought on the anti-treaty side in the Civil war was also held against her). She would not receive her pension until 1938, after Eamon De Valera and Fianna Fáil came to power and forced the state to be more amicable to pension requests from those who had fought on the anti-treaty side.

== Later life ==
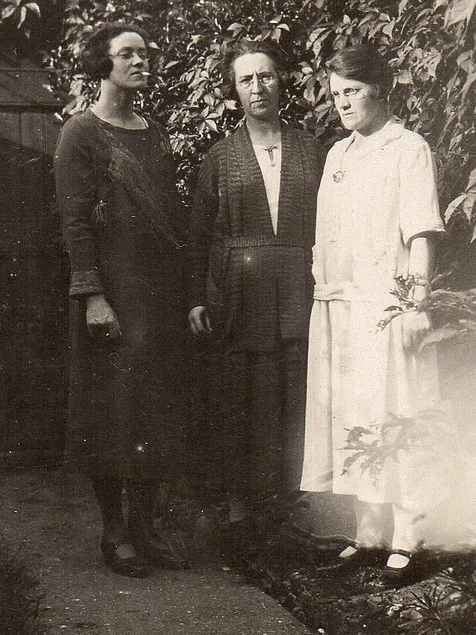
Brigid O'Keeffe, Margaret Skinnider and Nora O'Keeffe in August 1925

After her release from prison, she worked as a teacher at Kings Inn Street Sisters of Charity Primary School in Dublin until her retirement in 1961. She was a member of the Irish National Teachers' Organisation (INTO) throughout her teaching career, and became its president in 1956. She also actively fought for the rights of women, with the marriage bar being a particular target of her campaigning. In 1946, she joined the radical republican party Clann na Poblachta and served on its Ard Comhairle (National Executive Committee) as well as standing as a candidate for the party in the 1950 Irish local elections. In 1954 and 1957, she was nominated as a candidate for the Labour Panel of Seanad Éireann, with her INTO affiliation considered to be a source of credibility for the role.

In 1960, she was made chairperson of the Women's Advisory Committee of the Irish Congress of Trade Unions (ICTU) and from 1961 till 1963 she served on its executive council.

== Personal life ==
Mary McAuliffe, a historian who has written a biography of Skinnider after researching her life, believes Skinnider was a lesbian. Her partner was Nora O’Keeffe whom she met in 1917 while in New York as the two of them had been sent by Eamon De Valera to collect funds for the nationalist cause. By 1919 the two were living together as a couple, remaining together living in Dublin until O’Keeffe's death in 1962. Skinnider was amongst a number of lesbian women who participated in Easter 1916, as she would have fought alongside Kathleen Lynn, Madeleine ffrench-Mullen, Julia Grenan and Elizabeth O'Farrell. These women were featured, along with Eva Gore-Booth and others, in a 2023 TG4 documentary about "the radical queer women at the very heart of the Irish Revolution": Croíthe Radacacha (Radical Hearts).

She spent her last years in Glenageary, County Dublin. She died on 10 October 1971 and was buried next to Markievicz in Glasnevin Cemetery, Dublin. Skinnider was only the third woman to have been buried in the "Republican plot" area of Glasnevin, Markievicz being the first and James Connolly's wife Lillie being the second.
