= William Partridge (Irish revolutionary) =

Irish trade unionist and revolutionary (1874–1917)

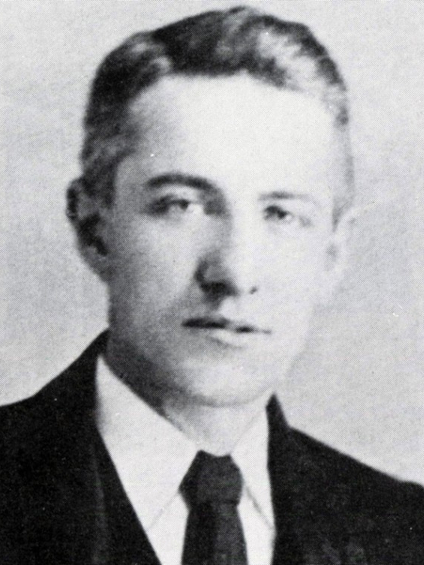
- Born: William Patrick Partridge; 8 March 1874; Sligo, Ireland
- Died: 26 July 1917 (aged 43); Ballaghaderreen, County Roscommon, Ireland
- Burial place: Kilcolman Cemetery
- Military career
- Conflicts: Easter Rising
- Other work: Trade unionist, engineer
- Military career
- Allegiance: Irish Republic
- Service: Irish Citizen Army
- Service years: 1913-17
- Rank: Captain
- Conflicts: Easter Rising

William Patrick Partridge (8 March 1874 – 26 July 1917) was an Irish trade unionist and revolutionary socialist. He was a prominent member of James Connolly's Irish Citizen Army, and fought in the Easter Rising in Dublin 1916. He later served as a Dublin City Councillor.

== Early life ==
Partridge was born in Sligo in 1874; his family lived at 6 Chapel Street after first living in West Gardens. His father, Benjamin Partridge, was an English train driver who moved to Ireland for work, and his mother, Ellen Hall, was an Irish Catholic. His older brother, Felix Partridge (1872–1957), became a noted playwright. The family moved after a short time and he was brought up in Ballaghaderreen, County Roscommon. He was apprenticed at 17 as a mechanical fitter with the Midland & Great Western Railway in Sligo. He was a keen writer from an early age and contributed stories and poems to a magazine called The Shamrock.

== Trade union work ==
At age 22, he was transferred to the railways workshops at Broadstone and later worked at Inchicore in Dublin and here he became involved in the union movement, joining the Amalgamated Society of Engineers. He was involved in the ASE led strikes in 1887 and 1902, making him a pioneer in the developing trade union movement in Ireland.

Partridge established the Inchicore branch of the Gaelic League. He was an organiser of the Irish Transport and General Workers Union, and worked with Jim Larkin to set up union branches outside Dublin. Politically, he was elected to Dublin City Council in 1906 and 1913 as a Sinn Féin councillor. Patridge was one of the leading figures during the 1913 Great Lockout.

== The Rising ==
Partridge was a member of the first Provisional Army Council of the Irish Citizen Army along with Larkin, P.T. Daly, Thomas Foran, Seán O'Casey and Francis Sheehy Skeffington. Connolly sent Partridge to Kerry to supervise the landing of the expected German arms shipment at Fenit. His objective was to use the Transport union members at Fenit Harbour to unload the arms ship Aud, in fact the German ship the SS Libau.

However, the ship was scuttled by the captain Karl Spindler after the planned rendezvous with Roger Casement to unload the arms did not happen and they were then intercepted by the British Navy. After returning to Dublin, Partridge stood as officer of the guard at Liberty Hall as the proclamation of 1916 was being printed the night before the Rising. Partridge fought in the College of Surgeons with Countess Markievicz and Michael Mallin during Easter Week. During the fighting, he carried the wounded female sniper Margaret Skinnider on his back from Harcourt Street corner to the college while under constant fire.

== Death ==
He was sentenced to 15 years of penal servitude, with five years remitted. Seriously ill from Bright's disease, he was released from prison in April 1917. He died in Ballaghaderreen on 26 July 1917, aged 43, and was buried in Kilcolman Cemetery. Countess Markievicz gave the oration at his graveside where she fired a salute over the grave with her own pistol. She described him as the "purest-souled and noblest patriot Ireland ever had".
