= Mary McAuliffe =

Irish historian

Mary McAuliffe FRHS
- Occupations: historian and lecturer

Academic background
- Education: Trinity College Dublin

Academic work
- Institutions: University College Dublin

Mary McAuliffe FRHS is an Irish historian and lecturer, known for her work on women's history in Ireland, sexual violence during the Irish revolutionary period, and LGBTQ history in Ireland.

== Early life and education ==
McAuliffe completed an honours BA in History at Trinity College Dublin (TCD). She subsequently undertook an MA and PhD at TCD.

== Career ==
McAuliffe was appointed assistant professor in gender studies at University College Dublin in 2009, lecturing on Irish women's and gender history, and the history of sexualities.

She served as president of the Women's History Association of Ireland from 2011 to 2014, remaining a member of its committee thereafter. She also served as a member of the advisory council of the National Archives of Ireland from 2012 to 2017, and of the committee of the Irish Association of Professional Historians, including as its treasurer. McAuliffe was appointed to the Advisory Committee on the Representation of Women and Women’s Stories within the collections of the National Cultural Institutions in March 2024. She was elected a fellow of the Royal Historical Society in 2024.

=== Books, media and public talks ===
McAuliffe's latest publications include The Diaries of Kathleen Lynn: A Life Revealed, co-authored with Harriet Wheelock. She co-edited Legacies of the Magdalen Laundries: Commemoration, Gender, and the Post colonial Carceral State with Miriam Haughton and Emilie Pine and wrote Margaret Skinnider, a biography She is co-editor with Jennifer Redmond of The Politics of Gender and Sexuality in Modern Ireland (Four Courts Press, 2024), as well as We Were There: 77 Women of the Easter Rising (with Liz Gillis), and Kerry 1916: Histories and Legacies of the Easter Rising on which she was a co-editor.

As part of the Irish Civil War Memory project, she has conducted interviews and shared her findings about Nan Hogan on RTÉ. McAuliffe has written articles for TheJournal.ie on a variety of sociopolitical topics.

McAuliffe also writes extensively on LGBTQ History. She was involved in a project called LGBT activism in Ireland 1973-2023: Looking back, going forward. McAuliffe also gives public talks on LGBTQ History
