= Elizabeth O'Farrell =

Irish nurse and revolutionary (1883–1957)

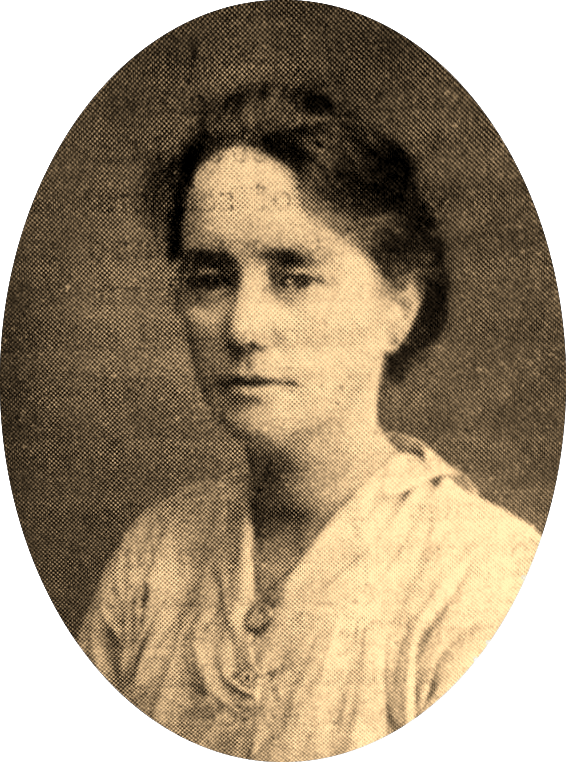
- Born: 5 November 1883; Dublin, Ireland
- Died: 25 June 1957 (aged 73); Bray, County Wicklow, Ireland
- Occupations: Midwife, nurse
- Known for: Delivering the surrender of the rebels during the Easter Rising

Elizabeth O'Farrell (Irish: Éilís Ní Fhearghail; 5 November 1883 – 25 June 1957) was an Irish nurse, republican and member of Cumann na mBan, best known for delivering the surrender in the Easter Rising of 1916.

== Early life ==
Elizabeth O'Farrell was born on 5 November 1883 in City Quay Dublin, she was the daughter of Christopher O'Farrell, who worked at Armstrong's printers and Margaret Kenneah, a housekeeper. She was educated by the Sisters of Mercy. Her father died when she was young and she was sent to work. She took a job in Armstrong's, a printers in Amiens Street. Her mother had a small shop on the City Quay Dublin.

She was a member of the Sacred Heart and Total Abstinence sodalities. After her education, she became a midwife and joined the national maternity hospital Holles Street after her involvement in the 1916 Easter Rising. She was a part of the Gaelic League and became fluent in Irish. In 1906 she joined Inghinidhe na hÉireann alongside lifelong friend - and most likely lover and romantic partner - Julia Grenan. She also then joined Cumann na mBan, the women's branch of the Irish Volunteers after its establishment in 1914.

== Easter Rising ==
O'Farrell acted as a dispatcher before and during the Easter Rising of 1916. She was sent to Athenry to deliver a despatch on Easter Monday. On her return, she reported with her lifelong friend and fellow nurse, Julia Grenan, at the GPO. They were sent around the bullet-torn streets of Dublin during the week with despatches, food and ammunition hidden in their long skirts to stations at Boland's Mill, Powers' Distillery, Jacobs' Factory, St. Stephen's Green and the Four Courts. With Grenan, she also cared for the wounded, including James Connolly. Women and wounded were evacuated from the GPO on the Friday of Easter Week, but O'Farrell, Grenan and Winifred Carney stayed behind with the remainder of the troops, who retreated to a nearby house in Moore Street.

On Saturday, Patrick Pearse chose O'Farrell to seek surrender terms from Brigadier-General Lowe. At 12.45 pm she was handed a Red Cross insignia and a white flag and asked to deliver the surrender to the British military. She emerged into heavy fire on Moore Street which abated when her white flag was recognised. She was taken to Brigadier General William Lowe who sent her back to Pearse at number 16 Moore Street with a demand for unconditional surrender. Pearse agreed and, accompanied by O'Farrell, surrendered in person to General Lowe. A well-known photograph shows Pearse facing General Lowe at the top of Moore Street. Just before the photograph was taken, O'Farrell stepped back. In the original photograph, her feet are visible next to Pearse. This photograph was published 10 days later in the Daily Sketch newspaper. In subsequent reproductions, her feet were airbrushed out. This has led some modern commentators to claim that she was "airbrushed from history". In fact, O'Farrell's role in the surrender was covered in detail in books published throughout the 20th century, such as Dorothy Macardle's The Irish Republic (1937), Max Caulfield's The Easter Rebellion (1963) and Foy and Barton's The Easter Rising (1999).

== Aftermath ==
Accompanied by a priest and three soldiers, O'Farrell brought the order to surrender, signed by Pearse, to the Volunteer and Citizen Army units at the Four Courts, the College of Surgeons, Boland's Mill and Jacob's factory. Lowe gave her his word that she would not be held as a prisoner after delivering these orders.

O'Farrell was then taken to the Dublin Castle hospital where she was stripped of her clothing and possessions and stayed for one night. The following day she was taken to Ship Street Barracks, and informed that she was to be sent to Kilmainham Gaol and held as a prisoner. O'Farrell and some other prisoners were escorted to Richmond Barracks. It was then that O'Farrell noticed Fr. Columbus of Church Street, who had accompanied her to the Four Courts on the evening of 29 April. He told her he would let General Lowe know of her situation. General Lowe sent a car for O'Farrell to be taken to Dublin Castle where she was to meet him. General Lowe apologised for her detainment and provided her with a letter in case of any further trouble with the military.

== Life after The Rising ==
Julia Grenan

O'Farrell spent the rest of her life working as a midwife and nurse in the National Maternity Hospital, Dublin. When the Irish Government allowed the Bureau of Military History to begin collecting oral history of the Irish Revolutionary period for historical purposes, O'Farrell refused to participate, declaring: "All governments since 1921 have betrayed the Republic."

In the fifties she made speeches on behalf of the republican movement and raised funds for republican prisoners.

O'Farrell died aged 73 on 25 June 1957, while on holiday in Fatima House in Bray, County Wicklow, and she is buried in the Glasnevin Cemetery next to Julia Grenan in the republican plot.

That O'Farrell and Grenan were romantic partners is now widely considered to be the case. The significant closeness they displayed, the fact they lived together for 30 years, the fact that neither was ever married to a man and the fact they were buried beside each other are all considered indicators of a more intimate relationship than publicly stated. Similarly, their comrades in the 1916 Rising, Kathleen Lynn and Madeleine ffrench-Mullen, are also considered to be another "unstated" couple, as were Margaret Skinnider and Nora O'Keeffe, all of whom were featured, along with Eva Gore-Booth and others, in a 2023 TG4 documentary about "the radical queer women at the very heart of the Irish Revolution": Croíthe Radacacha (Radical Hearts).

== Commemorations ==
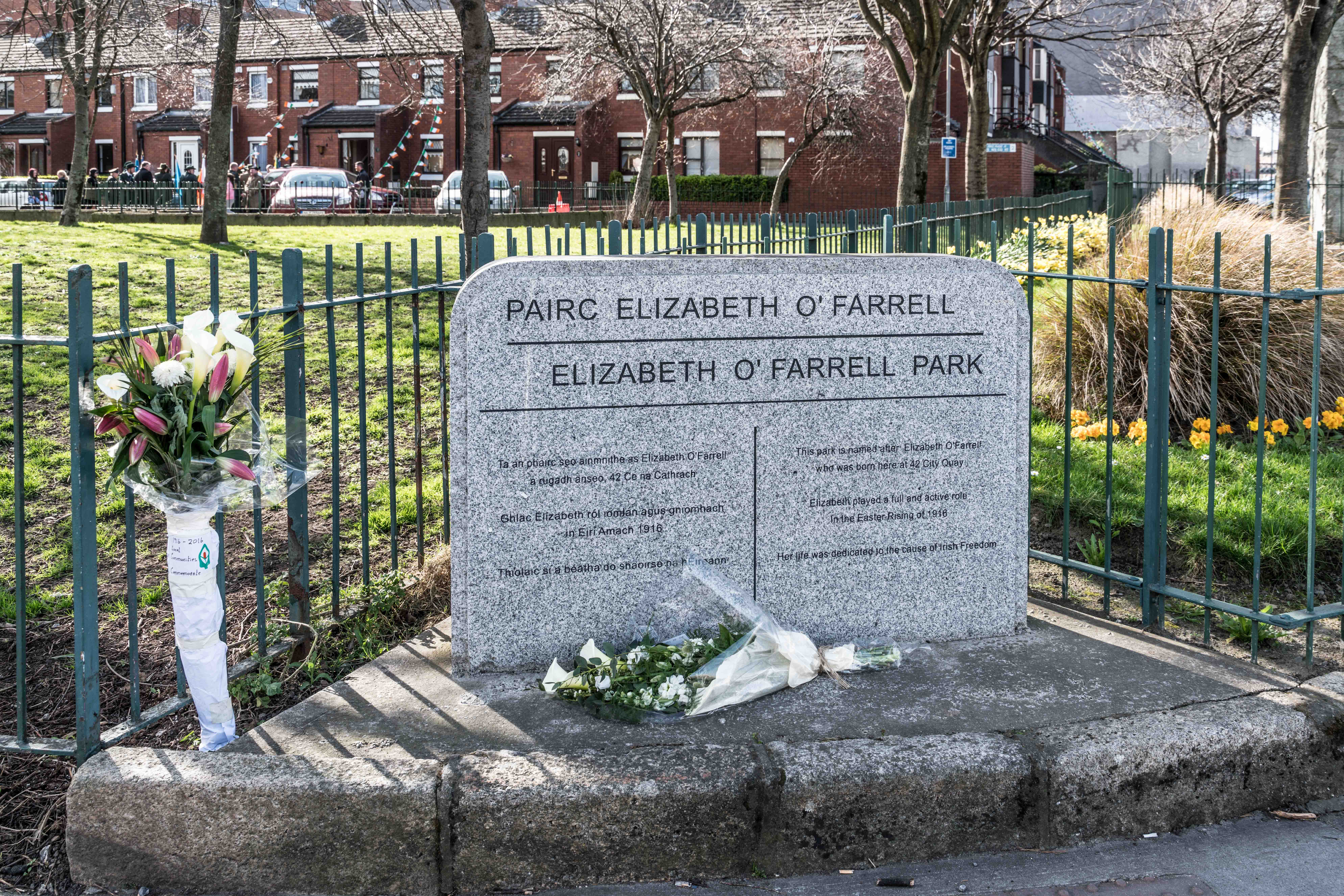
Memorial at Elizabeth O'Farrell Park, Dublin

After her death, the Nurse Elizabeth O'Farrell Foundation was established in 1967 to help support nursing postgraduate studies. A memorial plaque was also unveiled in Holles Street Hospital where she trained as a midwife from 1920 to 1921. Every year, the hospital awards a student the 'Elizabeth O'Farrell' commemorative award, which is a silver medal awarded to a student midwife who exceeds academically in their final exams for qualification as a midwife.

In 2003 another plaque was unveiled in City Quay park commemorating her. O'Farrell was born close by to this area. In 2012, what was originally the City Quay park, is now known as the Elizabeth O'Farrell Park on Sir John Rogersons Quay, Dublin.

In 2016, RTÉ aired a television series giving insight into the Rising for its 100-year anniversary. The series, by RTÉ's Cláracha Gaeilge unit – called Réabhlóid (English: 'Revolution') – aired four episodes with the final one commemorating Nurse O'Farrell. Episode 4 – 'Famous and Invisible' tells the story of O'Farrell's role in the surrender and looks at how she was allegedly airbrushed out from the original image of the surrender. The episode looks at lesser known characters of 1916, including O'Farrell.

== Bibliography ==
- Hogan, M. (2004). Elizabeth O'Farrell and surrender, 1916. Discovering Women in Irish History. Retrieved 21 November 2016, from: 3.1.8 Elizabeth O'Farrell and surrender, 1916
- Brosnan, M. (n.d.) Elizabeth O'Farrell, The National Maternity Hospital. Retrieved 2 February 2018.
- Ni Cheallaigh, L. (Producer & Director) (2016). Réabhlóid. (Motion Picture). Ireland. RTÉ.
- Central Statistics Office. (n.d.) Elizabeth O'Farrell. Census and Women of the Rising. Ireland. CSO. Retrieved 21 November 2016
- Author unknown. (28 August 2012). City Quay Park now known as Elizabeth O'Farrell Park on Sir John Rogerson's Quay, Dublin. Irish Volunteers. Retrieved 20 November 2016 from City Quay Park now known as Elizabeth O'Farrell Park on Sir John Rogersons Quay, Dublin.
- Barry, M. (10 March 2016). Airbrushed from history? Elizabeth O'Farrell and Patrick Pearse's surrender, 1916. The Irish History. Retrieved 10 November 2016 from Airbrushed out of history? Elizabeth O'Farrell and Patrick Pearse’s surrender, 1916.
- Granville, D. (2004). Irish Democrat Archive : Features : The Irish Revolutionary Women of Cumann na mBan. Archive.irishdemocrat.co.uk. Retrieved 22 November 2016, from The Irish Revolutionary Women of Cumann na mBan
- Story of the surrender (2011, April). Retrieved 23 November 2016, from 1916 Rebellion Museum | Story of the Surrender

=== Writings ===
- O'Farrell, Elizabeth, "Events of Easter Week", The Catholic Bulletin 1917.
- O'Farrell, Elizabeth, & Julia Grenan, 1972, Memorial Card, Kilmainham Collection (KGC).

=== Primary sources ===
- Doherty, Shuna,
- Henderson, Fr Enna, Cistercian Abbey Roscrea, Testimony, 1997, Kilmainham Gaol Collection (KGC)
- Interview with Tove O'Flanagan and Jill Andrews of the National Maternity Hospital 2003.

=== Secondary sources ===
- McCoole, Sinead, No Ordinary Women: Irish Female Activists in the Revolutionary Years 1900–1923 (Dublin, 2003).
