= Kathleen Lynn =

Irish politician, political activist and doctor (1874–1955)

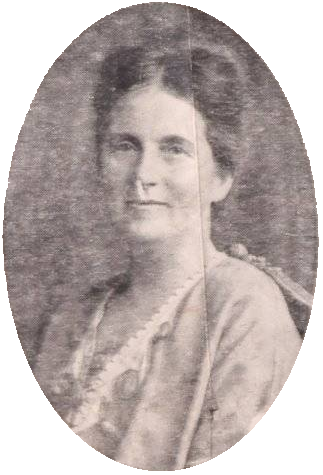
- Lynn in a 1927 piece of election material

Vice President of Sinn Féin
- In office 1923–1927
- Leader: Éamon de Valera

Teachta Dála
- In office August 1923 – June 1927
- Constituency: Dublin County

Personal details
- Born: 28 January 1874 Killala, County Mayo, Ireland
- Died: 14 September 1955 (aged 81) Dublin, Ireland
- Education: Royal University of Ireland

Military service
- Branch/service: Irish Citizen Army
- Rank: Captain/Chief Medical Officer
- Battles/wars: Easter Rising

Kathleen Florence Lynn (28 January 1874 – 14 September 1955) was an Irish Sinn Féin politician, political activist and doctor.

Lynn was so greatly affected by the poverty and disease among the poor in the west of Ireland that, at 16, she decided to be a doctor. She was educated in England and Germany, before enrolling in the Royal University of Ireland, a forerunner to the UCD School of Medicine. Following her graduation in 1899, Lynn went to the United States, where she worked for ten years, before returning to Ireland to become the first female doctor at the Royal Victoria Eye and Ear Hospital (1910–1916).

She was an active participant in the women's suffragist and labour and movements, and as a member of the Irish Citizen Army, imprisoned for her part in the 1916 Easter Rising, was a prominent Protestant Irish nationalist.

Frustrated by Sinn Féin's refusal to embrace social reform and universal health care, in 1927 she withdrew from politics and dedicated her remaining years to the work of Saint Ultan's Children's Hospital which she had help found in 1919.

== Personal life ==
Kathleen Lynn was born on 28 January 1874 in the townland of Mullafarry, near Killala in County Mayo, to a Church of Ireland clergyman, Robert Young Lynn, and his wife, Catherine Wynne, and was their second of four children. Her mother, Catherine, was a great granddaughter of Owen Wynne of Hazelwood House, County Sligo.

In 1882, the family moved to Shrule in County Longford where her father took over as the clergyman of the Ballymahon parish. Later on in her young life, in 1886 Lynn and her family moved to Cong, a village bordering Mayo and Galway, to where her father's parish was being funded by the Lady Ardilaun of Ashford Castle. She was sent to the Alexandra College, of which Lady Ardilaun was the patron, in Dublin, which she attended till she was sixteen years old. She was distantly related to Countess Markievicz through her aunt's marriage. Growing up in the aftermath of The Great Famine (1845 – 1852), She was deeply saddened by the deadly diseases and poverty suffered by the people in her local area. This led to her desire at sixteen, when she left school, to become a doctor.

Lynn's family didn't approve of her role in the Rising. In fact, at the time, Lynn's family were so disgusted with her activities that they would not let her return home to Cong, County Mayo, for Christmas. She instead had to spend Christmas 1917 with her aunt Florence in Dublin. She did the same the following year. This personal split was eventually settled before her father's death in 1923.

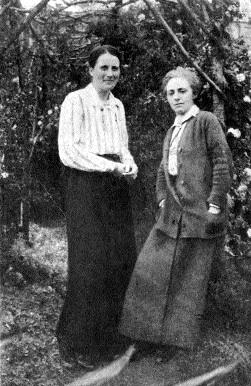
Kathleen and Madeleine pictured together in 1919

Lynn lived in Rathmines from 1903 to her death in 1955, sharing her home with her life partner Madeleine ffrench-Mullen. She also had a holiday cottage in Glenmalure, County Wicklow - not far from Glendalough where a number of her Wynne cousins lived. She left the cottage to An Óige, the Irish youth hostel association, on her death.

Lynn wrote a diary from Easter 1916 until 1955, beginning with her involvement in the 1916 Rising until two months before her death.

== Education ==
In 1891 Lynn went as a boarder to Alexandra College, Dublin, from where she matriculated in 1893 from the Royal University of Ireland. From October 1897 Lynn took classes at the Catholic University of Ireland's school of medicine in Cecilia Street, Dublin, and in the Royal College of Surgeons of Ireland. In 1898 she won the Barker anatomical prize awarded by the college. She graduated MB BCh BAO from the Royal University of Ireland in 1899. Lynn conducted her internships at Holles Street Hospital (1897–99), the Rotunda Hospital (1899), the Royal Victoria Eye and Ear Hospital (1899), and at the Richmond Lunatic Asylum. In 1898 Lynn was appointed the first woman resident doctor at Dublin's Adelaide Hospital, but staff opposition to her appointment meant she did not take up the post. She completed postgraduate work in the United States in the early 1900s before working as a duty doctor at hospitals in the city of Dublin as part of her wider general practice based at her home at 9 Belgrave Road, Rathmines, Dublin. Lynn became a fellow of the Royal College of Physicians of Ireland in 1909, and was promoted to clinical assistant in the Royal Victoria Eye and Ear Hospital in the same year.

== Political activity ==
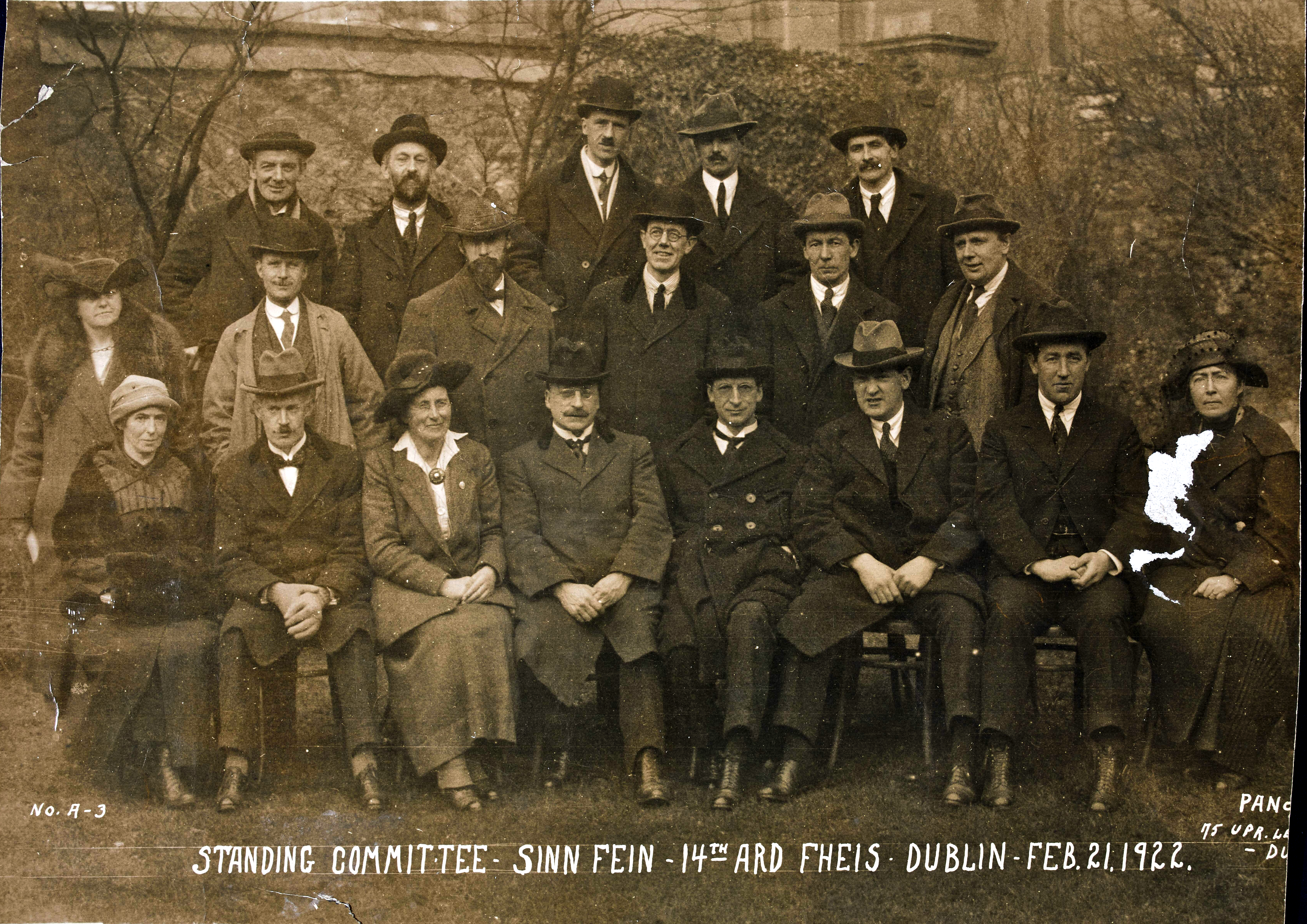
Lynn (Front row, third from left) as part of Sinn Féin's national executive in 1922

Lynn was a member of the executive committee of the Irish Women's Suffragette and Local Government Association (IWSLGA) from 1903, and remained on the executive until 1916. Lynn was a member of the radical British Women's Social and Political Union (WSPU) from 1908 and she was also said to be on friendly terms with the suffragist Sylvia Pankhurst. She was part of a mass meeting in 1912, demanding that women's suffrage be included in the Third Home Rule Bill of that year.

Lynn supported the workers during the 1913 lock-out and worked with Constance Markievicz and others in the soup kitchens in Liberty Hall, becoming close to Markievicz and James Connolly. In 1913, at Markievicz's request, she treated Helena Molony. Molony, who was active in a number of political movements, stayed with Lynn in her Rathmines home following an illness. As a result of the influence of Molony and Markievicz, Lynn became an active participant in the suffragist, labour and nationalist movements. "We used to have long talks and she converted me to the National Movement," Lynn wrote. She joined the Irish Citizen Army and was chief medical officer during the 1916 Easter Rising. She described herself as "a Red Cross doctor and a belligerent" when she was arrested.

For her part in the Rising, Lynn was imprisoned for a week in the Ship Street Barracks, before being transferred to Richmond Barracks and then to Kilmainham Gaol, where she was held with her comrades Markievicz, Molony and Madeleine ffrench-Mullen. Lynn remained active in the Nationalist movement; she was elected vice-president of the Sinn Féin executive in 1917 and in 1923, Lynn was elected to Dáil Éireann as an anti-Treaty Sinn Féin Teachta Dála (TD) for the Dublin County constituency at the 1923 general election. In accordance with Sinn Féin abstentionist policy of the time, she did not take her seat in Dáil Éireann. She lost her seat in the June 1927 general election. She unsuccessfully contested the August 1927 by-election for Dublin County. Lynn claimed, many years after the 1916 rising, that it was suffrage that converted her to republicanism, saying: "I saw that people got the wrong impression about suffrage and that led me to examine the Irish question." She was given a gold fibula bone-shaped brooch as a token of gratitude from the Irish Citizen Army for her help in the medical preparation for the Rising.

During the Irish War of Independence, Lynn assisted Michael Collins in evading capture by the British.

Lynn eventually left politics in 1927, increasingly frustrated by Sinn Féin's refusal to embrace social reform and health care.

== Medical career ==
Lynn decided to become a doctor when she was 16. She was one of the first female medical graduates from University College Dublin. Lynn became politically active and worked in Liberty Hall providing food and care for the poor and destitute families during the turbulent time of the 1913 Dublin Lock-Out. Lynn's medical career was defined by her work at Saint Ultan's Children's Hospital, which she established in Dublin in 1919, with a group of female activists. Lynn's work with Dublin's inner-city poor had convinced her of the need for a hospital to provide medical and educational facilities for impoverished mothers and infants. Earlier in her career, Lynn had experienced discrimination in applying for hospital positions due to her gender, and Saint Ultan's was the only hospital in Ireland entirely managed by women. Saint Ultan's Hospital grew rapidly, and from 1937 became the centre for BCG vaccination in Ireland. The hospital closed in 1983.

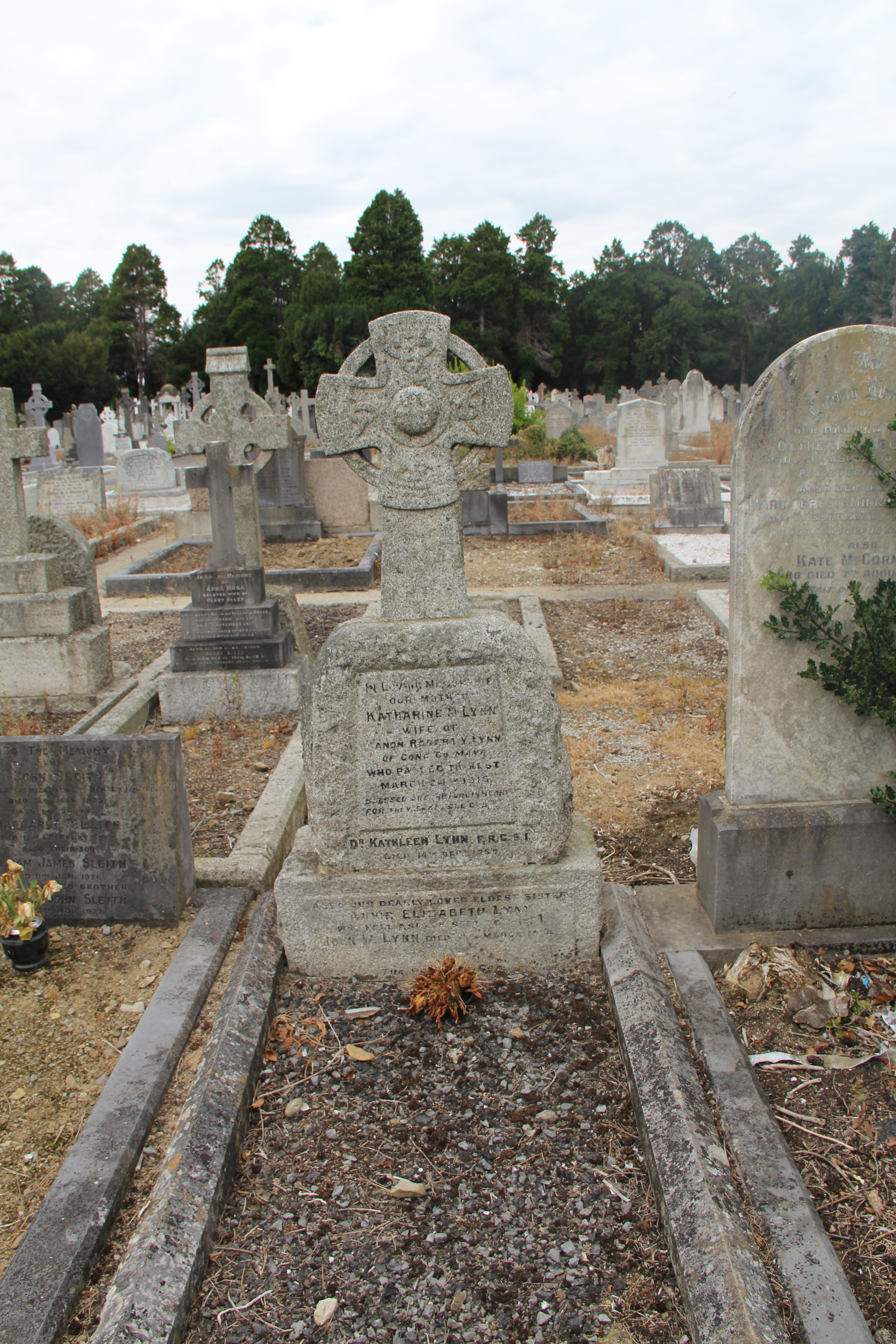
Grave of Kathleen Lynn, Deansgrange cemetery, County Dublin

Lynn was the chief medical officer for the Irish Citizen Army. At the request of rebel leader James Connolly she joined the Irish Citizen's Army during the 1916 rising and was appointed as Captain and Chief Medical Officer. She provided medical training to members of the ICA and also taught the Cumann na mBan. Lynn (along with writer Seán O'Casey) advocated the use of the Irish language in Church of Ireland liturgy and many events for Saint Ultan's Hospital were advertised in the Irish language.

== Death and legacy ==
Lynn died on 14 September 1955, and was buried in the family plot at Dean's Grange Cemetery with full military honours in recognition of her role in the Rising and the War of Independence. She was so well known that crowds in Dublin lined the streets to show their respects.

After Lynn's death, Éamon de Valera set up the Kathleen Lynn Memorial Committee, which lasted for eight years and resulted in the opening of a surgical unit at Saint Ultan's Children's Hospital in 1964, but ended in 1975 due to funding difficulties.

Four diaries recorded by Lynn between 1916 and 1955 were transcribed over two years by librarian Margaret Connolly. The detailed diaries chronicle her medical, political and social life and were donated to the Royal College of Physicians in Ireland archive by her family in 1997, which also holds the administrative papers of Saint Ultan's Hospital. They provided source material for the 2010 documentary entitled Kathleen Lynn – An Dochtúir Reabhlóideach by Loop Line Film and director Sé Merry Doyle. The Diaries of Kathleen Lynn: A Life Revealed through Personal Writing edited by Mary McAuliffe and Harriet Wheelock were published in October 2023.

Historian Margaret Ó hÓgartaigh wrote her biography, Kathleen Lynn, Irishwoman, Patriot, Doctor (Irish Academic Press, 2006).

Lynn is used as a character in the novel The Pull of the Stars (2020) by Emma Donoghue, set in a Dublin hospital in 1918.

=== Relationship with ffrench-Mullen ===
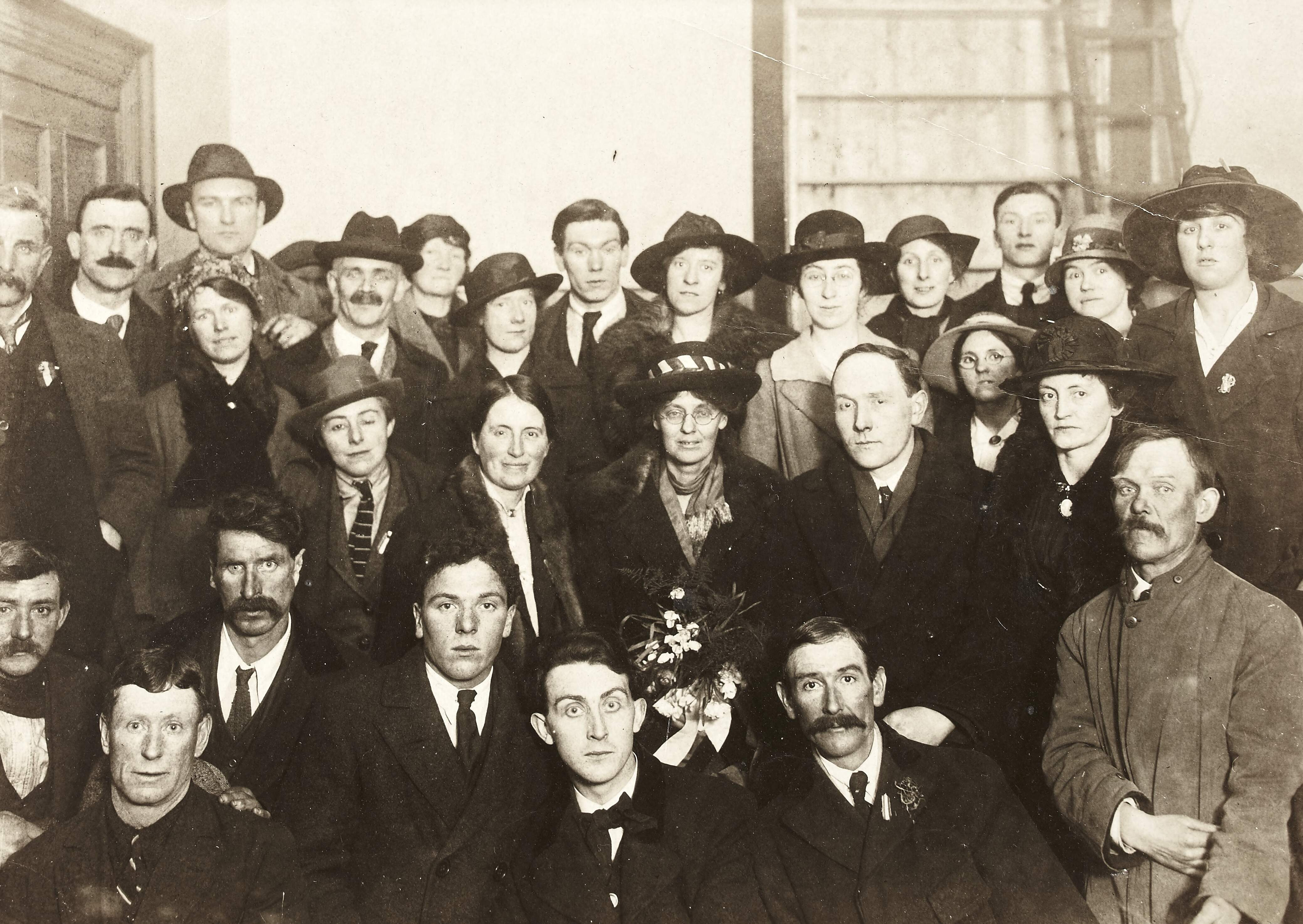
This photograph from March 1919 shows Lynn and ffrench-Mullen attending a party celebrating the release of Constance Markievicz from prison. Lynn can be seen to the left of centrally placed Markievicz, while ffrench-Mullen is to the left of Lynn, dressed in men's clothes.

Modern examinations of their lives have led many people to consider that Lynn and Madeleine ffrench-Mullen were a same-sex couple. The remarkable closeness they shared, the fact they never married men, and the fact that they lived together in the same house until Madeleine's death, are all now taken into account when discussing their lives. It has also been suggested that their fellow 1916 Rising comrades, Julia Grenan and Elizabeth O'Farrell, were in a similar arrangement, and that Margaret Skinnider was another lesbian participant in the rising. These women were featured, along with Eva Gore-Booth and others, in the 2023 TG4 documentary Croíthe Radacacha (Radical Hearts) about "the radical queer women at the very heart of the Irish Revolution": .

== Sources ==
- Ó hÓgartaigh, Margaret (2006). Kathleen Lynn: Irishwoman, Patriot, Doctor. Irish Academic Press.

Party political offices
| Preceded by Arthur Griffith; Michael O'Flanagan | Vice President of Sinn Féin with P. J. Ruttledge (1923–1926); 1923–1927 | Succeeded by Mary MacSwiney; John Madden |

| Dáil | Election | Deputy (Party) | Deputy (Party) | Deputy (Party) | Deputy (Party) | Deputy (Party) | Deputy (Party) | Deputy (Party) | Deputy (Party) |
|---|---|---|---|---|---|---|---|---|---|
| 2nd | 1921 | Michael Derham (SF) | George Gavan Duffy (SF) | Séamus Dwyer (SF) | Desmond FitzGerald (SF) | Frank Lawless (SF) | Margaret Pearse (SF) | 6 seats 1921–1923 | |
| 3rd | 1922 | Michael Derham (PT-SF) | George Gavan Duffy (PT-SF) | Thomas Johnson (Lab) | Desmond FitzGerald (PT-SF) | Darrell Figgis (Ind) | John Rooney (FP) | 6 seats 1921–1923 | |
| 4th | 1923 | Michael Derham (CnaG) | Bryan Cooper (Ind) | Thomas Johnson (Lab) | Desmond FitzGerald (CnaG) | Darrell Figgis (Ind) | John Good (Ind) | Kathleen Lynn (Rep) | Kevin O'Higgins (CnaG) |
| 4th | 1924 by-election | Batt O'Connor (CnaG) | Bryan Cooper (Ind) | Thomas Johnson (Lab) | Desmond FitzGerald (CnaG) | Darrell Figgis (Ind) | John Good (Ind) | Kathleen Lynn (Rep) | Kevin O'Higgins (CnaG) |
| 4th | 1926 by-election | Batt O'Connor (CnaG) | Bryan Cooper (Ind) | Thomas Johnson (Lab) | Desmond FitzGerald (CnaG) | William Norton (Lab) | John Good (Ind) | Kathleen Lynn (Rep) | Kevin O'Higgins (CnaG) |
| 5th | 1927 (Jun) | Batt O'Connor (CnaG) | Bryan Cooper (Ind) | Thomas Johnson (Lab) | Desmond FitzGerald (CnaG) | Patrick Belton (FF) | John Good (Ind) | Seán MacEntee (FF) | Kevin O'Higgins (CnaG) |
| 5th | 1927 by-election | Batt O'Connor (CnaG) | Bryan Cooper (Ind) | Thomas Johnson (Lab) | Desmond FitzGerald (CnaG) | Patrick Belton (FF) | John Good (Ind) | Seán MacEntee (FF) | Gearóid O'Sullivan (CnaG) |
| 6th | 1927 (Sep) | Batt O'Connor (CnaG) | Bryan Cooper (CnaG) | Joseph Murphy (Ind) | Desmond FitzGerald (CnaG) | Seán Brady (FF) | John Good (Ind) | Seán MacEntee (FF) | Gearóid O'Sullivan (CnaG) |
| 6th | 1930 by-election | Batt O'Connor (CnaG) | Thomas Finlay (CnaG) | Joseph Murphy (Ind) | Desmond FitzGerald (CnaG) | Seán Brady (FF) | John Good (Ind) | Seán MacEntee (FF) | Gearóid O'Sullivan (CnaG) |
| 7th | 1932 | Batt O'Connor (CnaG) | Thomas Finlay (CnaG) | Patrick Curran (Lab) | Henry Dockrell (CnaG) | Seán Brady (FF) | John Good (Ind) | Seán MacEntee (FF) | Gearóid O'Sullivan (CnaG) |
| 8th | 1933 | Batt O'Connor (CnaG) | John A. Costello (CnaG) | Margaret Mary Pearse (FF) | Henry Dockrell (CnaG) | Seán Brady (FF) | John Good (Ind) | Seán MacEntee (FF) | Gearóid O'Sullivan (CnaG) |
| 8th | 1935 by-election | Cecil Lavery (FG) | John A. Costello (CnaG) | Margaret Mary Pearse (FF) | Henry Dockrell (CnaG) | Seán Brady (FF) | John Good (Ind) | Seán MacEntee (FF) | Gearóid O'Sullivan (CnaG) |
| 9th | 1937 | Cecil Lavery (FG) | Henry Dockrell (FG) | Gerrard McGowan (Lab) | Patrick Fogarty (FF) | Seán Brady (FF) | 5 seats 1937–1948 | | |
| 10th | 1938 | Patrick Belton (FG) | Henry Dockrell (FG) | Thomas Mullen (FF) | Patrick Fogarty (FF) | Seán Brady (FF) | 5 seats 1937–1948 | | |
| 11th | 1943 | Liam Cosgrave (FG) | Henry Dockrell (FG) | James Tunney (Lab) | Patrick Fogarty (FF) | Seán Brady (FF) | 5 seats 1937–1948 | | |
| 12th | 1944 | Liam Cosgrave (FG) | Henry Dockrell (FG) | Patrick Burke (FF) | Patrick Fogarty (FF) | Seán Brady (FF) | 5 seats 1937–1948 | | |
| 12th | 1947 by-election | Liam Cosgrave (FG) | Henry Dockrell (FG) | Patrick Burke (FF) | Seán MacBride (CnaP) | Seán Brady (FF) | 5 seats 1937–1948 | | |
| 13th | 1948 | Éamon Rooney (FG) | Seán Dunne (Lab) | Patrick Burke (FF) | 3 seats 1948–1961 | | | | |
| 14th | 1951 | Éamon Rooney (FG) | Seán Dunne (Lab) | Patrick Burke (FF) | 3 seats 1948–1961 | | | | |
| 15th | 1954 | Éamon Rooney (FG) | Seán Dunne (Lab) | Patrick Burke (FF) | 3 seats 1948–1961 | | | | |
| 16th | 1957 | Éamon Rooney (FG) | Kevin Boland (FF) | Patrick Burke (FF) | 3 seats 1948–1961 | | | | |
| 17th | 1961 | Éamon Rooney (FG) | Kevin Boland (FF) | Patrick Burke (FF) | Mark Clinton (FG) | Seán Dunne (Ind) | 5 seats 1961–1969 | | |
| 18th | 1965 | Des Foley (FF) | Kevin Boland (FF) | Patrick Burke (FF) | Mark Clinton (FG) | Seán Dunne (Lab) | 5 seats 1961–1969 | | |
| 19th | 1969 | Constituency abolished. See Dublin County North and Dublin County South | | | | | | | |
