= Madeleine ffrench-Mullen =

Irish revolutionary and labour activist (1880–1944)

- ffrench-Mullen, c. 1917

Personal details
- Born: 30 December 1880 Malta
- Died: 26 May 1944 (aged 63) Dublin, Ireland
- Occupation: Labour activist

Military service
- Allegiance: Irish Citizen Army
- Rank: Lieutenant
- Battles/wars: Easter Rising

Madeleine ffrench-Mullen (30 December 1880 – 26 May 1944) was an Irish revolutionary and labour activist who took part in the Easter Rising in Dublin in 1916.

Ffrench-Mullen was a member of the radical nationalist women's organisation Inghinidhe na hÉireann. In 1913 during the Dublin Lock-out, she worked in the soup kitchen in Liberty Hall. She subsequently joined the Irish Citizen Army (ICA). In the Easter Rising she worked in a first-aid tent. She was arrested after the Rising but released the following month. She joined Sinn Féin and was elected to Rathmines District Council in 1920.

== Early life ==
Madeleine ffrench-Mullen was born on 30 December 1880 in Malta, where her father, St Lawrence ffrench-Mullen, a Royal Navy surgeon, was stationed. She had two brothers, St Lawrence Patrick Joseph (1890–1891) and Douglas (1893–1943).

== Women rights and the suffrage movement ==
Ffrench-Mullen's interest in politics started young, Her father was a committed Parnellite and their Dundrum home was a campaign headquarters. She was a radical feminist and republican during her life. Like many other of the time she regarded it as a woman's right to vote. She joined the suffrage movement, and met women with a similar worldview and values. The women's suffrage movement was included in the Movements of Extremists reports of the Dublin Metropolitan Police. Ffrench-Mullen went on to join Inghinidhe na hÉireann, a radical nationalist women's group founded by Maud Gonne in 1900. The organisation developed into Cumann na mBan in 1913. Suffragist values were central to Cumann na mBan's goal of standing side-by-side with men in the fight for the Irish Republic. Some members saw this as women regaining the rights that had belonged to them in pre-invasion Gaelic civilisation. Ffrench-Mullen was on the socialist wing of the moment, holding to the ideals of universal social equality of the syndicalist James Connolly and the Irish Citizen Army.

== 1916 Easter Rising ==
During the 1916 Easter Rising, ffrench-Mullen served as a lieutenant in the Irish Citizen Army. She saw action with the St Stephen's Green and Royal College of Surgeons garrison. In St Stephen's Green she was in command of the 15 Citizen Army women who set up a medical station and field kitchen. While occupying St Stephen's Green, she and her comrades came under sustained heavy fire from the Shellbourne Hotel and buildings on the north side of the Green. After the surrender of the College of Surgeons garrison ffrench-Mullen was one of the 77 women who had fought in the Rising who were imprisoned, among them her life partner Kathleen Lynn. While in captivity ffrench Mullen was moved three times, spending time in Richmond Barracks, Kilmainham Gaol and Mountjoy Jail. She was released on 5 June 1916.

== Ffrench-Mullen and Kathleen Lynn ==
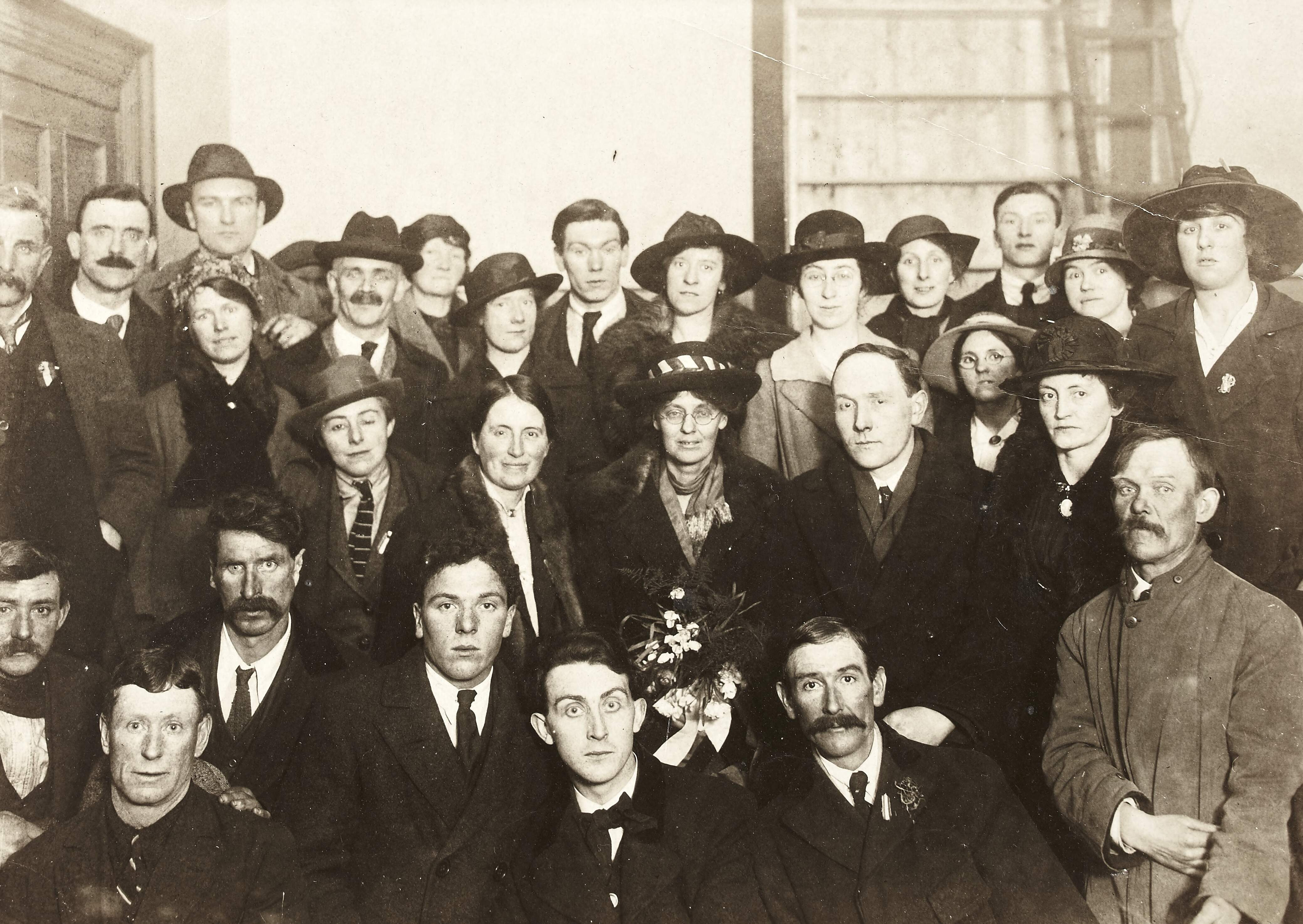
This photograph from March 1919 shows Lynn and ffrench-Mullen attending a party celebrating the release of Constance Markievicz from prison. Lynn can be seen to the left of centrally placed Markievicz, while ffrench-Mullen is to the left of Lynn, dressed in men's clothes.

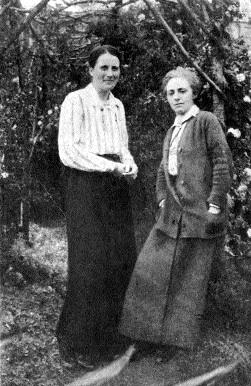
Kathleen and Madeleine pictured together in 1919

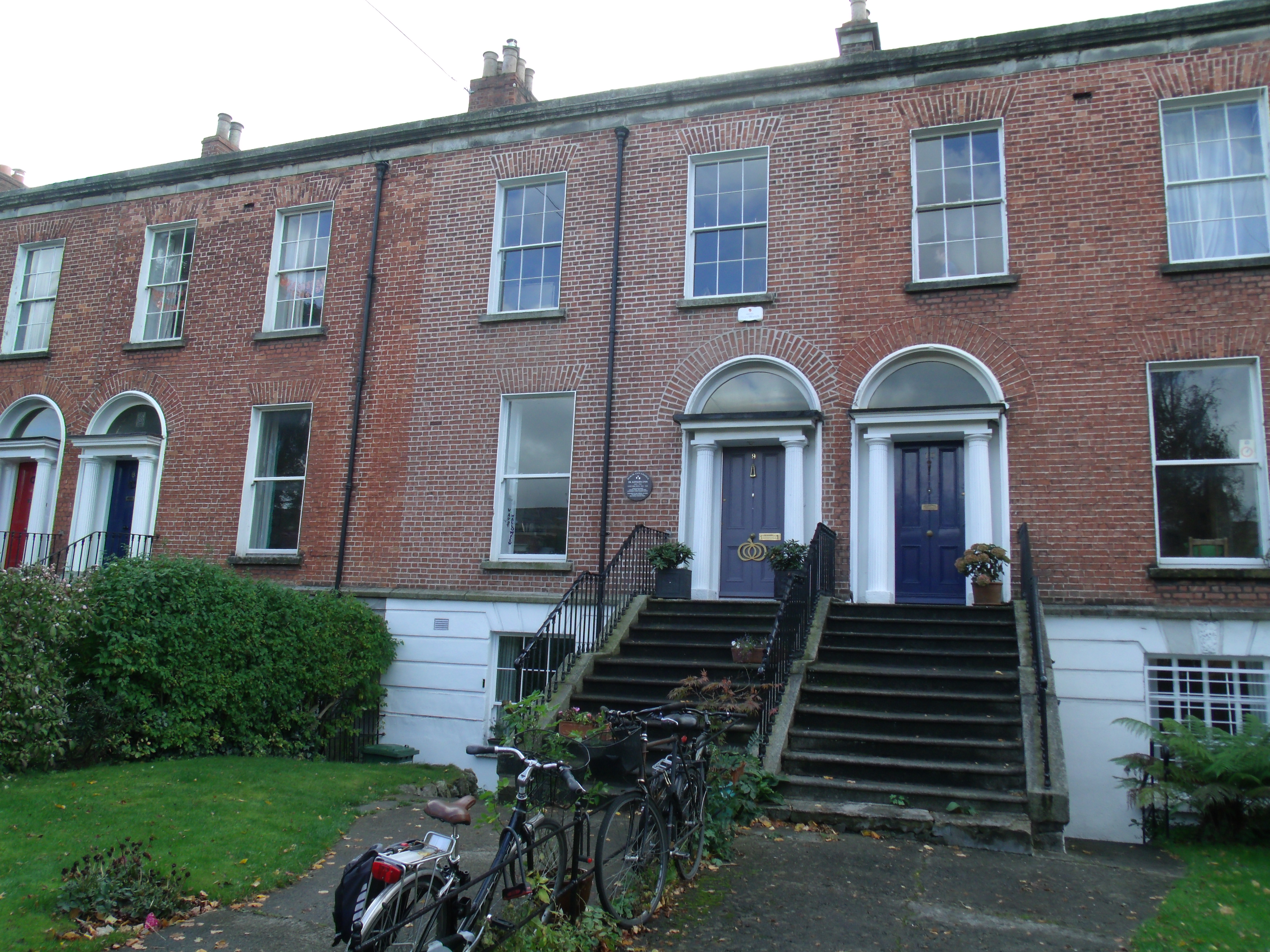
The house shared by Kathleen Lynn and Madeleine ffrench Mullen.

Ffrench-Mullen met Kathleen Lynn through Inghinidhe na h-Éireann. In 1915, she moved into Lynn's home in Belgrave Road, Rathmines, where they lived together for 30 years, until ffrench-Mullen's death in 1944.

Ffrench-Mullen recorded in her prison diary in 1916 that she could face prison without fear once Lynn (whom she referred to as "the Doctor") and she were together. Katherine Lynch of the Women's Studies Centre at University College Dublin describes them as partners, calling them part of a network of lesbians living in Dublin—which included Helena Molony, Louie Bennett and Elizabeth O'Farrell—who met through the suffrage movement and later became involved with the national and trade union movement. These women were featured, along with Eva Gore-Booth and others, in a 2023 TG4 documentary about "the radical queer women at the very heart of the Irish Revolution": Croíthe Radacacha (Radical Hearts).

== Legacy: St Ultan's ==
Madeleine ffrench-Mullen and Kathleen Lynn established Saint Ultan's Children's Hospital, also known as Teach Ultan, which was a female-run hospital for infants at 37 Charlemont Street, Dublin in 1919. The hospital focused on children's health and wellbeing, an area that was perceived at the time as women's concern. In the aftermath of WW1 many health problems had arisen including a rise in venereal diseases such as syphilis, carried from soldiers returning home from war. Many of Ireland's infants of the time suffered from congenital syphilis (inherited disease from mother at birth), and this was a driving factor in the opening of St Ultan's hospital. Tuberculosis was endemic in Ireland during its time as a British colony. Against steadfast opposition by the State and the Catholic Church, Lynn and ffrench Mullen established a vaccination project, vaccinating thousands of impoverished children who would have died of TB without their vaccines. Their success led to the foundation of Ireland's BCG programme, which has vaccinated all babies since the 1950s.

== Death ==
Madeleine ffrench-Mullen died in a Dublin nursing home on 26 May 1944, aged 63. She is interred with her parents, St Lawrence (1846–1895) and Margaret (1857–1912), as well as her younger brothers (whom she outlived), St Lawrence Patrick Joseph (1890–1891) and Douglas (1893–1943), in the ffrench-Mullen family plot in Glasnevin Cemetery.

Her funeral took place on the same day as the 1944 general election.
