= Donal Walsh (activist) =

Irish activist (1996–2013)

- Walsh with a Local Hero award
- Born: 15 June 1996; County Kerry, Ireland
- Died: 12 May 2013 (aged 16); Blennerville, County Kerry, Ireland
- Cause of death: Bone cancer
- Education: CBS Tralee
- Occupations: Student, anti-suicide and cancer awareness activist
- Website: http://donalwalshlivelife.org/

Donal Walsh (15 June 1996 – 12 May 2013) was an Irish cancer awareness and anti-suicide activist from Blennerville, County Kerry. Described by the Irish Independent as "a teenager who inspired a nation", Walsh was diagnosed with osteosarcoma at the age of twelve. He became well known for his activism against teenage suicide after appearing on an interview on RTÉ's Saturday Night Show. He died in 2013 at the age of 16, with thousands paying tribute to him after his death.

== Early life ==
The son of Fionnbar and Elma Walsh, Donal Walsh was born in County Kerry on 15 June 1996. He had a sister, Jemma.

He attended Spa National School and CBS The Green, Tralee. He played rugby with Tralee Rugby Club. A passionate sports fan, Walsh had plans to become a sports journalist.

== Cancer diagnosis and activism ==
In 2009, Walsh was diagnosed with osteosarcoma after a tumour was found in his leg. He underwent chemotherapy for this, but it eventually spread to his lung and became terminal. While undergoing treatment in Crumlin Children's Hospital, Walsh raised over €50,000 to improve conditions in the hospital.

Walsh, a rugby fan all his life, received support from former Munster Rugby player Paul O'Connell during his battle with cancer, with the pair having become friends shortly after Walsh's initial diagnosis.

Walsh became well-known in Ireland following an interview with Brendan O'Connor on his Saturday Night Show. In this interview, Walsh expressed his anger at the prevalence of teenage suicide, saying "I hear of young people committing suicide and I’m sorry but it makes me feel nothing but anger."

== Death and legacy ==
Walsh died on 12 May 2013, at his home in Blennerville, surrounded by his family. In the aftermath of his death, thousands paid tribute to him on social media. Minister of State Kathleen Lynch paid tribute to Walsh, describing him as "extraordinary" and commending his articulate nature and maturity. Thousands attended his funeral, including members of the Kerry gaelic football team and his sporting hero Ronan O'Gara.

The coroner for County Kerry, Terence Casey, noted that in the aftermath of Walsh's appeals to young people, suicide rates had dropped considerably in Kerry, a county which had suffered high rates of suicide in the previous years. Youth resource website SpunOut.ie reported that in the aftermath of Walsh's death, traffic to the site of young people seeking assistance with suicidal thoughts had increased significantly.

Walsh was posthumously honoured by the National Newspapers of Ireland for "outstanding contributions to public debate" in 2013. He also received the Rehab Young Person of the Year award after his death.

In October 2013, the HSE released a video appeal from Walsh, aimed at 15 to 19 year olds and appealing against suicide. The video was distributed to schools as part of an anti-suicide campaign. On New Year's Day in 2014, a documentary on Walsh's life aired on RTÉ, titled Donal Walsh - My Life.

Walsh's parents set up the Donal Walsh Live Life Foundation to honour his legacy and continue campaigning against teenage suicide. The foundation was honoured by Kerry County Council in 2019, having raised over €500,000 for charitable causes and organised visits to schools. In 2023, thousands gathered at Knock on the tenth anniversary of Walsh's death to celebrate Donal Walsh Day.
