= Blennerville Windmill =

Windmill in Blennerville, Ireland

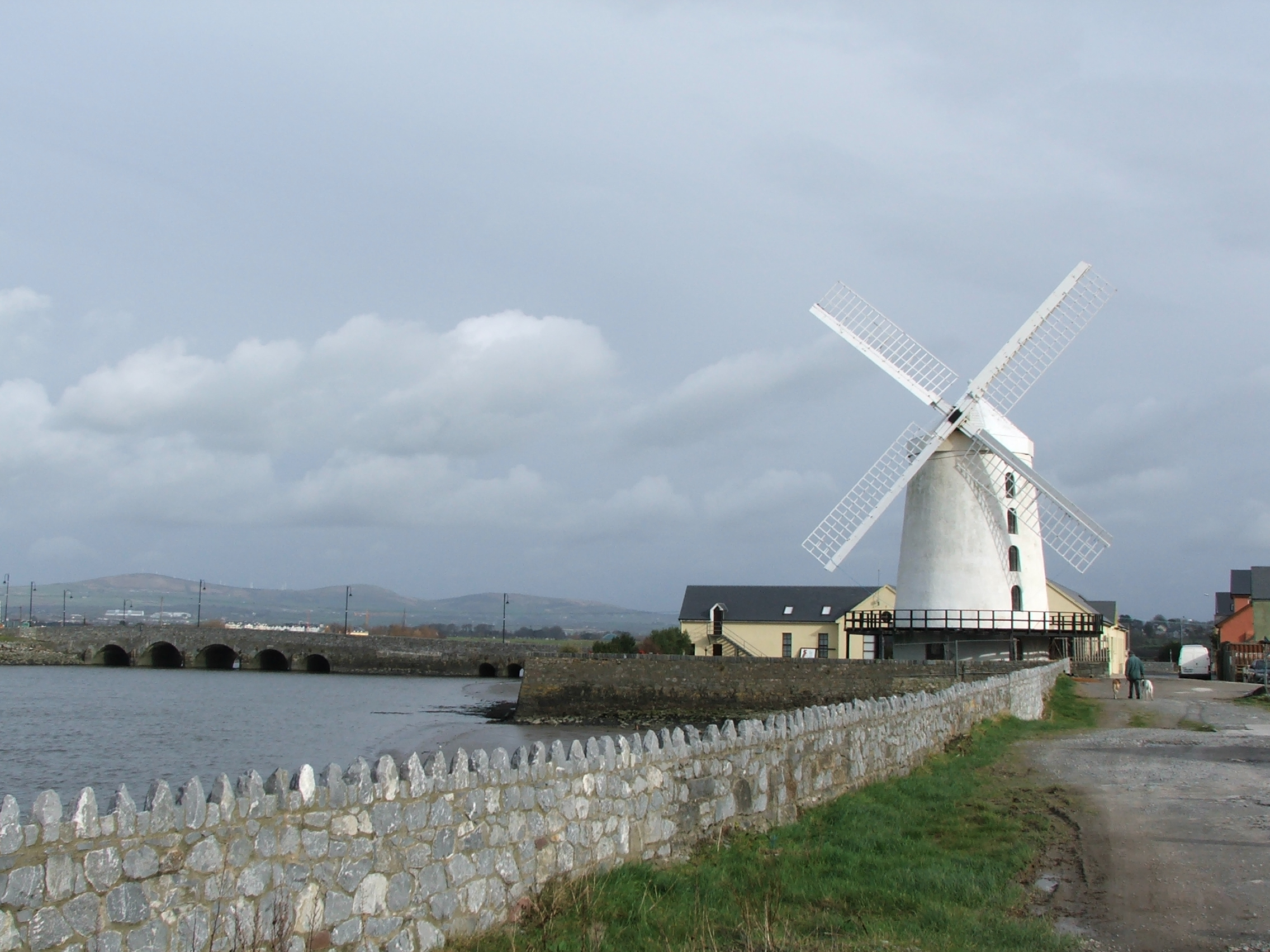
- Blennerville Windmill

Origin
- Mill location: Blennerville, County Kerry
- Coordinates: 52.2567°N 9.7374°W
- Year built: 1800

Information
- Purpose: Corn mill
- Type: Tower mill
- Storeys: Five storeys
- No. of sails: Four
- Type of sails: Common sails

The Blennerville Windmill is a 21.30 m high, stone, reefing stage, windmill in Blennerville, County Kerry, Ireland. The mill has five floors, ground floor, intermediate floor, grinding floor, stone floor and cap floor.

== History ==
The mill was built in 1800 by order of Sir Rowland Blennerhassett and has two grinding couples with on the spindle a gear that is driven by the wheel with wooden combs. The grinding stones are French bir. The mill was used for milling grain, both for local people and for export to Great Britain. At the end of the 19th century, the mill began to decay due to the rise of the steam engine, the salinisation of the river channel to Blennerville, the opening of the Tralee Ship Canal in 1846 and the construction of the Fenit harbour in 1880. In 1981 Tralee Urban District Council bought the mill and began the restoration of the mill in June 1984. The restored mill was officially opened in 1990 by Taoiseach (Prime Minister) Charles Haughey. Nowadays again wheat is ground.

== Specifications ==
The wooden windshaft has a one-ton stock housing cast.

The mill has wings of 18.29 meters (60 feet) with wooden breast rods.

The crown wheel has conical toothing with iron teeth.

The wooden brake utilises friction to keep the mill stationary.

The winding mechanism is operated outside the mill with a jug chain over a sprocket. The small transmission makes the crossing very slow, 180 degrees of cross takes about two hours.

The sack hoist has a conical wheel, which is driven under the crown wheel.

On the now empty intermediate floor is tentering of the main shaft of douglas fir with an iron construction, which used to have a motor. Also here are the tentering of the grinding couples and the great spur wheel.

There is also a visitor centre with a craft centre, model railways, art gallery, audio-visual presentation and restaurant.

Guided tours with a guide are given in the mill. The Blennerville Windmill is now the only commercial windmill in Ireland.

== Gallery ==
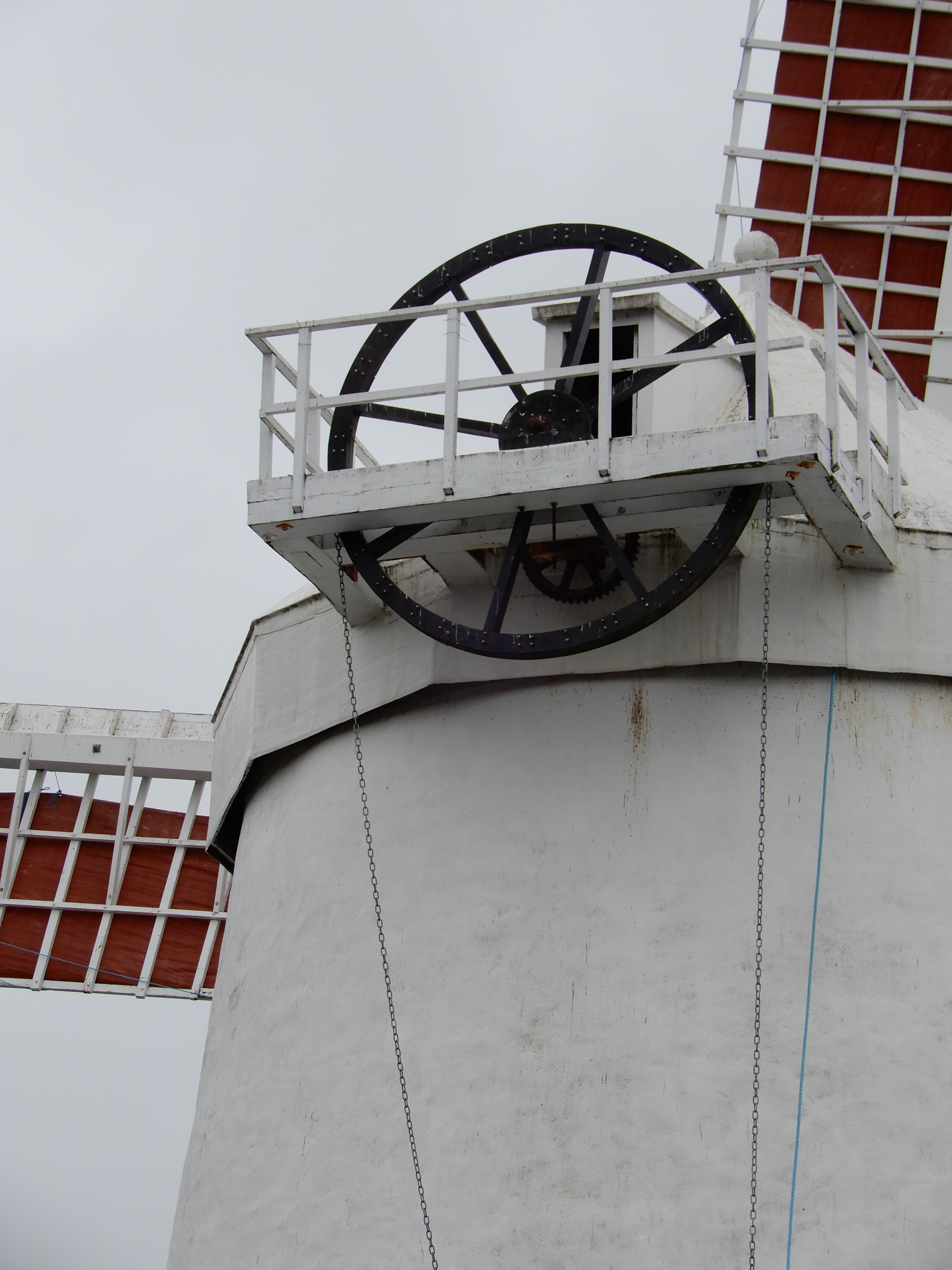
Winding mechanism

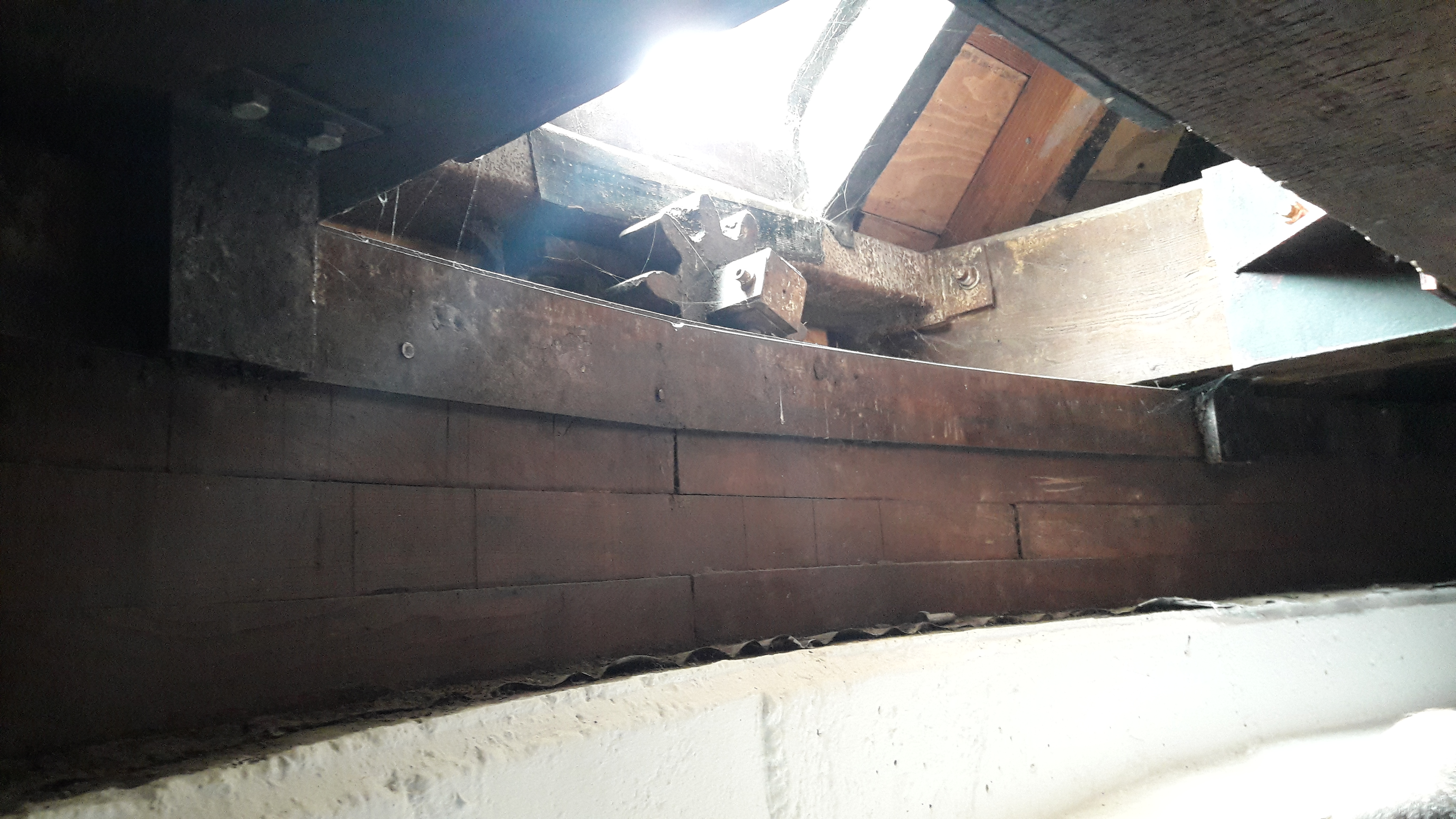
Winding pully

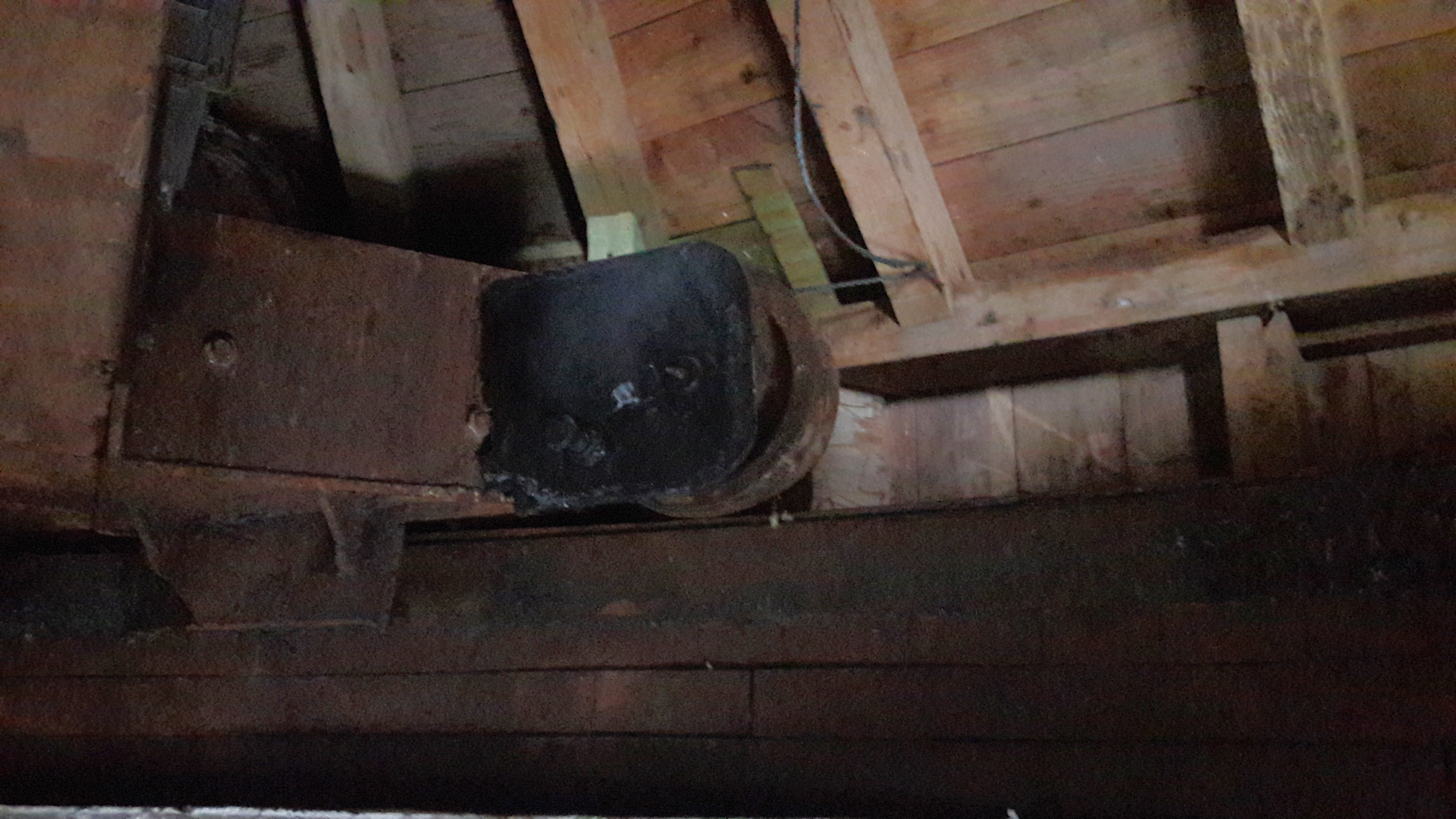
Winding mechanism

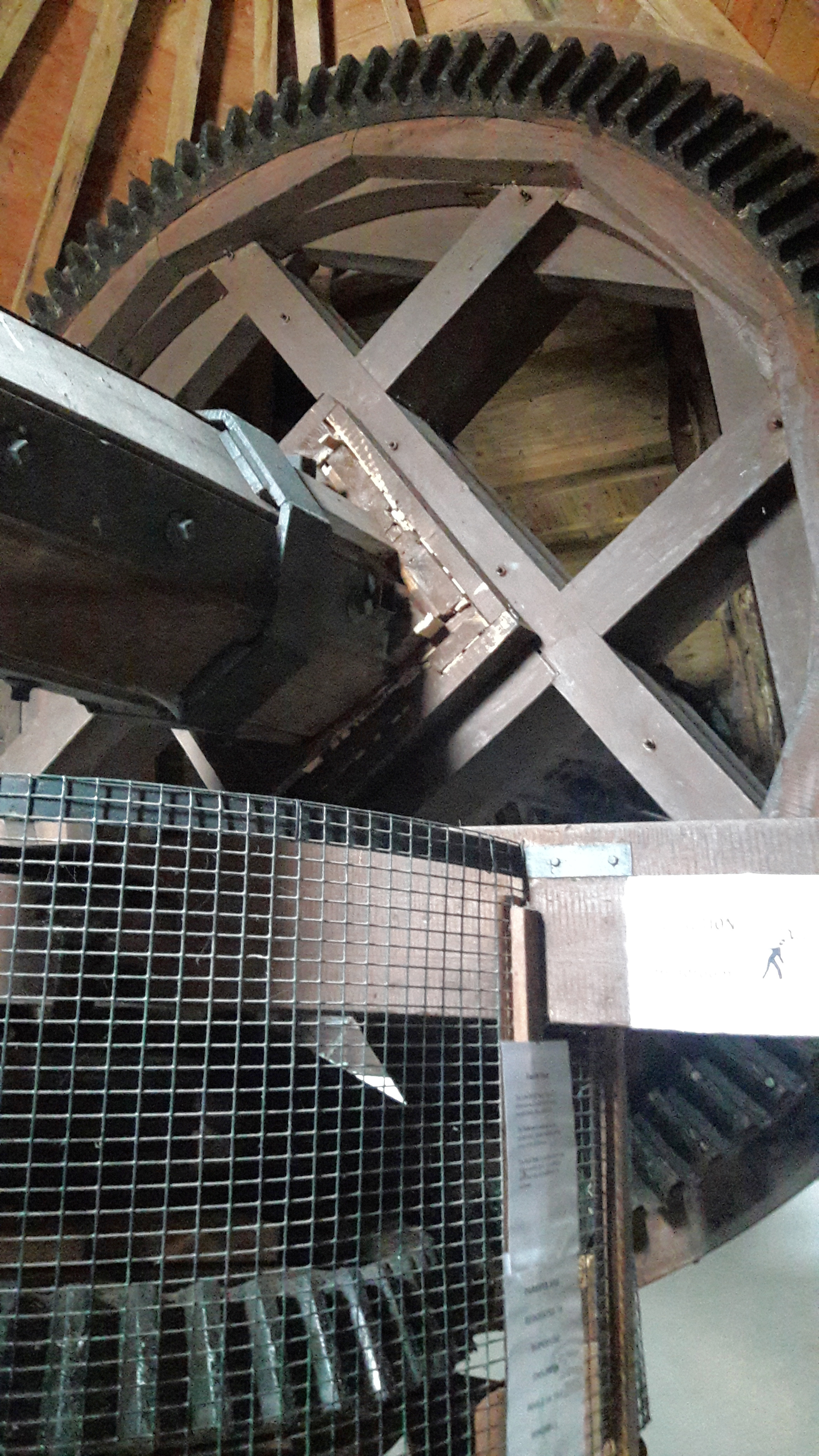
Windshaft and cog wheel

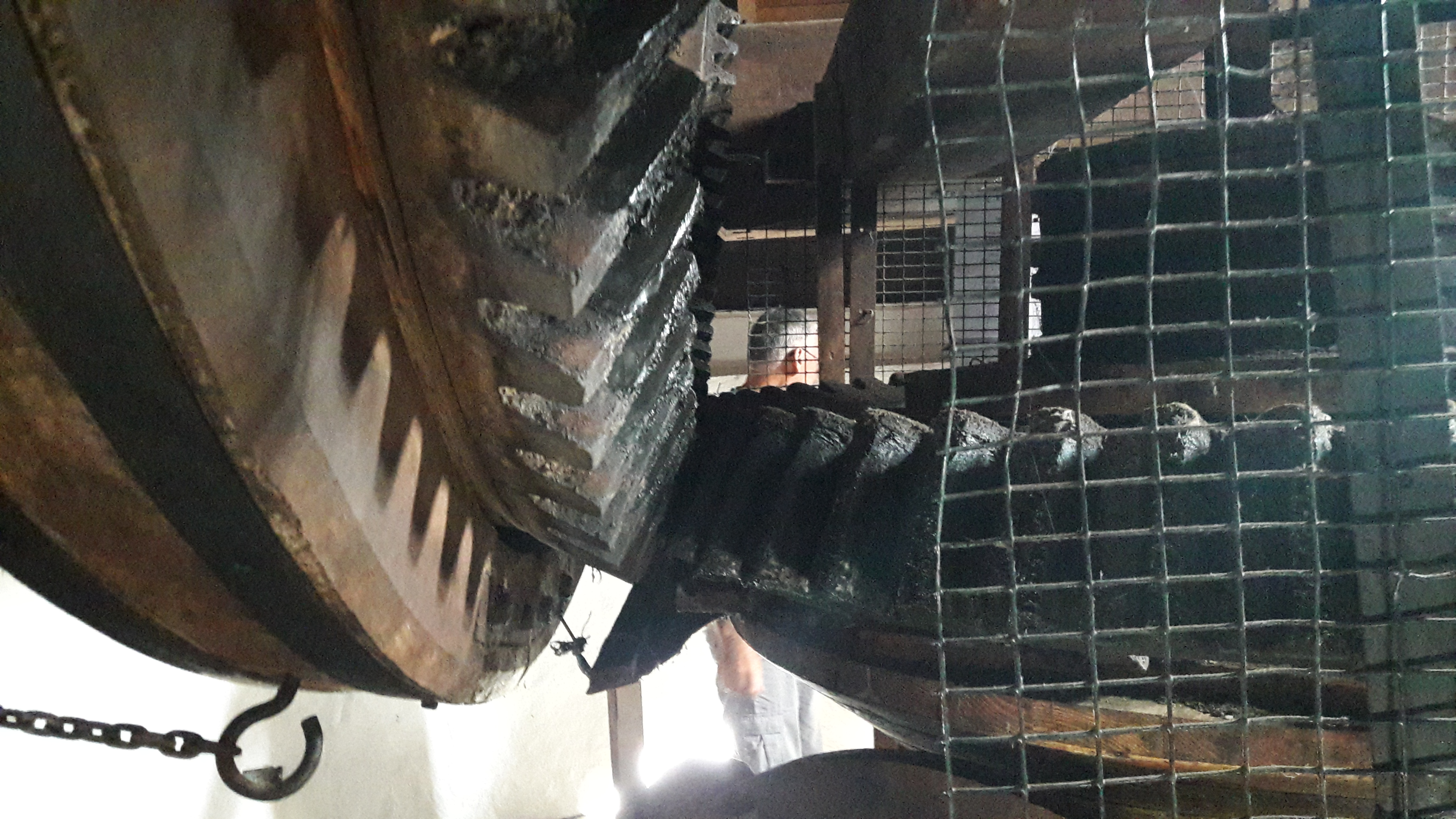
Cog wheels

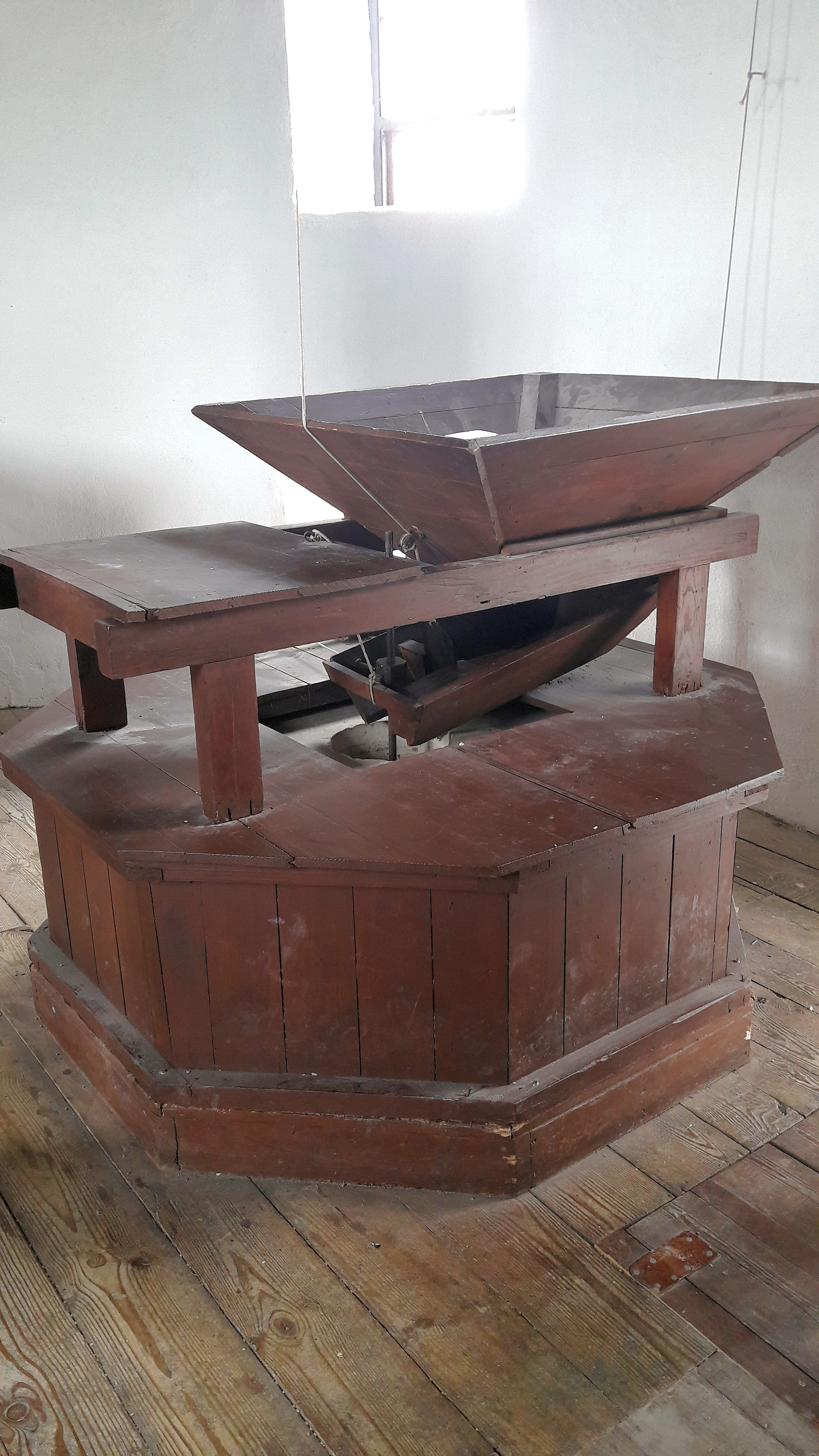
Grinding equipment

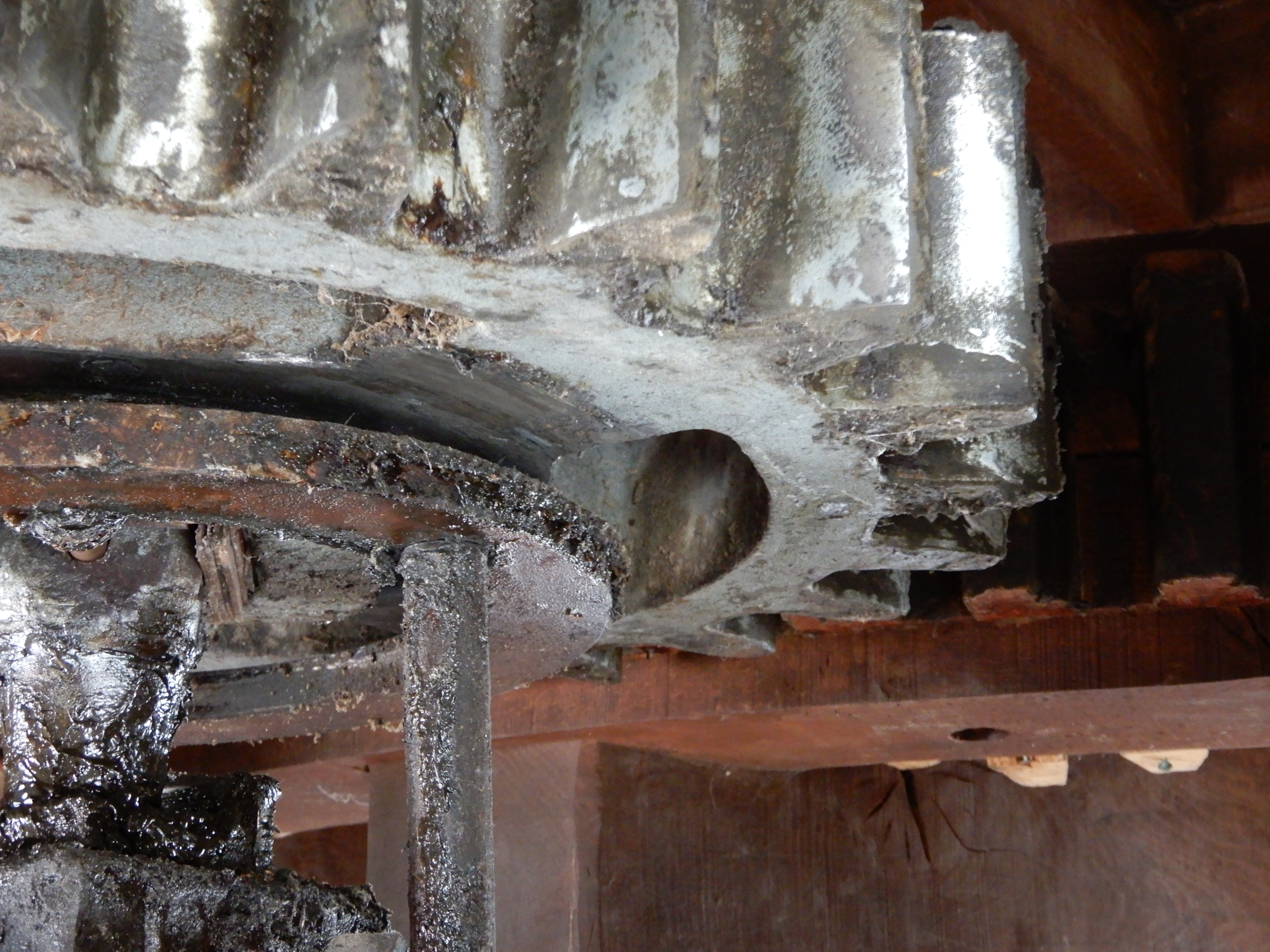
Footstep bearing and stone nut at spindle

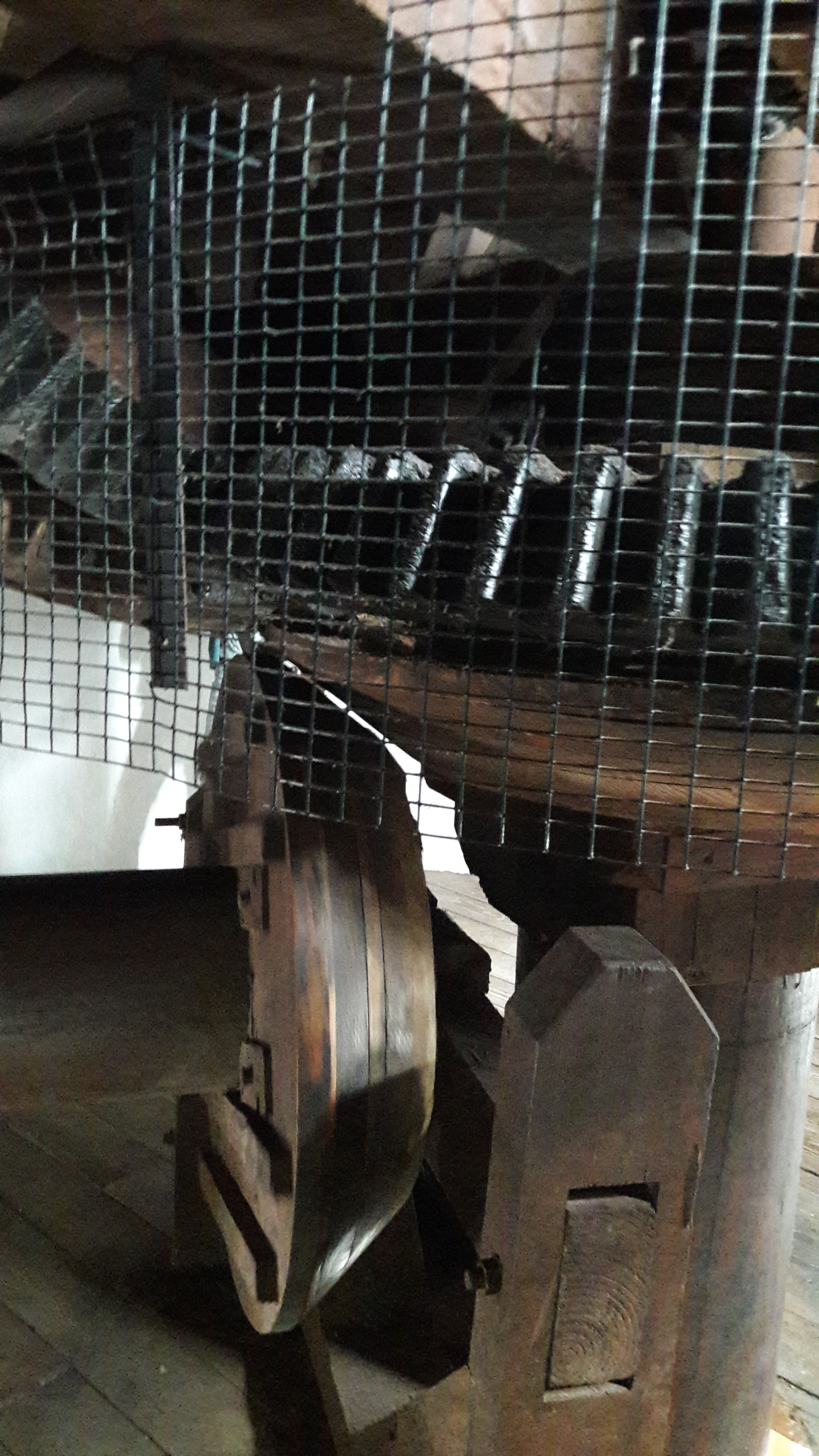
Wooden pulley

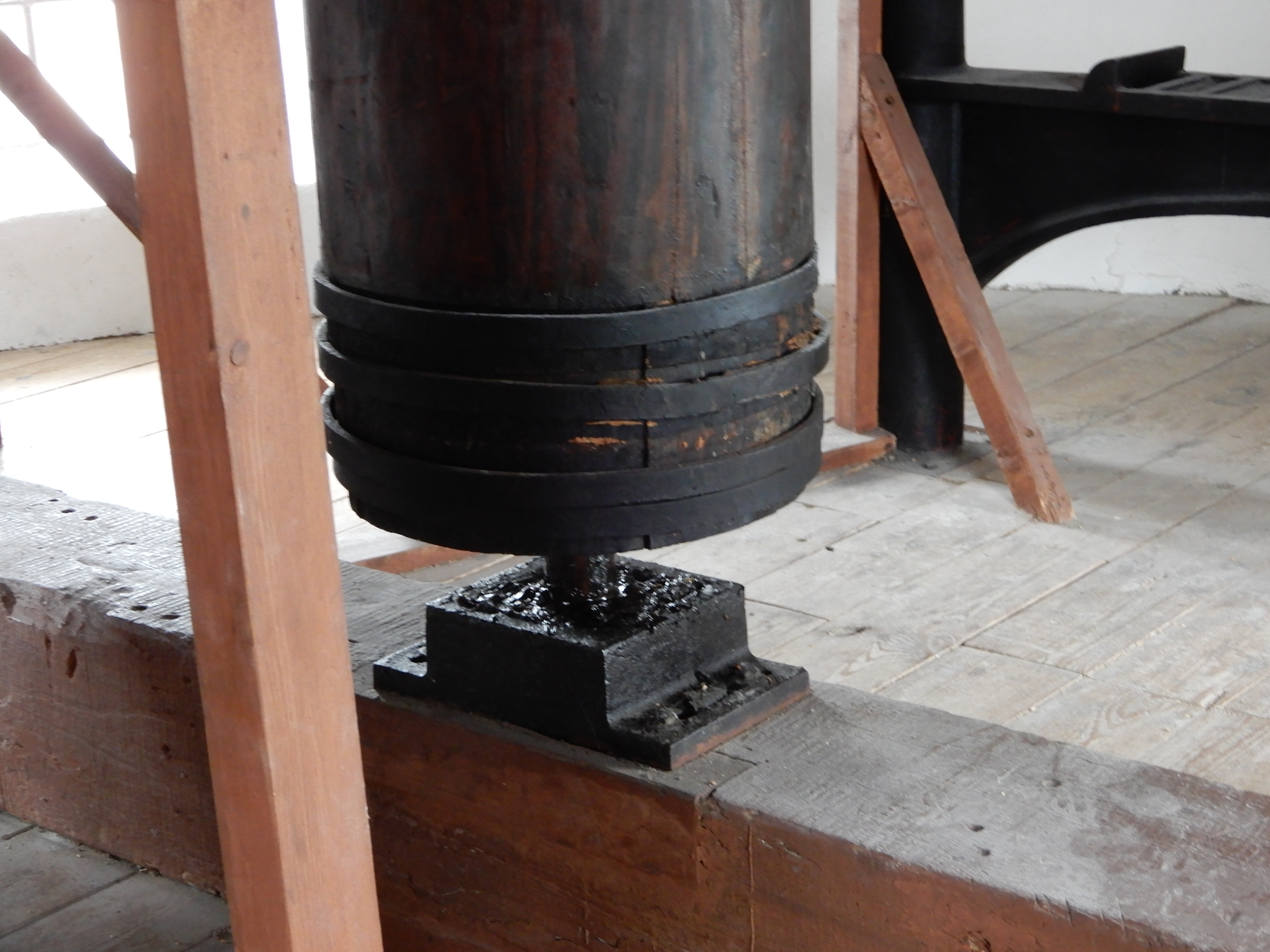
Footstep bearing main shaft

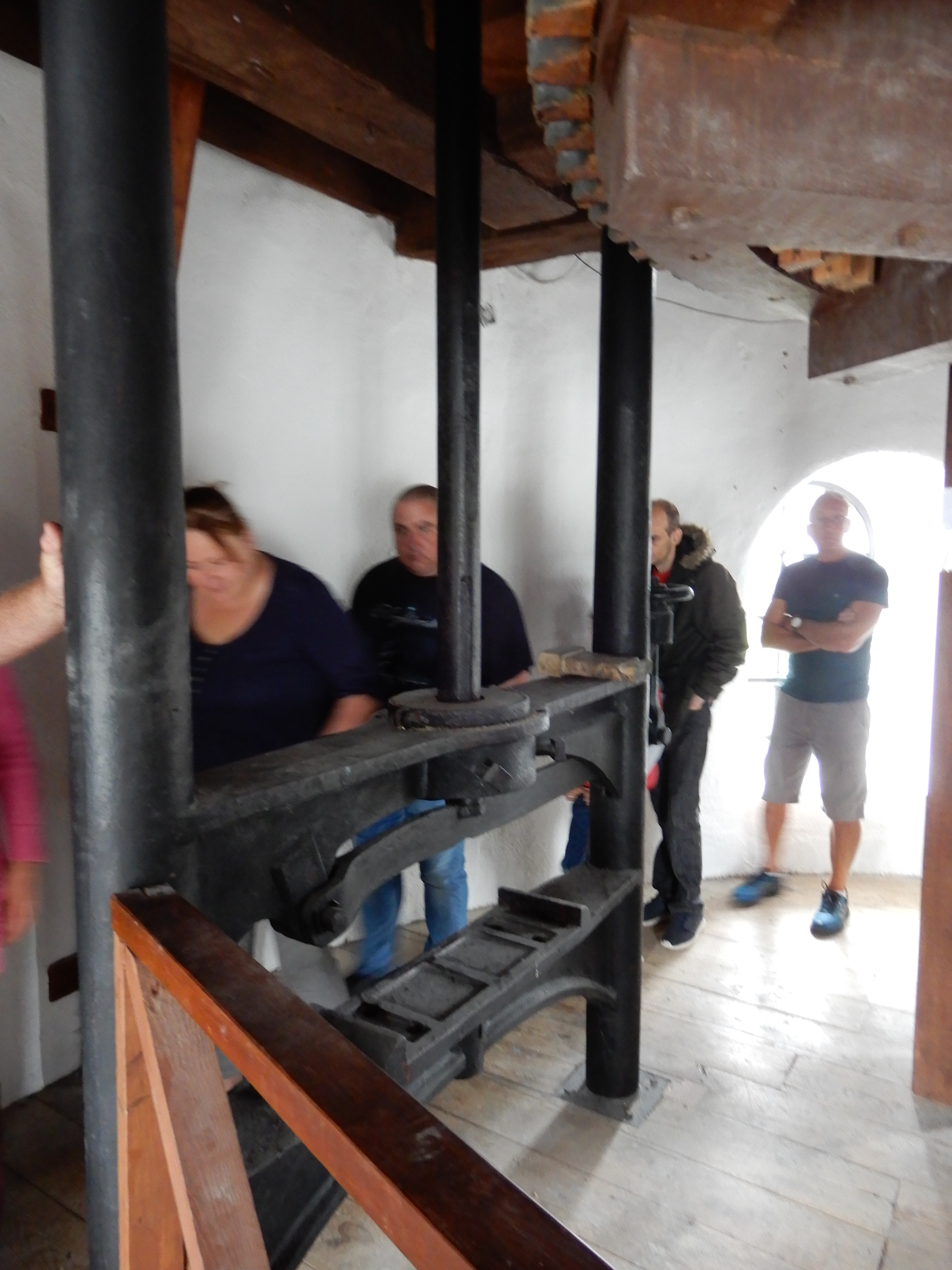
Standard for former motor and a tip of the great spurwheel
