= Graham O'Connell =

Irish Gaelic footballer

Personal information
- Born: 1987 (age 38–39) Tralee, County Kerry, Ireland
- Occupation: Garda

Sport
- Sport: Gaelic football
- Position: Corner forward
Club
- Years: Club
- 2005-2011: Austin Stacks Monaleen
Inter-county
Years	County	Apps (scores)
2012	Limerick	(0-0)
Inter-county titles
- Munster titles: 0
- All-Irelands: 0
- All Stars: 0

Graham O'Connell (born 1987) is an Irish Gaelic footballer. He played with the Austin Stacks club of Tralee before joining Limerick side Monaleen and is a member of the Limerick county squad. He played underage with Kerry and was part of the 2008 All-Ireland winning U-21 panel.
