= Tralee Ship Canal =

Canal in Ireland

Tralee Ship Canal Longchanáil Thrá Lí
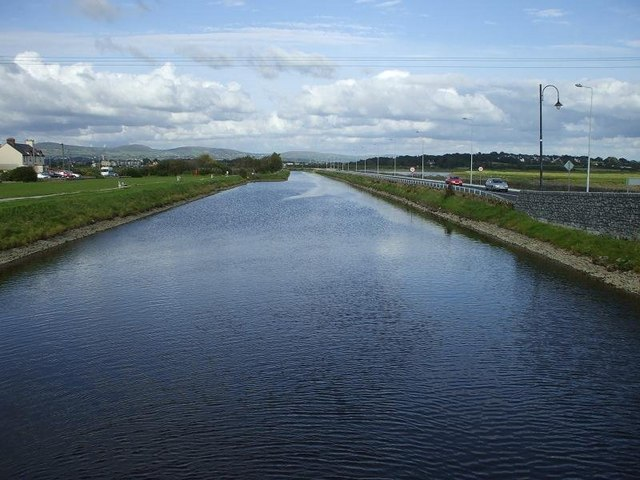
- Tralee Ship Canal from the swing bridge at Blennerville, County Kerry
- Interactive map of Tralee Ship Canal; Longchanáil Thrá Lí
- Coordinates: 52.2584°N 9.7355°W

Specifications
- Length: 3.2 km (2.0 miles)
- Locks: 1
- Status: Open
- Navigation authority: Unknown

History
- Construction began: 1832
- Date completed: 1846
- Date closed: 1951
- Date restored: 1999

Geography
- Start point: Tralee
- End point: Blennerville
- Connects to: Tralee Bay

The Tralee Ship Canal (Irish: Longchanáil Thrá Lí) is a canal built for freight and passenger transportation from Tralee Bay to the town of Tralee in County Kerry, Ireland. The canal fell into disuse in the mid-20th century but has since been restored.

== History ==
Tralee Harbour Act 1828
- Act of Parliament
- Parliament of the United Kingdom
- Long title: An Act for making and maintaining a Navigable Cut or Canal from a Point at or near the Blackrock in the Harbour of Tralee, in the County of Kerry, to Croompanrikard, near the Town of Tralee, in the said County; and for otherwise improving the said Harbour of Tralee.
- Citation: 9 Geo. 4. c. cxviii
- Territorial extent: United Kingdom

Dates
- Royal assent: 15 July 1828
- Commencement: 15 July 1828 (Note: The Acts of Parliament (Commencement) Act 1793.)
Other legislation
Amended by	Tralee Navigation and Harbour Act 1836; Tralee Navigation Act 1841

Status: Amended

Text of statute as originally enacted

Tralee Navigation and Harbour Act 1836
- Act of Parliament
- Parliament of the United Kingdom
- Long title: An Act to extend the Time limited by an Act passed in the Ninth Year of the Reign of His late Majesty King George the Fourth, for improving the Navigation and Harbour of Tralee in the County of Kerry.
- Citation: 6 & 7 Will. 4. c. cxiv
- Territorial extent: United Kingdom

Dates
- Royal assent: 4 July 1836
- Commencement: 4 July 1836
Other legislation
Amends	Tralee Harbour Act 1828
Amended by	Tralee Navigation Act 1841
Relates to	Tralee Canal Act 1864

Status: Current legislation

Text of statute as originally enacted

Tralee Navigation Act 1841
- Act of Parliament
- Parliament of the United Kingdom
- Long title: An Act to empower the Commissioners for the Issue of Exchequer Bills for public Works to complete the Works authorized to be made by an Act of the Sixth and Seventh Years of His late Majesty King William the Fourth, for improving the Navigation and Harbour of Tralee in the County of Kerry; and to extend the Time for that Purpose.
- Citation: 4 & 5 Vict. c. 46
- Territorial extent: United Kingdom

Dates
- Royal assent: 21 June 1841
- Commencement: 21 June 1841
Other legislation
Amends	Tralee Harbour Act 1828; Tralee Navigation and Harbour Act 1836
Amended by	Tralee Navigation and Harbour Act 1844

Status: Amended

Text of statute as originally enacted

Tralee Navigation and Harbour Act 1844
- Act of Parliament
- Parliament of the United Kingdom
- Long title: An Act to extend the Time limited by an Act passed in the Fourth and Fifth Years of Her present Majesty, empowering the Commissioners for the Issue of Exchequer Bills for Public Works to complete the Works for improving the Navigation and Harbour of Tralee in the County of Kerry.
- Citation: 7 & 8 Vict. c. 99
- Territorial extent: United Kingdom

Dates
- Royal assent: 9 August 1844
- Commencement: 9 August 1844
Other legislation
Amends	Tralee Navigation Act 1841

Status: Current legislation

Text of statute as originally enacted

Tralee Canal Act 1864
- Act of Parliament
- Parliament of the United Kingdom
- Long title: An Act for empowering the Commissioners of the Harbour of Tralee to raise Money, and for other Purposes.
- Citation: 27 & 28 Vict. c. cxxxi
- Territorial extent: United Kingdom

Dates
- Royal assent: 30 June 1864
- Commencement: 30 June 1864

Status: Current legislation

Text of statute as originally enacted

The Tralee Ship Canal was built to accommodate larger ships sailing into Tralee since the existing quay in Blennerville was becoming unpractical to use due to silting. Merchants in Tralee were not satisfied with its facilities and petitioned the House of Commons to authorise an act of Parliament in June 1829 for the construction of a canal. Work on the canal began in 1832 but issues with funding meant the canal was not completed until 1846 when it was finally opened to ships. The canal was 2 miles (3.2 km) in length with a new canal basin built in Tralee, lock gates and a wooden swing bridge constructed in Blennerville. Large ships of up to 300 tonnes could navigate the canal but not long after the canal opened it too began to suffer from silting. By the 1880s Fenit harbour was built which was a deep water harbour and did not suffer from silting. Soon afterwards a railway was constructed between Fenit and Tralee which allowed for the transport of cargo and freight from ships moored there. Due to continued silting of the canal and the increased use of Fenit the canal fell into disuse and was subsequently closed in 1951.

== Restoration ==
Following the restoration of Blennerville Windmill in the early 1990s it was envisaged that the canal could be restored as a tourist attraction. In 1999 the Office of Public Works (OPW) started a restoration project of the canal at a cost of IR£650,000. It involved the excavation of the basin, a new swing bridge constructed at Blennerville, the lock gates being restored and the canal being dredged of silt. The basin area of the canal was subsequently redeveloped with apartment blocks built as part of a proposed marina while the towpath along the canal was upgraded and is now used by people as an enjoyable amenity as part of the Dingle Way. Tralee Rowing Club use the canal and have a boathouse at the basin.

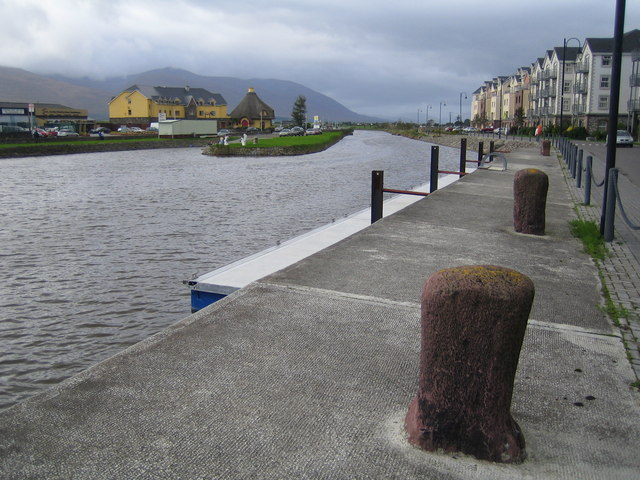
The Basin at the end of the Tralee Ship Canal

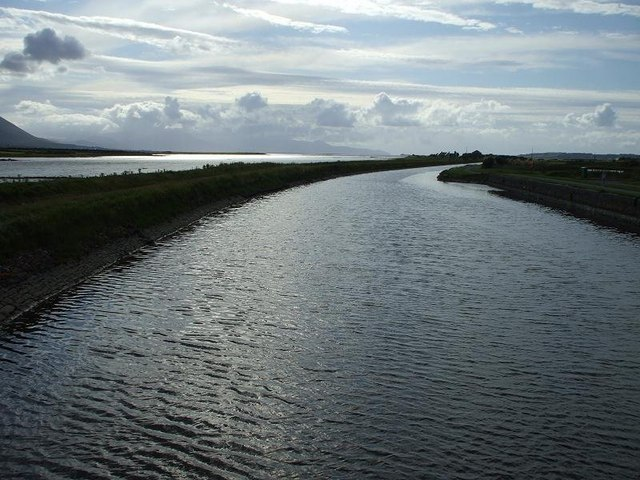
Looking towards Tralee Bay from the swing bridge at Blennerville

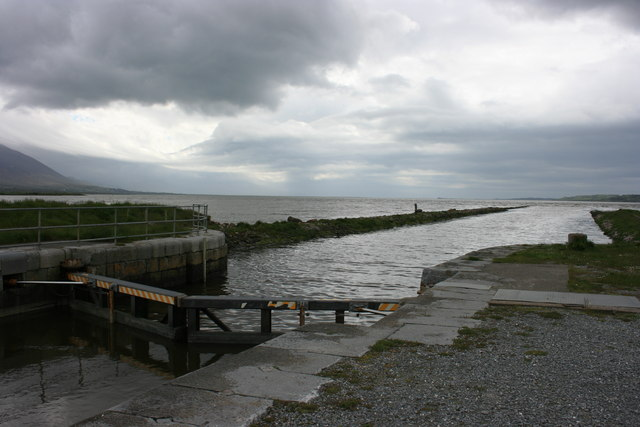
Lock Gate towards Tralee Bay
