= Blennerville =

Village in County Kerry, Ireland

Blennerville Cathair Uí Mhóráin
- Village
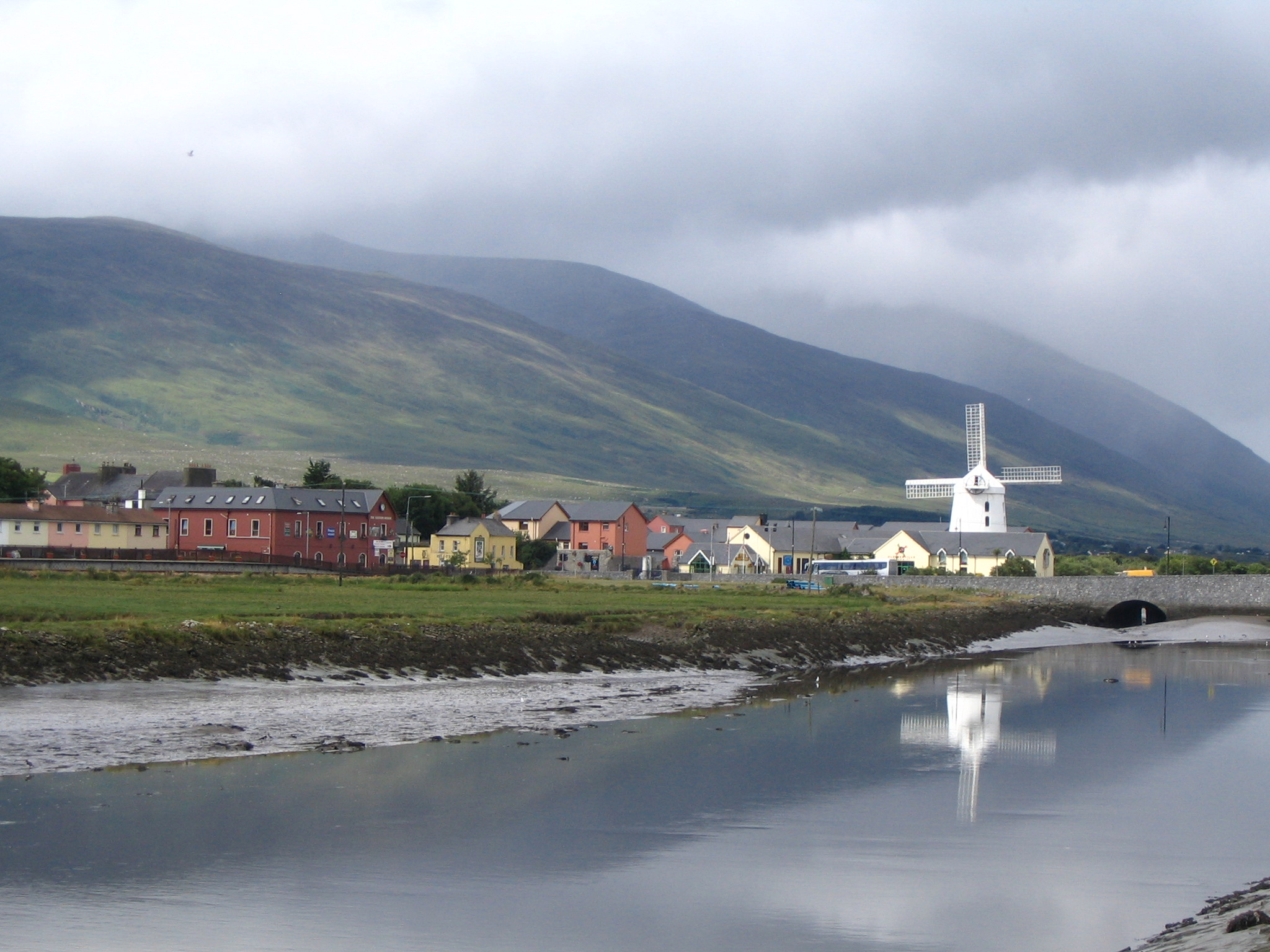

- Location in Ireland
- Coordinates: 52°15′22″N 9°44′10″W
- Country: Ireland
- Province: Munster
- County: County Kerry

Population (2011)
  - Urban: 141
  - Rural: 556
- Time zone: UTC+0 (WET)
  - Summer (DST): UTC-1 (IST (WEST))
- Irish Grid Reference: Q812130

Blennerville (Irish: Cathair Uí Mhóráin, meaning "the seat/home of the Morans") is a small village near Tralee, County Kerry, Ireland. It is approximately 1 mile (1.6 km) west of the town centre on the N86 road to Dingle, where the River Lee enters Tralee Bay. The village was formerly Tralee's port, and is connected to the town centre by the Tralee Ship Canal. Part of Blennerville electoral division falls within the area of Tralee Town Council, and at the 2011 census had a population of 141. The remaining portion, outside the urban boundaries, had a 2011 population of 556.

== History ==
Blennerville was originally called Cathair Uí Mhóráin (anglicised as Cahermoraun or Cahirmoreaun), and it has been speculated that it was the ancient site of the Tramore ford, the only escape route afforded to the 15th Earl of Desmond from Tralee towards the south, before his capture and execution in 1583.

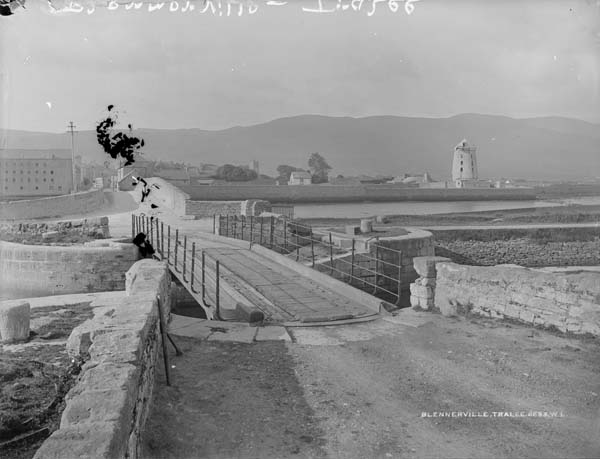
Blennerville in the late 19th century

Whether the old Tramore ford was at the spot where the bridge has been erected, or on the firmer sands further down towards Tralee Spa, is not certain, but the ancient name of Blennerville, (before Sir Rowland Blennerhassett, 1st Baronet made it his residence and elevated it into a village after his name,) being Cahirmoreaun i.e. the cahir on the great river, renders it probable that the passage was there, and that a ferry house or some such place was the nucleus round which the hamlet originally grew.

— A. B. Rowan, The Last Geraldyn Chief of Tralee Castle

A bridge was built at the site in 1751, and in 1783 Sir Rowland Blennerhassett renamed it Blennerville after his family. Blennerville Windmill, Ireland's only commercially operating windmill, was built in 1800. The port at Blennerville was used through most of the 19th century as a gateway from Kerry to North America by emigrants wishing to cross the Atlantic Ocean. The Jeanie Johnston was the most famous of these ships that transported emigrants, and throughout its service no passenger ever died. By 1846, however, the Tralee Ship Canal was opened, replacing Blennerville as Tralee's port and the village went into decline with the windmill falling into ruins and closing by the mid-19th century.

In 1891 the Tralee and Dingle Light Railway opened connecting Tralee with Dingle along one of Europe's most western railway lines at the time. A station operated at Blennerville until the line closed in 1953. Blennerville National School was built in 1932, and according to its website has an enrolment of 168 students.

== Recent times ==
In 1981 Blennerville Windmill was purchased by Tralee Urban District Council; restoration work began in June 1984 before the windmill was opened to the public by the Taoiseach Charles Haughey in 1990. It is now impressively restored and open to the public with a visitor centre comprising a craft centre, exhibition gallery, audio-visual presentation and restaurant.

A restoration project of the Tralee and Dingle Light Railway was undertaken in 1993 with a short 3-kilometre (1.9 mi) replica of the original line opened between the Aquadome in Tralee to the restored station at Blennerville. As of 2014 the railway is no longer in operation. Blennerville Bridge was strengthened and enlarged in 1996.

In the late 1980s an idea was conceived of building a replica of the Jeanie Johnston ship that sailed from Blennerville to North America during the 19th century. It did not become a reality until November 1993 when a feasibility study was completed, and in May 1995 The Jeanie Johnston (Ireland) Company Ltd. was incorporated. The Jeanie Johnston was constructed in a shipyard located only metres from where she sailed from Blennerville's original port. It was originally planned to launch the ship from her shipyard in Blennerville, but a 19th-century shipwreck was discovered by marine archaeologists while a channel was being dredged. To preserve the find, on 19 April 2000 the hull of the Jeanie Johnston was hauled to the shore and loaded onto a shallow-draft barge. There she was fitted with masts and sails, and on 4 May was transported to Fenit, a short distance away. On 6 May the barge was submerged and the Jeanie Johnston took to the water for the first time. The next day she was officially christened by President of Ireland Mary McAleese. Today the Jeanie Johnston is owned by the Dublin Docklands Development Authority and is located in Dublin.

After a 20-year battle Blennerville finally got a new school, the old building been demolished after 84 years.

== Sport ==
Blennerville has a GAA club called St Patrick's, Blennerville. The club was founded in 1929. Emigration took its toll on the team and it ceased to operate on a competitive level. The team dissolved in 1957, but reformed in 1963.

== Notable people ==
- Richard Johnson, judge.
- Michael O' Regan, journalist.
- Paschal Sheehy, journalist.
- Donal Walsh, anti-suicide activist

== See also ==
- List of towns and villages in the Republic of Ireland
- List of windmills in Ireland
- Trughanacmy
