= Tralee =

Town in County Kerry, Ireland

Tralee Trá Lí (Irish)
- Town
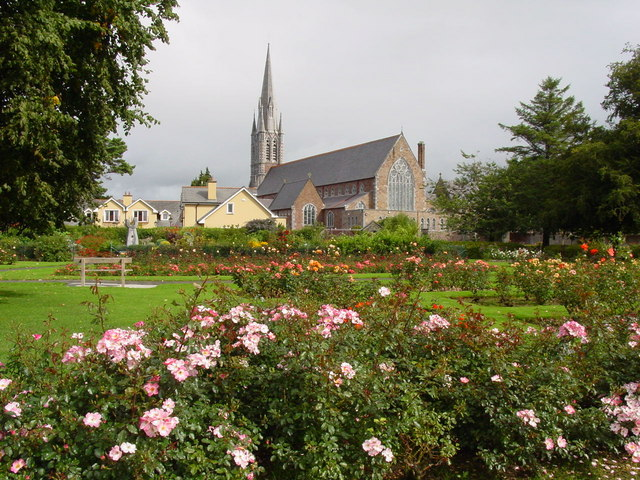
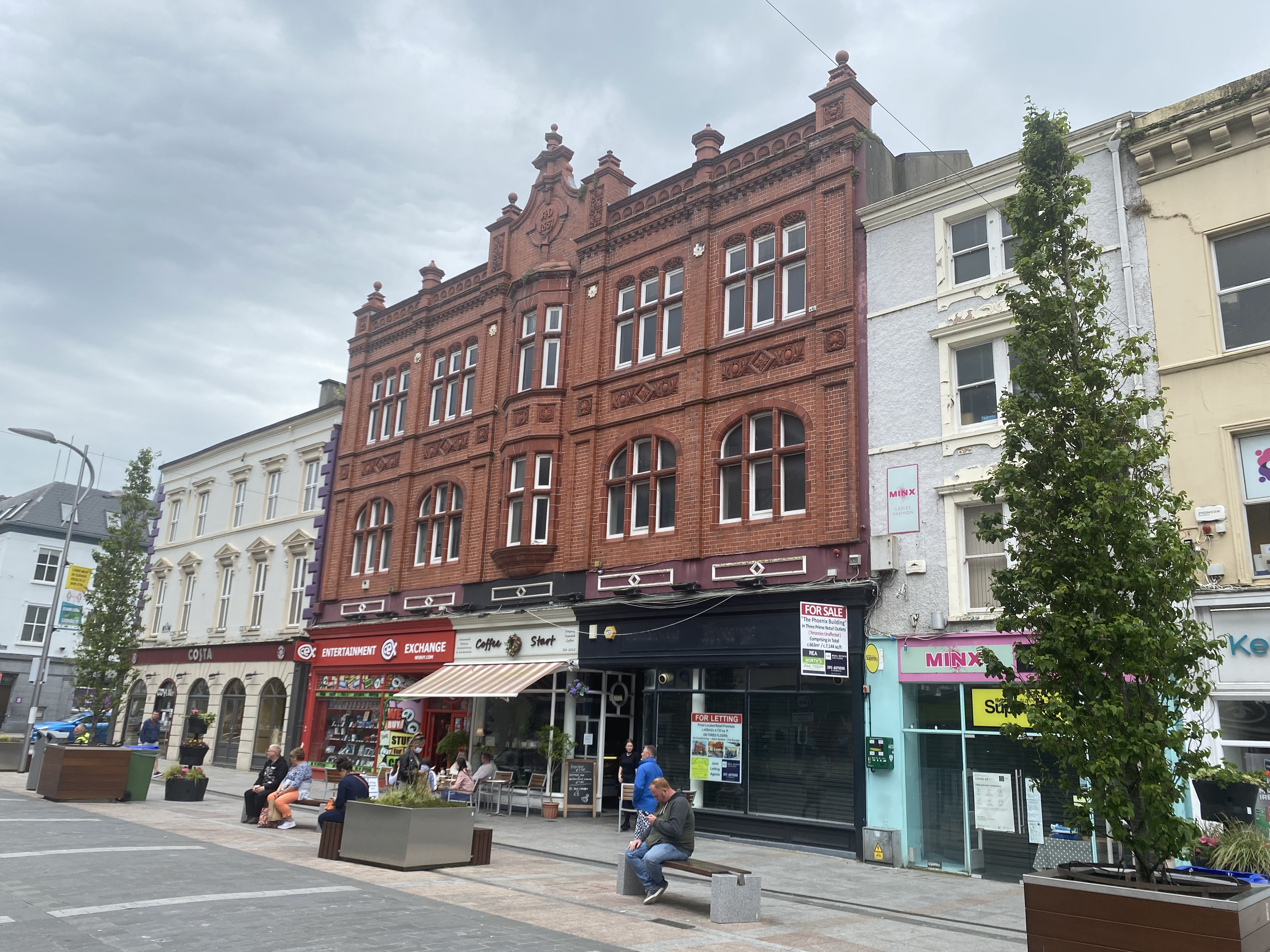
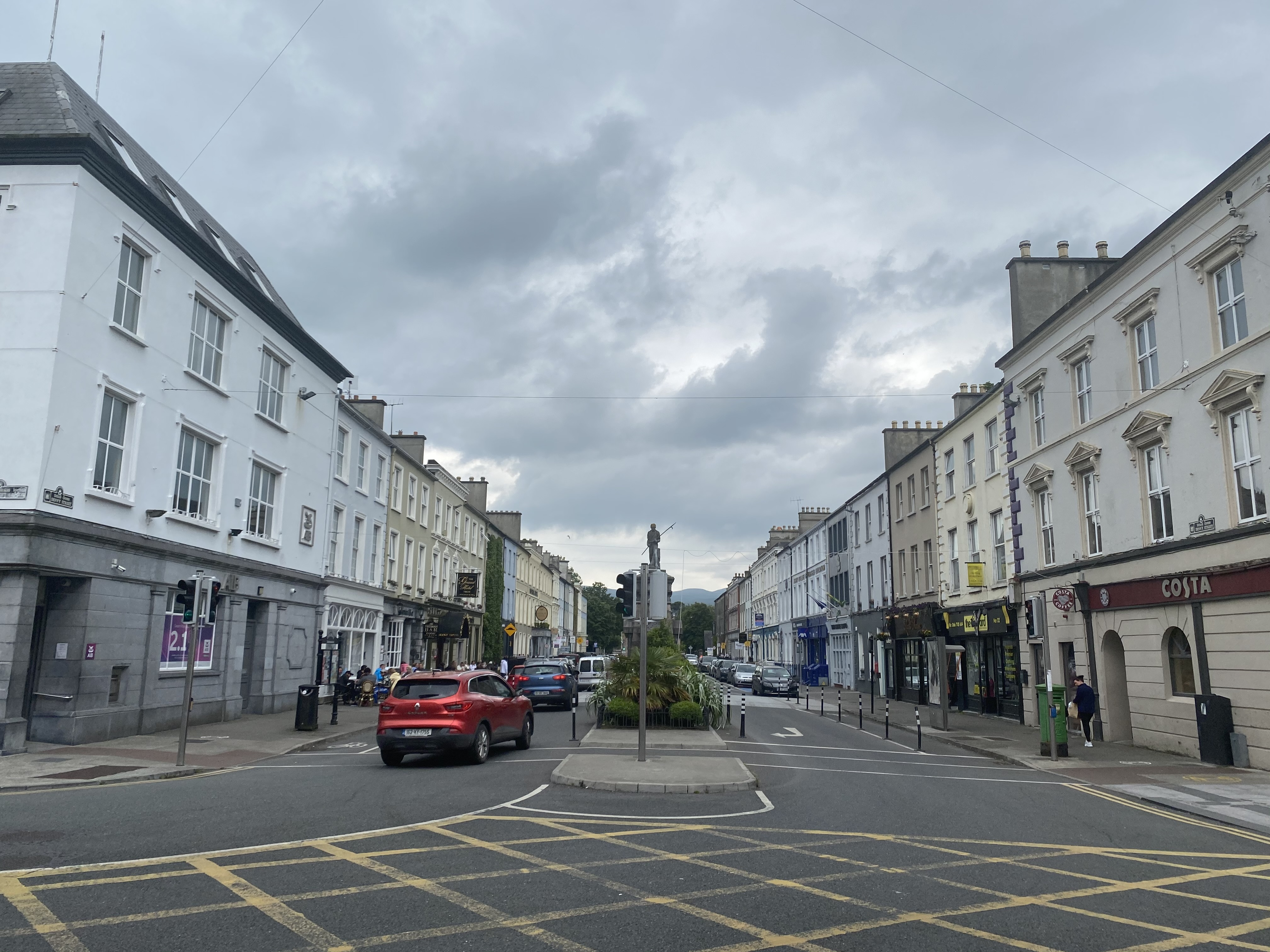
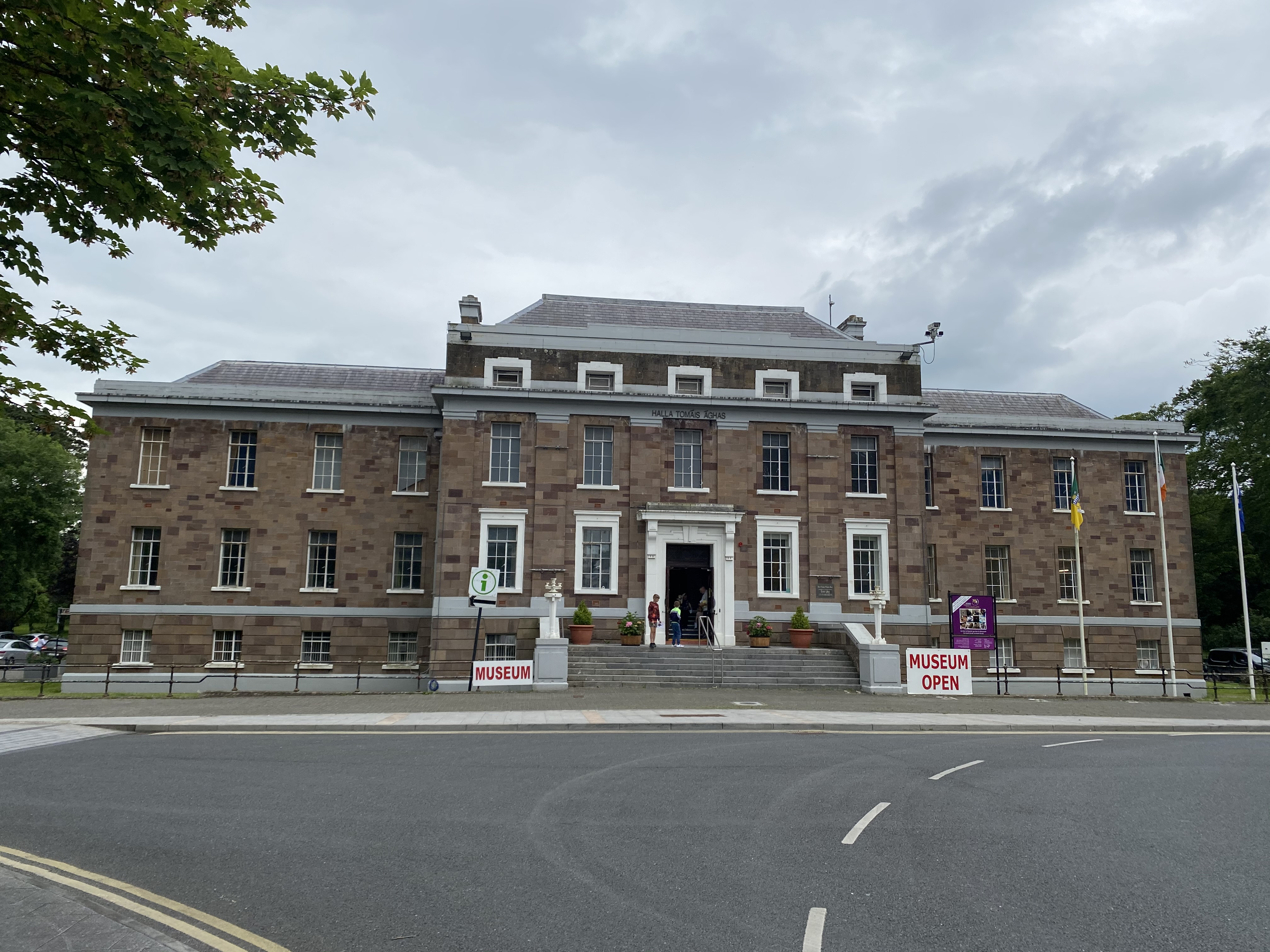
- Town park The Mall Denny Street Kerry County Museum

- Coat of arms
- Motto: Vis Unita Fortior (Latin) "United Strength is Stronger"
- Location in Ireland Tralee (Europe)
- Coordinates: 52.2675°N 9.6962°W
- Country: Ireland
- Province: Munster
- County: Kerry

Government
  - Council: Kerry County Council
  - Dáil constituency: Kerry
  - European Parliament: South
- Elevation: 37 m (121 ft)

Population (2022)
  - Total: 26,079
  - Rank: 15th
  - Density: 739.2/km^{2} (1,915/sq mi)
- Time zone: UTC±0 (WET)
  - Summer (DST): UTC+1 (IST)
- Eircode routing key: V92
- Telephone area code: +353(0)66
- Irish Grid Reference: Q828141
- Website: tralee.ie

Tralee (/trəˈliː/ trə-LEE; Irish: Trá Lí, pronounced [t̪ˠɾˠaː(j) ˈl̠ʲiː]; formerly Tráigh Lí, meaning 'strand [of the River] Lee') is the county town of County Kerry in the south-west of Ireland. The town is on the northern side of the neck of the Dingle Peninsula, and is the largest town in County Kerry. The town's population was 26,079 as of the 2022 census, making it the 15th largest urban settlement in Ireland. Tralee is known for the Rose of Tralee International Festival, which has been held annually in August since 1959.

== History ==
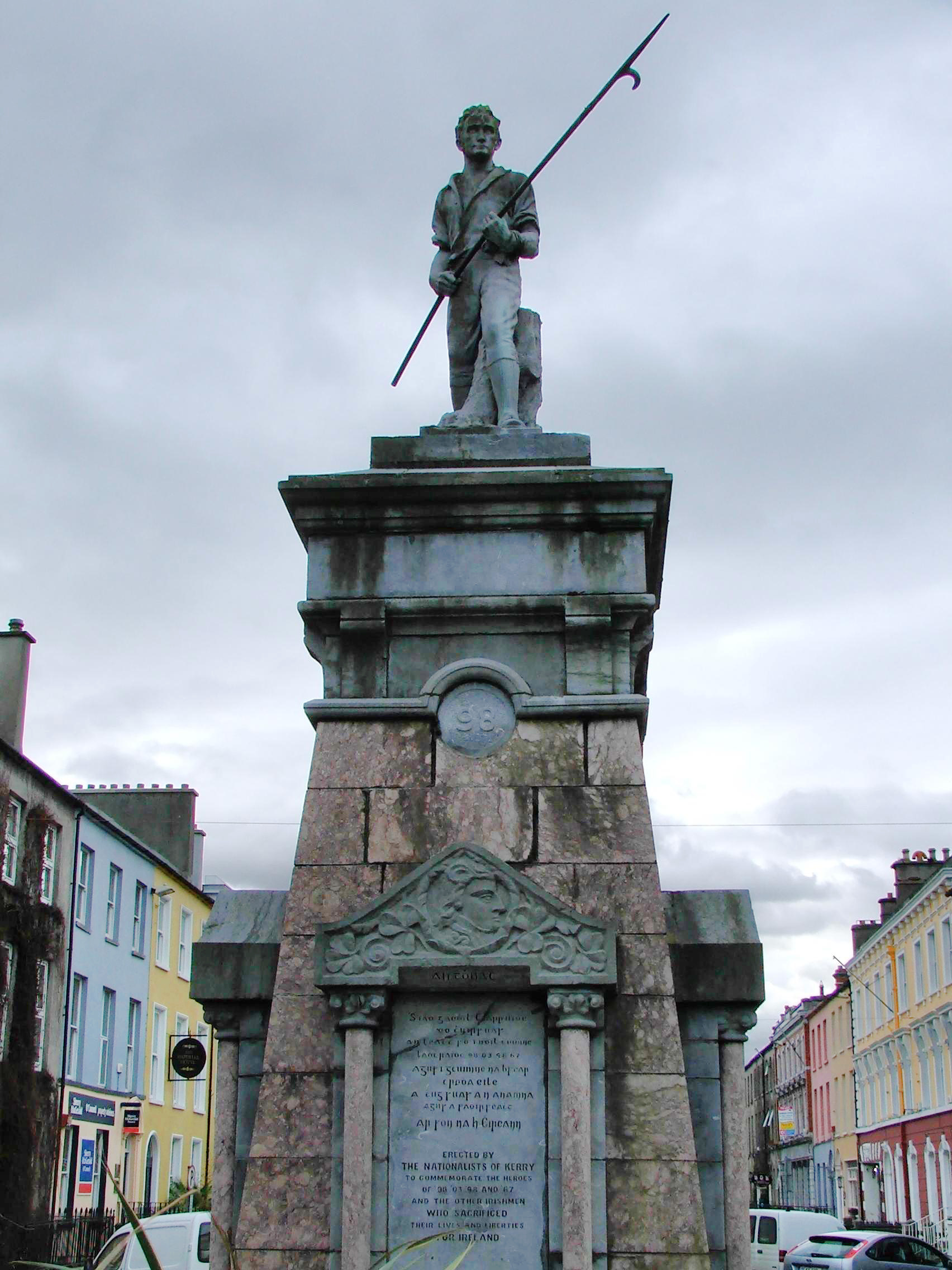
1798 Pikeman Monument

Situated at the confluence of some small rivers and adjacent to marshy ground at the head of Tralee Bay, Tralee is located at the base of an ancient roadway that heads south over the Slieve Mish Mountains. On this old track is located a large boulder sometimes called Scotia's Grave, reputedly the burial place of an ancient queen.

Anglo-Normans founded the town in the 13th century, which became a stronghold of the Earls of Desmond, who built Tralee Castle. John Fitz-Thomas FitzGerald founded the monastery of the Dominican order and was buried there in 1260. The medieval town was burnt in 1580 in retribution for the Desmond Rebellions against Elizabeth I.

Elizabeth I in 1587 granted Tralee to Edward Denny and it was recognised in 1613 by royal charter. Sir Edward was the first of the Dennys to settle in Tralee; the Dennys did not occupy the castle of the Earls of Desmond until 1627 but lived instead at Carrignafeela Castle. Sir Edward's son was Arthur Denny, in whose lifetime the town's charter was granted by James I, containing the right to elect two members of parliament. The third English settler, another Sir Edward, married Ruth Roper, whose father Thomas Roper was the lease holder of the Herbert estate centred on Castleisland. This Sir Edward was a royalist and fought for the King in the Irish Rebellion of 1641 and subsequent Irish Confederate Wars. He died in 1646, before the triumph of Oliver Cromwell over affairs in England and Ireland.

He granted "the circuit of the Abbey" to the corporation set up under the charter, in return for the fees of the town clerk. His son Arthur Denny married Ellen Barry, granddaughter of Richard Boyle, 1st Earl of Cork. The latter held many land titles in West Kerry and also claimed property in Tralee. Sir Edward Denny, 4th Baronet was a notable landlord in his day; during the time of the Great Famine, he maintained rents to suit his tenants, when other landowners increased them. He was a notable Plymouth Brother.

The modern layout of Tralee was created in the 19th century. Denny Street, a wide Georgian street, was completed in 1826 on the site of the old castle. A monument commemorating the 1798 rebellion and the rebellions of 1803, 1848 and 1867 – a statue of a Pikeman – stands in Denny Street. First unveiled in 1905, the original Pikeman stood until the Irish War of Independence. In 1921 the Black and Tans dragged it from its pedestal and destroyed it. In June 1939 a replacement Pikeman was installed, created by renowned Dublin sculptor Albert Power and unveiled by Maud Gonne.

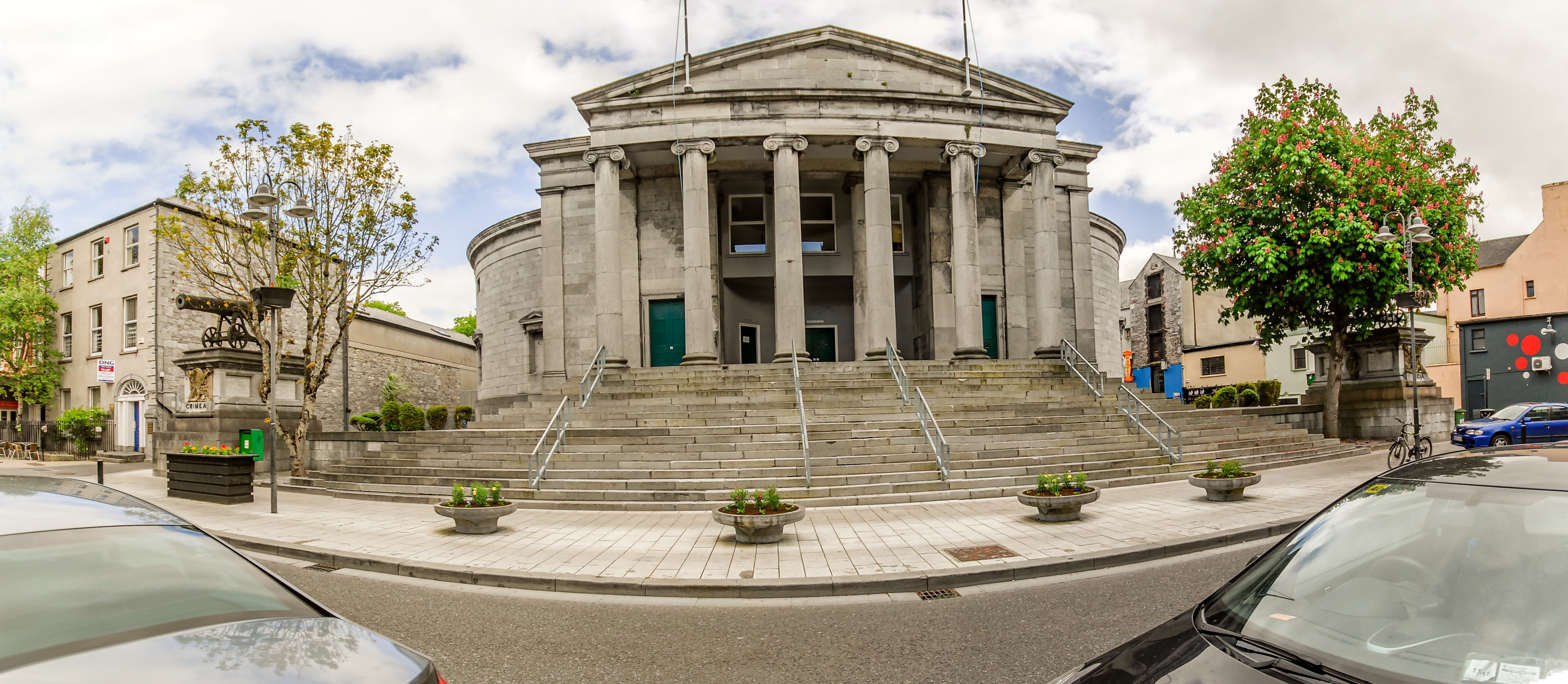
Tralee Courthouse Panorama, May 2015

Tralee Courthouse was designed by William Vitruvius Morrison and built in 1834. It has a monument of two cannons commemorating those Kerrymen who died in the Crimean War (1854–56) and the Indian Rebellion (1857). Ballymullen Barracks was the depot of the Royal Munster Fusiliers.

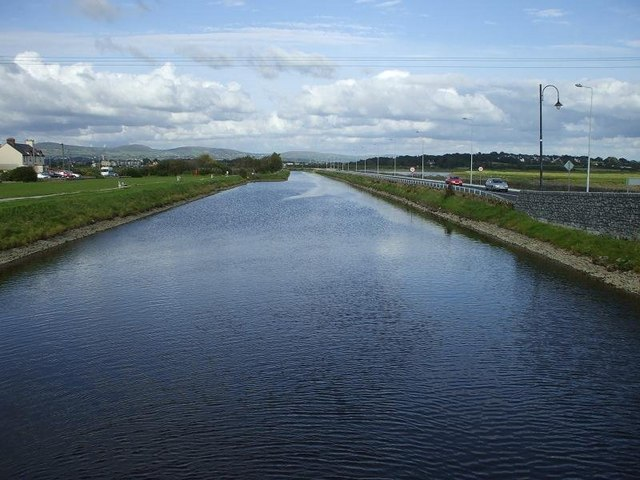
Tralee Ship Canal

The Tralee Ship Canal was built to accommodate larger ships sailing into Tralee, as the existing quay in Blennerville was becoming blocked due to silting. The House of Commons authorised an Act of Parliament in June 1829 for the canal, with work beginning in 1832. Issues with funding meant that the canal was not completed until 1846 when it was opened. The canal was 2 miles long with a new canal basin built in Tralee, and lock gates and a wooden swing bridge constructed in Blennerville. However, not long after the canal opened, it too began to suffer from silting.

By the 1880s, Fenit Harbour was built as a deepwater harbour; it did not suffer from silting. A railway line was constructed between the harbour and Tralee to carry cargo and freight from ships moored there. The canal fell into disuse and neglect, and was finally closed by the mid-20th century. Following the restoration of Blennerville Windmill in the early 1990s, local authorities planned restoration of the canal for use as a tourist attraction. In 1999 the Office of Public Works (OPW) started a restoration project of the canal at a cost of IR£650,000. The basin area of the canal was subsequently redeveloped with apartments blocks built as part of a proposed marina. The towpath along the canal was upgraded and is now used by people as an enjoyable amenity as part of the Dingle Way.

The Dominican church of the Holy Cross was designed by the Irish Gothic Revival architect George Ashlin in 1866 and built by 1871.

=== War of Independence and Civil War ===
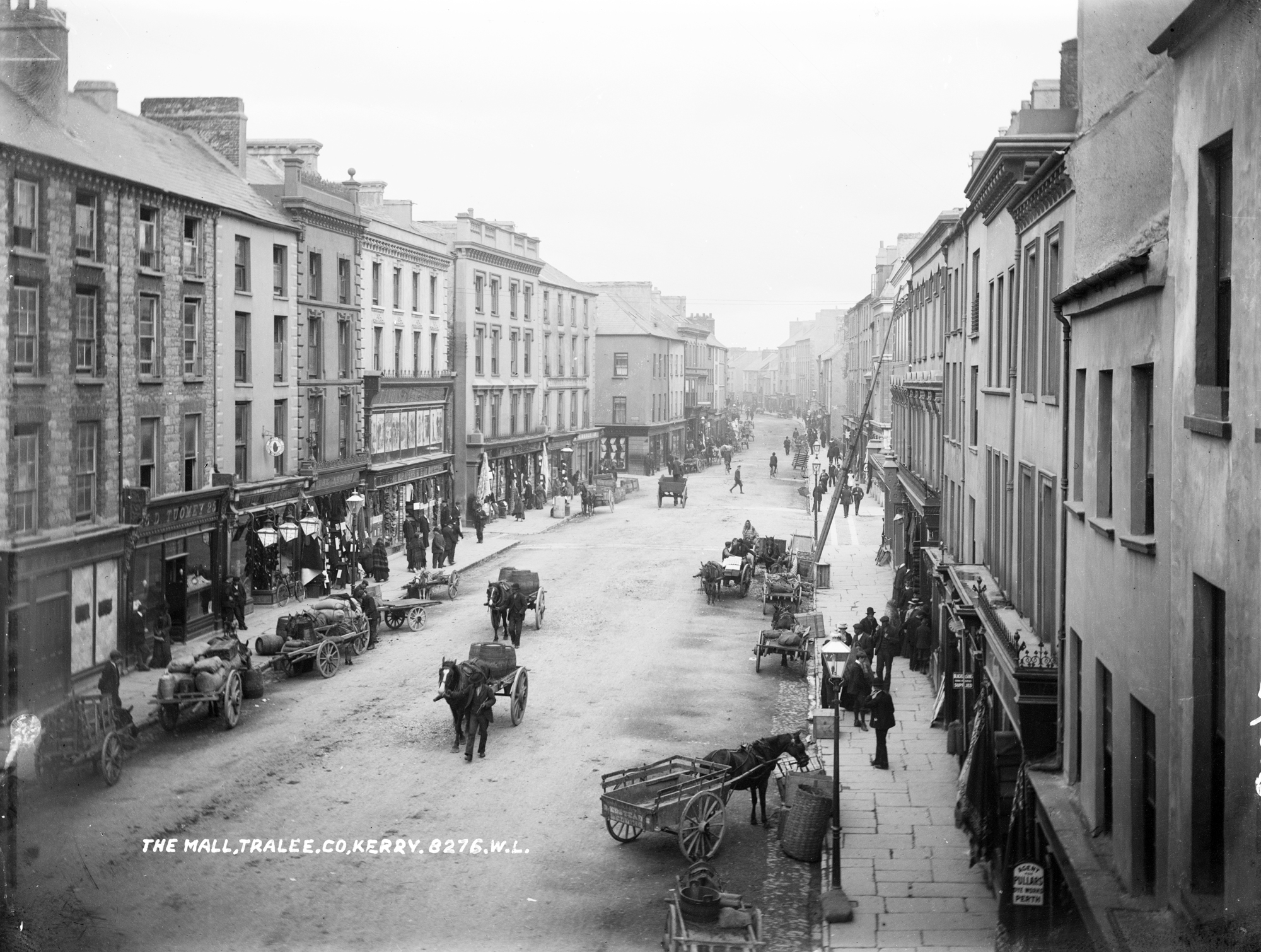
The Mall in the early 1900s

Tralee saw much violence during the Irish War of Independence and Irish Civil War in 1919–1923. In November 1920, the Black and Tans besieged Tralee in revenge for the Irish Republican Army (IRA) abduction and killing of two Royal Irish Constabulary (RIC) men. The Tans closed all the businesses in the town and did not let any food in for a week. They burned several houses and all businesses connected with IRA activists. In the course of the week, they shot dead three local people. The events caused a major international outcry as the press reported that near-famine conditions were prevailing in Tralee by the end of the week.

Historical population
Year	Pop.	±%
1821	7,547	—
1831	9,568	+26.8%
1841	11,363	+18.8%
1851	9,445	−16.9%
1861	10,271	+8.7%
1871	9,506	−7.4%
1881	9,910	+4.2%
1891	9,318	−6.0%
1901	9,867	+5.9%
1911	10,300	+4.4%
1926	10,533	+2.3%
1936	10,285	−2.4%
1946	9,990	−2.9%
1951	11,045	+10.6%
1956	11,612	+5.1%
1961	11,423	−1.6%
1966	11,976	+4.8%
1971	13,263	+10.7%
1981	17,035	+28.4%
1986	17,620	+3.4%
1991	17,862	+1.4%
1996	19,950	+11.7%
2002	21,987	+10.2%
2006	22,744	+3.4%
2011	23,693	+4.2%
2016	23,691	−0.0%
2022	26,079	+10.1%

In August 1922 during the Irish Civil War, Irish Free State troops landed at nearby Fenit and took Tralee from its Anti-Treaty garrison. Nine pro-Treaty and three anti-Treaty soldiers were killed in fighting in the town before the anti-Treaty forces withdrew. The Republicans continued a guerrilla campaign in the surrounding area. In March 1923 Free State troops took nine anti-treaty IRA prisoners from the prison in Tralee and blew them up with a land mine at nearby Ballyseedy. Only Stephen Fuller, a future Irish politician, survived the explosion.

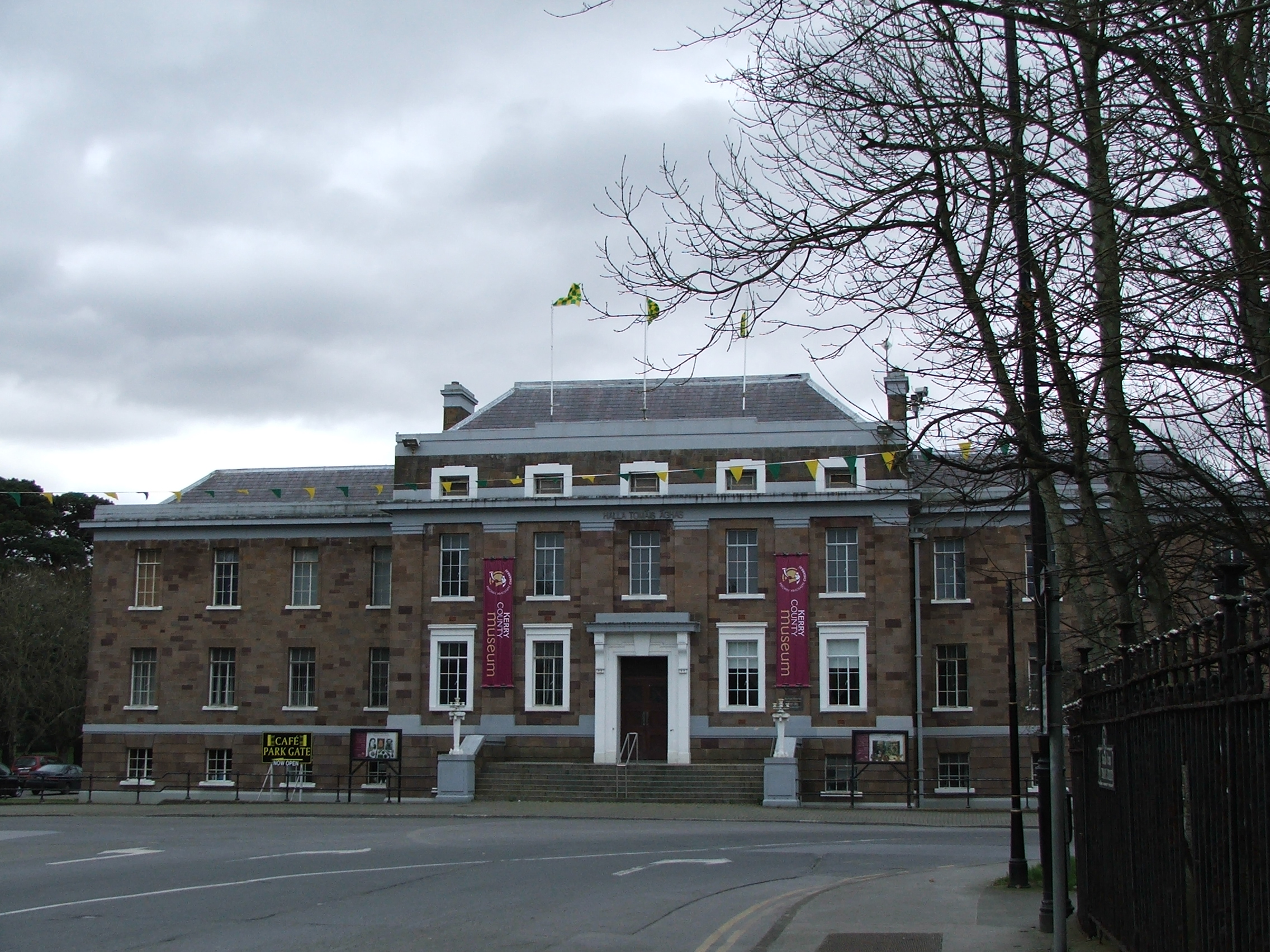
Ashe Memorial Hall houses Kerry County Museum

The Ashe Memorial Hall was built in 1928 at the end of Denny Street; it is dedicated to the memory of Thomas Ashe, an Irish Volunteers officer in the Easter Rising of 1916. The building is built of local sandstone. It housed the headquarters of Kerry County Council and Tralee Urban District Council; both now have moved to other premises. Since 1992 it has housed the Kerry County Museum, which includes a reconstruction of Tralee as of 1450, prior to colonisation.

== Climate ==
The climate of Tralee is, like the rest of Ireland, classified as a maritime temperate climate (Cfb) according to the Köppen climate classification system. Met Éireann maintains a climatological weather station at Valentia Island, 50 km south-west of the town. It is mild and changeable with abundant rainfall and a lack of temperature extremes. The hottest months of the year are July, August, and September with temperatures of around 17 – 18 degrees Celsius. Tralee gets rainfall all year round and the wettest months are October, November, December, and January.

Climate data for Tralee
Month	Jan	Feb	Mar	Apr	May	Jun	Jul	Aug	Sep	Oct	Nov	Dec	Year
Mean daily maximum °C (°F)	8.4 (47.1)	8.9 (48.0)	10.2 (50.4)	12.4 (54.3)	14.7 (58.5)	17.0 (62.6)	18.0 (64.4)	17.8 (64.0)	16.6 (61.9)	13.7 (56.7)	10.5 (50.9)	8.8 (47.8)	13.1 (55.6)
Daily mean °C (°F)	6.0 (42.8)	6.2 (43.2)	6.9 (44.4)	8.8 (47.8)	11.3 (52.3)	13.7 (56.7)	14.9 (58.8)	14.8 (58.6)	13.5 (56.3)	10.9 (51.6)	8.1 (46.6)	6.6 (43.9)	10.1 (50.3)
Mean daily minimum °C (°F)	3.5 (38.3)	3.5 (38.3)	3.7 (38.7)	5.3 (41.5)	7.9 (46.2)	10.3 (50.5)	11.9 (53.4)	11.8 (53.2)	10.5 (50.9)	8.2 (46.8)	5.7 (42.3)	4.3 (39.7)	7.2 (45.0)
Average precipitation mm (inches)	104.5 (4.11)	91.9 (3.62)	90.4 (3.56)	79.4 (3.13)	98.3 (3.87)	87.3 (3.44)	97.7 (3.85)	98.6 (3.88)	83.1 (3.27)	111.5 (4.39)	114.6 (4.51)	115.4 (4.54)	1,172.7 (46.17)
Source: Weather.Directory

== Local government ==
Tralee had an urban district council under the Local Government (Ireland) Act 1898 from 1899 to 2002, which became a town council with twelve members in 2002 under the local Government Act 2001. It was abolished at the 2014 local elections, in common with all town councils in the country under the Local Government Reform Act 2014. The local electoral area (LEA) of Tralee elects 7 councillors to Kerry County Council, which form the Tralee Municipal District.

== Places of interest ==
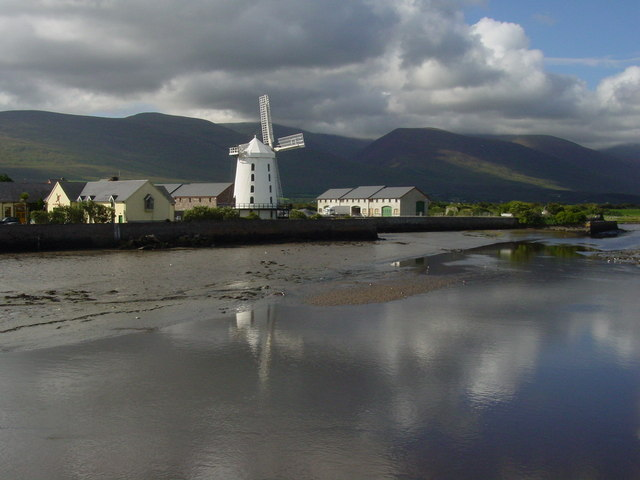
Blennerville Windmill

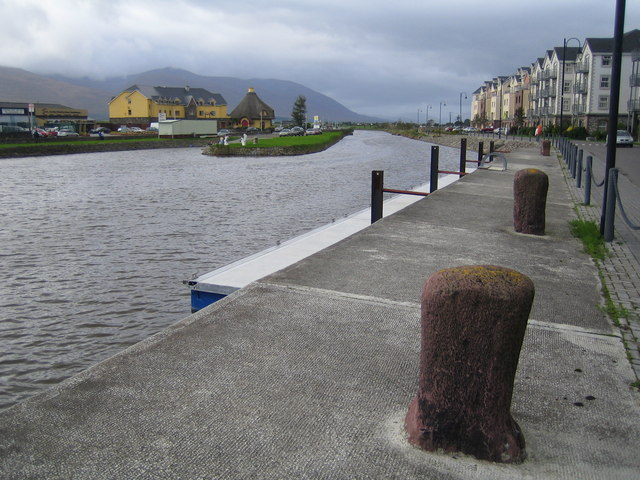
The Basin, Tralee Ship Canal

Tralee is a tourism destination, and there are a number of visitor attractions in the area:

- Kerry County Museum: incorporating the theme park 'Kerry: The Kingdom' and an exhibit that depicts life in medieval Geraldine Tralee.
- Siamsa Tíre: Ireland's National Folk Theatre, offering traditional music and plays in Irish.
- Blennerville Windmill: located about 2 km outside the town, Ireland's largest functioning windmill.
- Tralee Aquadome: A large indoor water leisure facility with a mini-golf course.
- Ballyseedy Wood: Is located 2 km outside Tralee off the N21. It consists of 32 hectares (79 acres) of woodland dating back from the 16th century where Kerry County Council have developed public entrances at the north and south of the wood with car parks and 4 km of gravelled looped pathways. Ash, Oak and Beech trees are part of the wood as are a number of ruins and follies, dating back to the 17th century, with the River Lee (from which Tralee takes its name; not to be confused with the River Lee in County Cork) forming the woodlands northern boundary.
- Tralee Town Park: Tralee has a town park located in the town centre (opposite the Kerry County Museum) with a rose garden comprising over 5,000 roses of different varieties. The park is the location for the annual Féile na mBláth / Tralee Garden Festival – a free midsummer weekend festival of gardening demonstrations, flower arranging, garden tours, musical and choral events.
- Tralee Bay Wetlands and Nature Reserve: Tralee Bay Nature Reserve covers approximately 2,500 hectares (6,200 acres) and stretches from Tralee town westwards to Fenit Harbour and Cloghane, encompassing Tralee Bay, Brandon Bay and the Magharees Peninsula. It includes extensive mudflats at the eastern end, the beaches of Derrymore Island, the sand dunes and lagoons of the Magharees Peninsula. Both the River Lee and Brandon (Owenmore) estuaries feature wide expanses of sheltered intertidal flats, often fringed with saltmarsh vegetation. The Wetlands Centre which opened in 2012 is designed as a microcosm of the wild nature reserve where visitors are introduced to the fresh and saltwater habitats. Visitors can travel on a safari boat ride through the recreated reed and freshwater channels in the centre.
- Tralee Ship Canal: Opened in 1846, this 2-mile-long canal connects Tralee to Tralee Bay where it passes by Blennerville Windmill. The Dingle Way runs along the towpath of the canal.
- Dingle Way: (Irish: Slí Chorca Dhuibhne) A 162-kilometre (101-mile) long National Waymarked Trail that begins and ends in Tralee and is typically completed in eight days.
- Ratass Church: a tenth-century medieval church, with a sixth-century ogham stone. Located in the eastern suburbs of Tralee.

== Rose of Tralee ==
The Rose of Tralee festival is an international competition that is celebrated among Irish communities all over the world. The festival, held annually in August since 1959, takes its inspiration from a nineteenth-century ballad of the same name about a woman called Mary, who because of her beauty was called The Rose of Tralee. The contest, broadcast over two nights by RTÉ, is one of the highest-viewed shows on Irish television with over a million people watching.

To commemorate the Rose of Tralee tradition, the Rose Garden in the Tralee Town Park is home to a life-size bronze statue depicting the original Rose of Tralee Mary O'Connor and the author of the Rose of Tralee ballad William Pembroke Mulchinock sculpted by an Irish sculptor Jeanne Rynhart (unveiled in 2009), as well as the Rose Wall of Honour – a series of glass panels that will contain the name of every Rose who has participated in the Festival since 1959 (unveiled in 2013 on the 55th anniversary of the Rose of Tralee International Festival). Both statues were commissioned by Tralee Town Council.

== Archaeological sites ==
Archaeological sites around Tralee and throughout the County of Kerry, including a number of ring-forts, are listed for preservation in the Kerry County Development Plan 2009–15. These include Casement's Fort, an ancient ring fort where Roger Casement had been hiding before his arrest. There is also an Iron Age fort at Caherconree, overlooking Tralee Bay.

An example of a Sheela na gig is now located in the Christian Round Tower at Rattoo, Ballyduff, a few kilometres north of Tralee. There is also a monument to Saint Brendan the Navigator at Fenit, with reproductions of ancient Irish structures.

== Media ==
The town has two local weekly newspapers, The Kerryman and Kerry's Eye while the Tralee Outlook and Tralee Advertiser are also published weekly.

The town has a commercial radio station, Radio Kerry, which commenced operations in 1990. Spin South West also had a studio on Castle Street, which opened in 2016 but is now vacant.

== Transport ==
=== Road ===
Tralee is served by National Primary and Secondary roads as well as local routes. A 13.5 km bypass of Tralee consisting of dual and single carriageway sections was opened on 16 August 2013. The bypass connects four of the five national routes — the N21, N22, N69 and N70 — which terminate in Tralee.

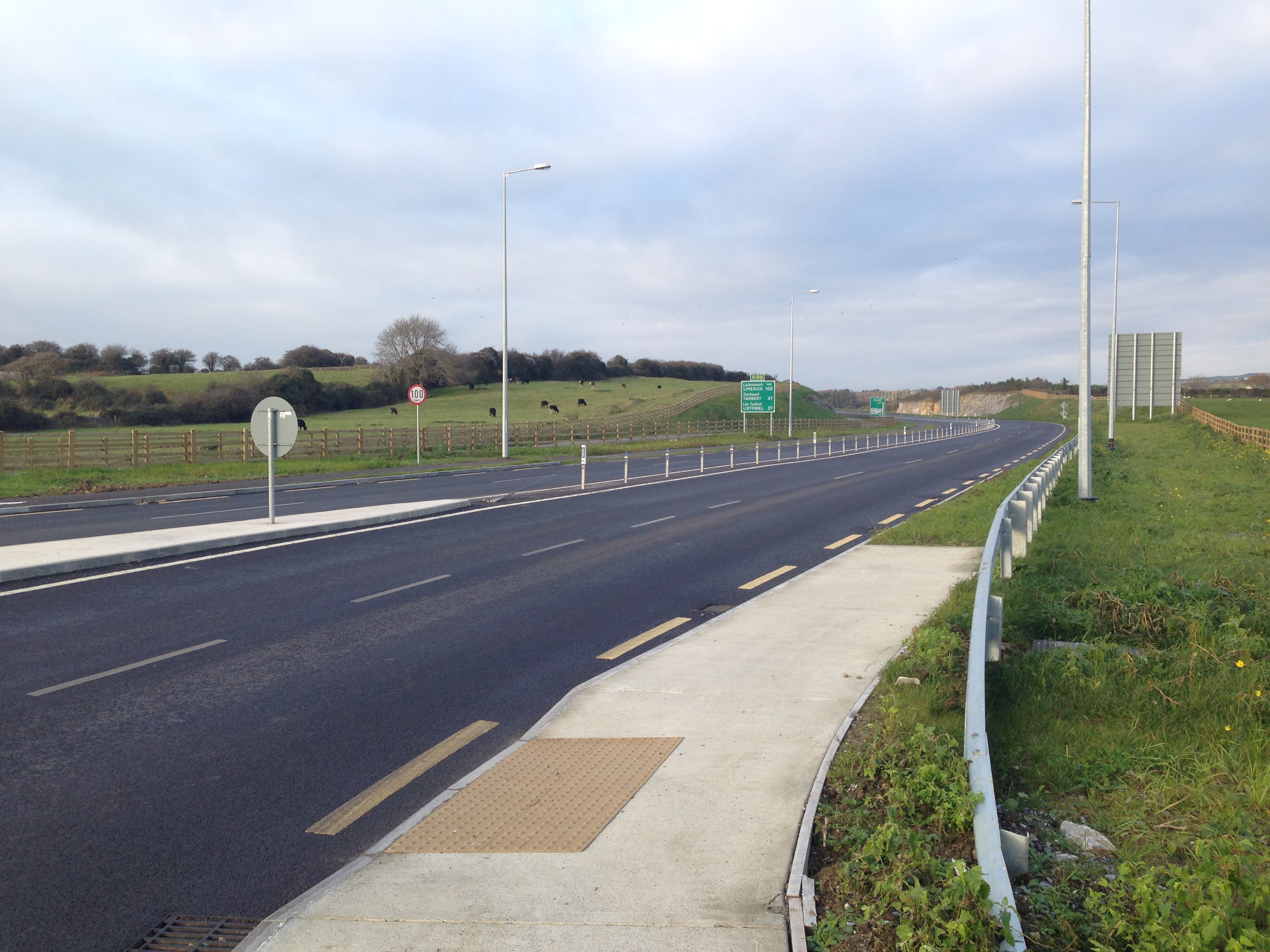
N21/N69 Tralee Bypass

National primary routes:

- east/north-east to Limerick
- south-east to Killarney and Cork

National secondary routes:

- north to Listowel, Tarbert, Foynes and Limerick
- south-west to Killorglin, Ring of Kerry on Iveragh Peninsula and Kenmare
- west to Dingle

Regional roads:

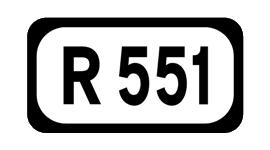
- north/north-west to Tarbert via Ardfert, Ballyheigue, Ballybunion and Ballylongford
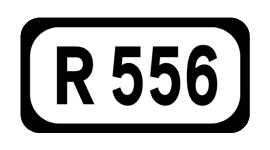
- north to Abbeydorney (it links up with R551 to Ballybunion)
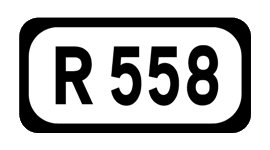
- west to Fenit Harbour

=== Bus ===
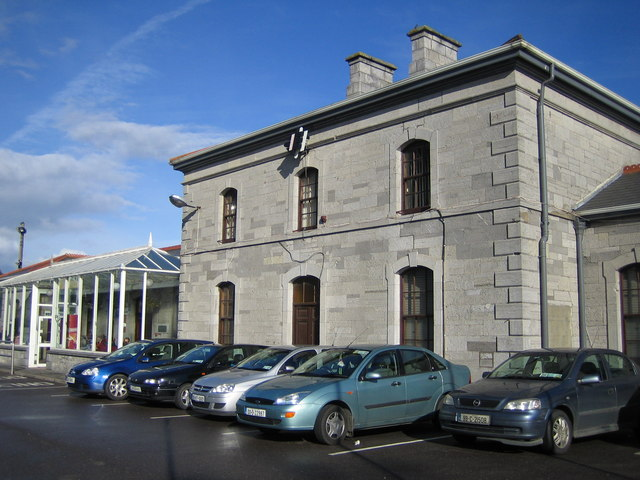
Tralee railway station

The bus station in Tralee is a regional hub for Bus Éireann, providing services to Limerick (with onward connections to Galway), Cork, Killarney and Dingle. The current bus station opened on 26 February 2007.

Several local routes radiate from Tralee and a number of these have had their frequency increased in recent years. Local routes include: 13 (Limerick via Listowel), 40 (Cork via Killarney), 272 (Tarbert via Ballybunion), 274 Ballyheigue via Banna), 275 (Dingle), 279 (Killorglin) and 285 (Kerry Airport via Castleisland).

=== Rail ===
A train service to Killarney railway station, and via Mallow to Cork and Dublin is provided by the national railway operator Iarnród Éireann. From the Dublin-Cork line, there are connecting trains at Limerick Junction for Limerick, Clonmel and Waterford. Further links are available at Limerick to Ennis, Athenry, Oranmore, and Galway.

The current Tralee railway station, Casement station named after Roger Casement, was opened on 18 July 1859. There were also two other adjacent stations, now closed and demolished, in the North Circular Road area. One was the terminus of the "North Kerry" line which ran to Limerick via Listowel and Newcastle West, and the other was the terminus of the narrow gauge Tralee and Dingle Light Railway.

The Tralee and Dingle Light Railway was once one of Europe's most western railways. It opened on 31 March 1891, connecting Tralee and Dingle by rail along the Dingle Peninsula, and was closed in June 1953. In 1993 a 3 km section was reopened as a preserved line between the Aquadome in Tralee and Blennerville Windmill. Currently this railway is no longer in operation.

A standard gauge railway used to operate to Fenit Harbour from Tralee, diverging from the North Kerry line to the northwest of the town, before closing in June 1978. Currently a section of this railway has been restored as a walk/cycle way in the Tralee urban area and it is hoped in the future that this will be extended to Fenit, similar along the lines of the Great Southern Trail which has been created on the closed North Kerry line route in western County Limerick.

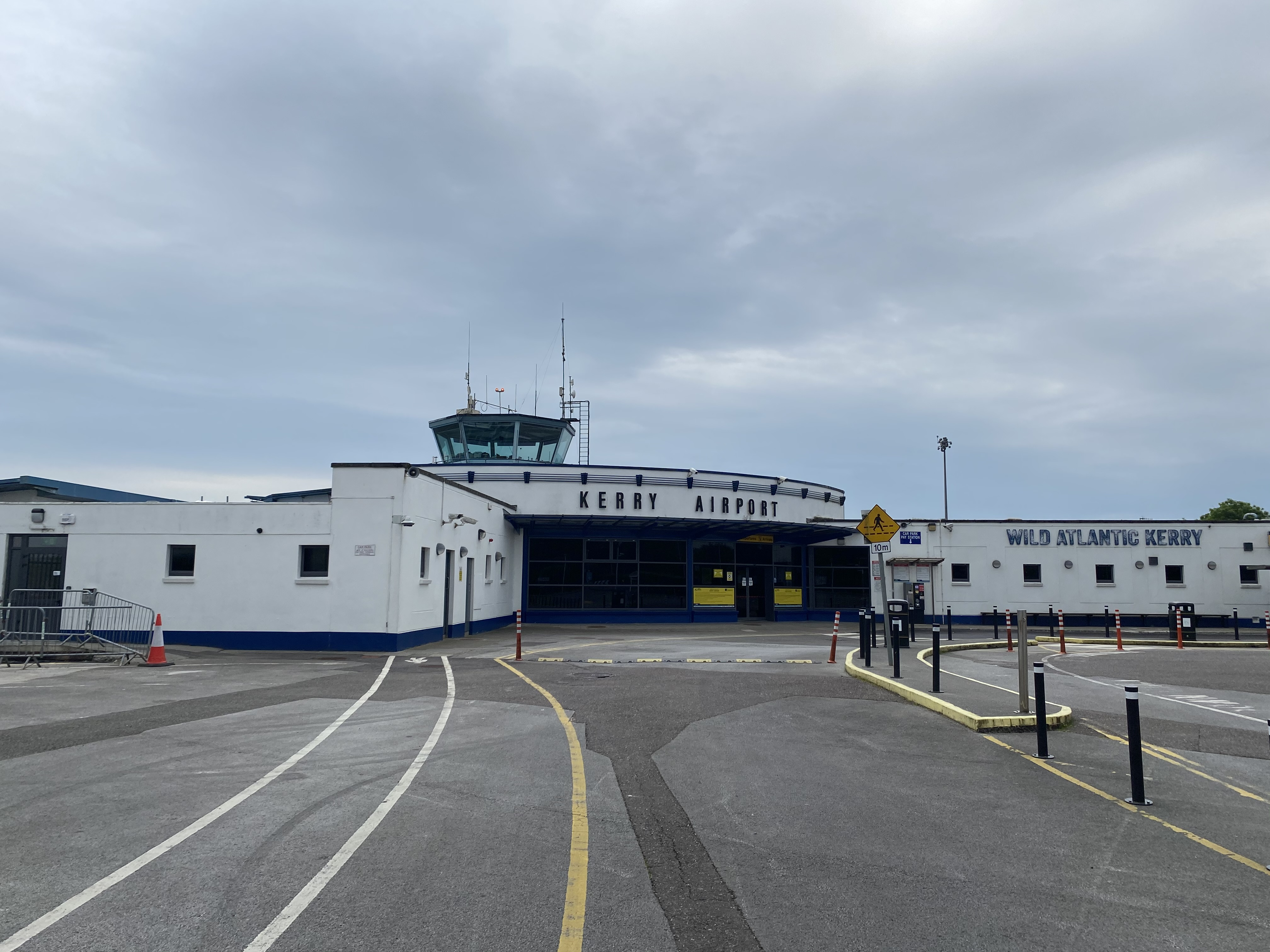
Kerry Airport

=== Air ===
Kerry Airport, located 20 km from Tralee in Farranfore, provides air services to Dublin, London Luton, London Stansted, Frankfurt-Hahn and seasonally, Alicante and Faro. Ryanair now operates seasonal services to Berlin International Airport. Connecting trains run from Farranfore railway station to Tralee and Killarney Railway Station in Killarney.

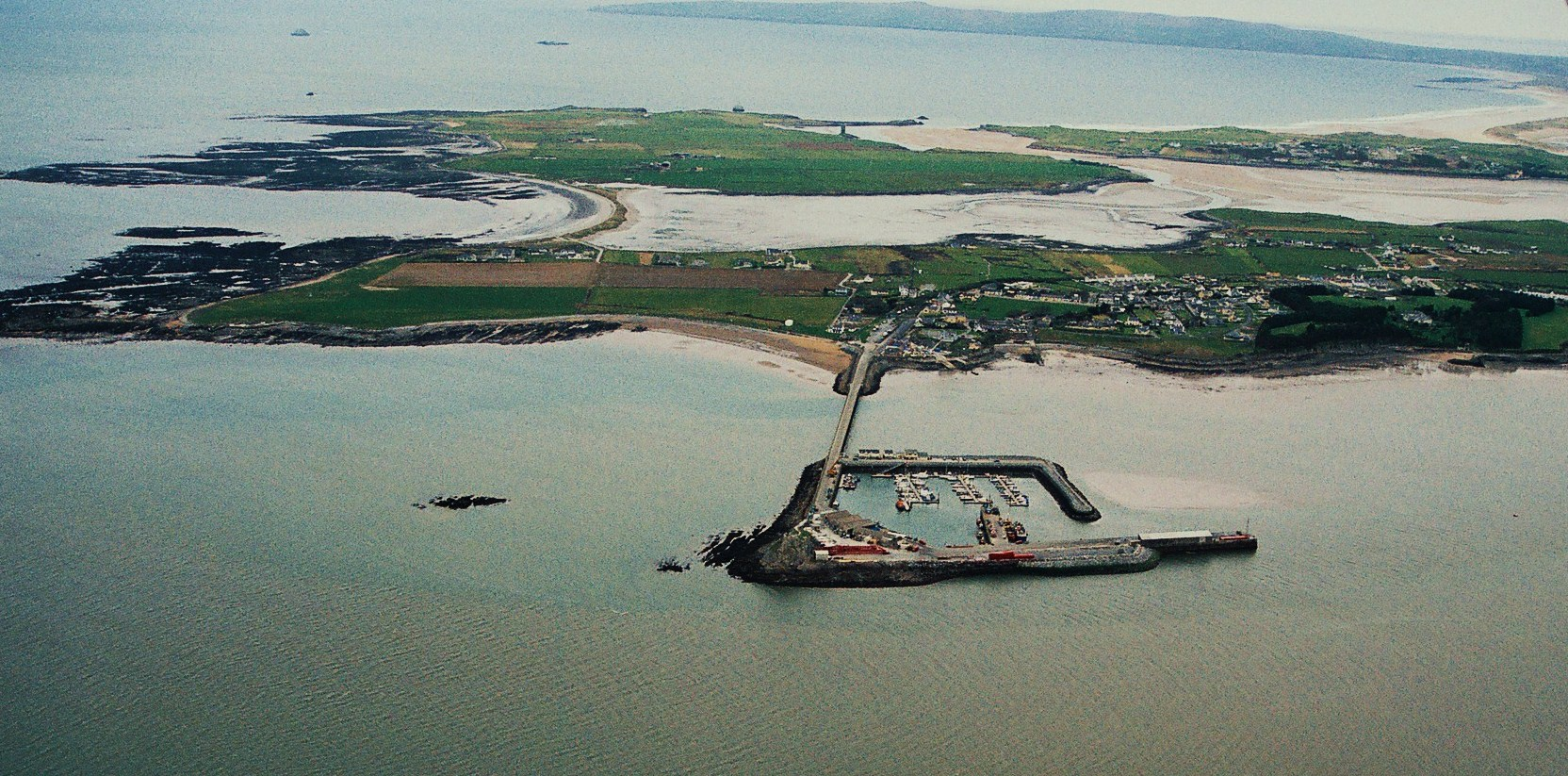
Fenit, Tralee's local port

=== Sea ===
The local port for Tralee is Fenit, about 10 km west of the town on the north side of the estuary. Catering for ships of up to 17,000 tonnes, the port is a picturesque mixed-use harbour with fishing boats and a thriving marina (136 berths). The 2 mile long Tralee Ship Canal provides a navigable connection between Tralee itself and the sea.

== Healthcare ==
University Hospital Kerry opened in 1984, and is the third-largest acute hospital in the Health Service Executive South Region. It serves as the main hospital for County Kerry and also serves the people in parts of North Cork and West Limerick.

The Bon Secours Hospital, founded in 1921, is a private hospital owned by the Roman Catholic Bon Secours Sisters and offers healthcare to privately insured patients. It forms part of the Bon Secours Health System, the largest private healthcare network in Ireland.

== Education ==
In common with all parts of Ireland, most schools at all levels in Tralee are managed and owned by the churches. These include the Roman Catholic schools of CBS (Scoil na mBráithre), Gaelscoil Mhic Easmainn, Holy Family, Presentation Primary School (Sacred Heart), St Ita's and St Joseph's, St John's, and St Mary's. St John's on Ashe Street is a Church of Ireland school. Tralee Educate Together School is multidenominational, and is neither owned nor managed by any church.

At secondary level, most schools are explicitly Roman Catholic in ethos. These include Mercy Secondary School, Mounthawk; Presentation Secondary School; St Ita's and St Joseph's; St Mary's CBS (The Green). Coláiste Gleann Lí Post Primary School (formally Tralee Community College) and Gaelcholáiste Chiarraí are non-denominational.

At third level, the Munster Technological University (MTU) is the main third level institution in County Kerry. Originally opened as the Regional Technical College, Tralee in 1977 it became the Institute of Technology, Tralee (ITT or IT Tralee) in 1997 before merging into the MTU in 2020. It has an enrolment of about 3,500 students studying in areas such as business, computing, science, engineering and health. The university has two campuses: the North campus (opened in Dromtacker in 2001) and the South campus (opened in Clash in 1977) which are approximately 2.4 km (1.5 mi) apart. Kerry College of Further Education (KCFE) is a provider of further education programmes in Kerry. The college offers a range of Level 5 and Level 6 programmes on the NFQ.

== Sport ==
=== Gaelic Athletic Association ===
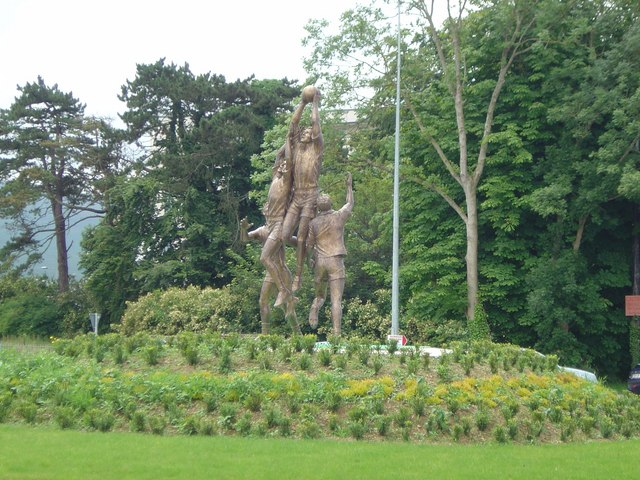
Kerry Gaelic Football Memorial at Mile Height

Austin Stack Park is the main Gaelic Athletic Association (GAA) stadium in Tralee. The ground is named after Austin Stack, an Irish revolutionary and captain of the All-Ireland-winning Kerry Gaelic football team of 1904. It is located in the centre of Tralee. It hosts many Kerry GAA home games, mostly football league games and both league and championship hurling. The County Championship football and hurling finals are normally held here.

Austin Stacks GAA club is based at the top of Rock Street and its former players include Mikey Sheehy, Ger Power, John O'Keeffe and Kieran Donaghy.

Other GAA clubs in the area include John Mitchels GAA club (based in the Boherbee and Camp area), Kerins O'Rahilly's GAA (Strand Road area of the town), Na Gaeil GAA club (Oakpark area), St. Patricks, Blennerville (about 1 km outside Tralee), Tralee Parnells (promoting hurling), MTU Kerry GAA (at the Munster Technological University). Tralee Mitchels and Tralee Celtic are former GAA clubs.

Fitzgerald-Jones Handball Club is based at the Sports Complex in Tralee.

=== Soccer ===
Tralee is the home of League of Ireland football in the county. Kerry F.C. were formed in 2023 and play at Mounthawk Park. The club compete in the League of Ireland First Division and the FAI Cup.

The Kerry District League is based in Mounthawk Park, Tralee.

Tralee Dynamos is Tralee's most senior soccer club, playing in the Kerry District League. St. Brendan's Park F.C. also plays in the Kerry District League.

=== Racket sports ===
Tralee Tennis Club is based on Dan Spring Road. County Badminton Club meets in the Presentation Secondary School Gym.

=== Cricket ===
County Kerry Cricket Club play at the Oyster Oval based at the nearby village of Spa on the shores of Tralee Bay. The club is a member of the Munster Cricket Union.

=== Cycling ===
The Chain Gang Cycling Club is a Tralee-based cycling club founded in 2008. Other cycling clubs include Tralee Bicycle Club (founded 1992), Tralee Cycling Club (founded 1953), Kingdom Cycling Club, and Na Gaeil Cycling Cycling Club.

=== Basketball ===
Basketball clubs include St. Brendan's Basketball Club, Tralee Magic Basketball Club, Tralee Titans, Tralee Tigers (defunct), and Tralee Warriors.

=== Golf and pitch and putt ===
Tralee Pitch and Putt Club is located at Collis Sandes House in Killeen.

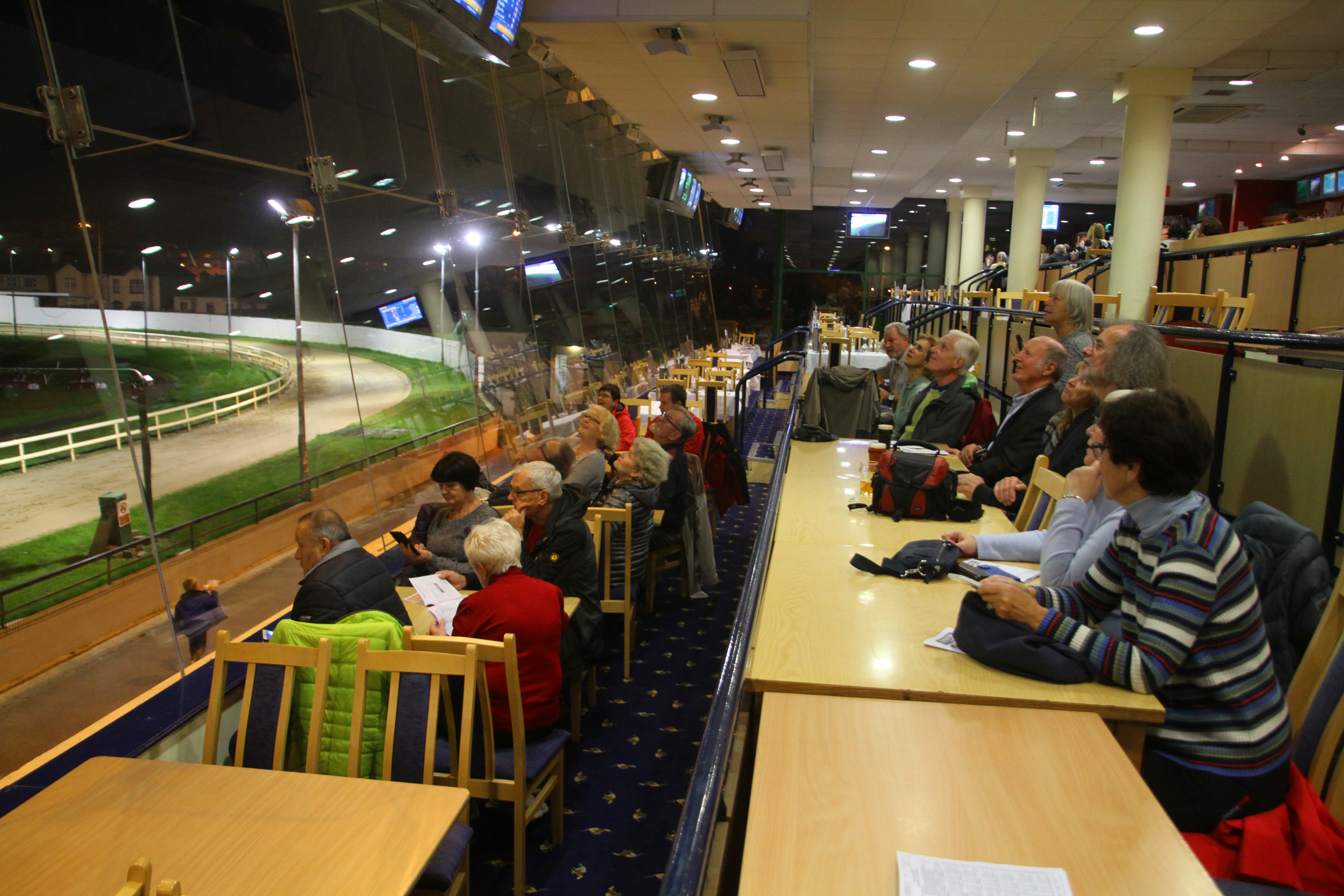
Spectators at Tralee's greyhound racing stadium

=== Triathlon ===
Tralee Triathlon Club was founded in 2009 and is one of the largest clubs in Ireland with around 300 adult members. They run the annual Tri Kingdom Come Sprint distance triathlon in Fenit during the August Weekend.

=== Watersports ===
Kingdom Swimming Club is based at the Sports Complex in Tralee. Tralee Bay Sailing Club and Tralee Bay Swimming Club are both based in Fenit. Tralee Rowing Club was founded in 2004 and is located at the Basin.

=== Rugby ===
Tralee Rugby Football Club ground is in Ballyard.

=== Athletics ===
Tralee Harriers is a local athletics club.

=== Greyhound racing ===
Tralee Greyhound Racing has a stadium on Brewery Road.

== Notable people ==
Notable Tralee people include:

- Saint Brendan, monastic saint and navigator, born near Tralee
- Danny Barnes, rugby player
- Joe Barrett, footballer, born in Tralee
- Denis Behan, soccer player
- Daniel Bohan, footballer
- Leonard Boyle, priest and scholar
- Bryan Cooper, jockey
- Robert Day, judge
- Billy Dennehy, soccer player
- Darren Dennehy, soccer player
- Ultan Dillane, rugby player for Connacht and Ireland
- Kieran Donaghy, footballer
- Michael Dwyer, journalist
- Anna Fahy, Irish republican
- Mike Finn, former Gaelic and Australian Rules footballer
- Robert D. FitzGerald, surveyor, botanist
- Rea Garvey, singer of Reamonn
- Ailbhe Ní Ghearbhuigh, poet
- Shane Guthrie, footballer
- Christie Hennessy, singer/songwriter
- John Horgan, politician and academic
- Richard Johnson, President of Irish High Court
- Tracey K, musician
- Úna-Minh Kavanagh, journalist and author
- Barry John Keane, footballer
- Eddie Kelliher, Olympic sailor and businessman
- Richard Kelliher, recipient of the Victoria Cross
- Victoria Kennefick, (Cork-native) poet
- Joan Kennelly, photographer and founder of Kerry's Eye
- Pádraig Kennelly, founder and editor of Kerry's Eye
- Joe Keohane, footballer
- William Kirby, footballer
- J. J. Lee, historian and former senator
- Gareth Mannix, sound engineer/producer
- Savannah McCarthy, footballer for the Republic of Ireland women's national football team
- David Moran, footballer
- Maurice Moynihan, Governor of Central Bank
- Timothy V. Murphy, actor
- David O'Callaghan, footballer
- Sean O'Callaghan, Provisional IRA member
- Graham O'Connell, footballer
- Denis O'Donnell, businessman
- Patrick Denis O'Donnell, military/historian
- Dan O'Keeffe, footballer
- John O'Keeffe, footballer
- Arthur O'Leary, composer and pianist
- Seán O'Shea, Footballer
- Aisling O'Sullivan, actor
- John O'Sullivan, rugby player
- Ger Power, footballer
- Declan Quill, footballer
- Micheál Quirke, footballer
- Boyle Roche, politician
- Eric Roche, guitarist
- Elise Sandes, humanitarian
- Larry Sharpe, professional wrestler
- Billy Sheehan, footballer
- Mikey Sheehy, footballer
- Dan Spring, politician, footballer, and rugby player
- Dick Spring, politician, footballer, and rugby player
- Austin Stack, revolutionary and footballer
- Barry John Walsh, footballer
- Tommy Walsh, footballer

== Twinning ==
Tralee is twinned with Westlake, Ohio and Springfield, Massachusetts, both in the United States.

Tralee also has a twinning arrangement with Beit Sahur in Palestine.

== Gallery ==
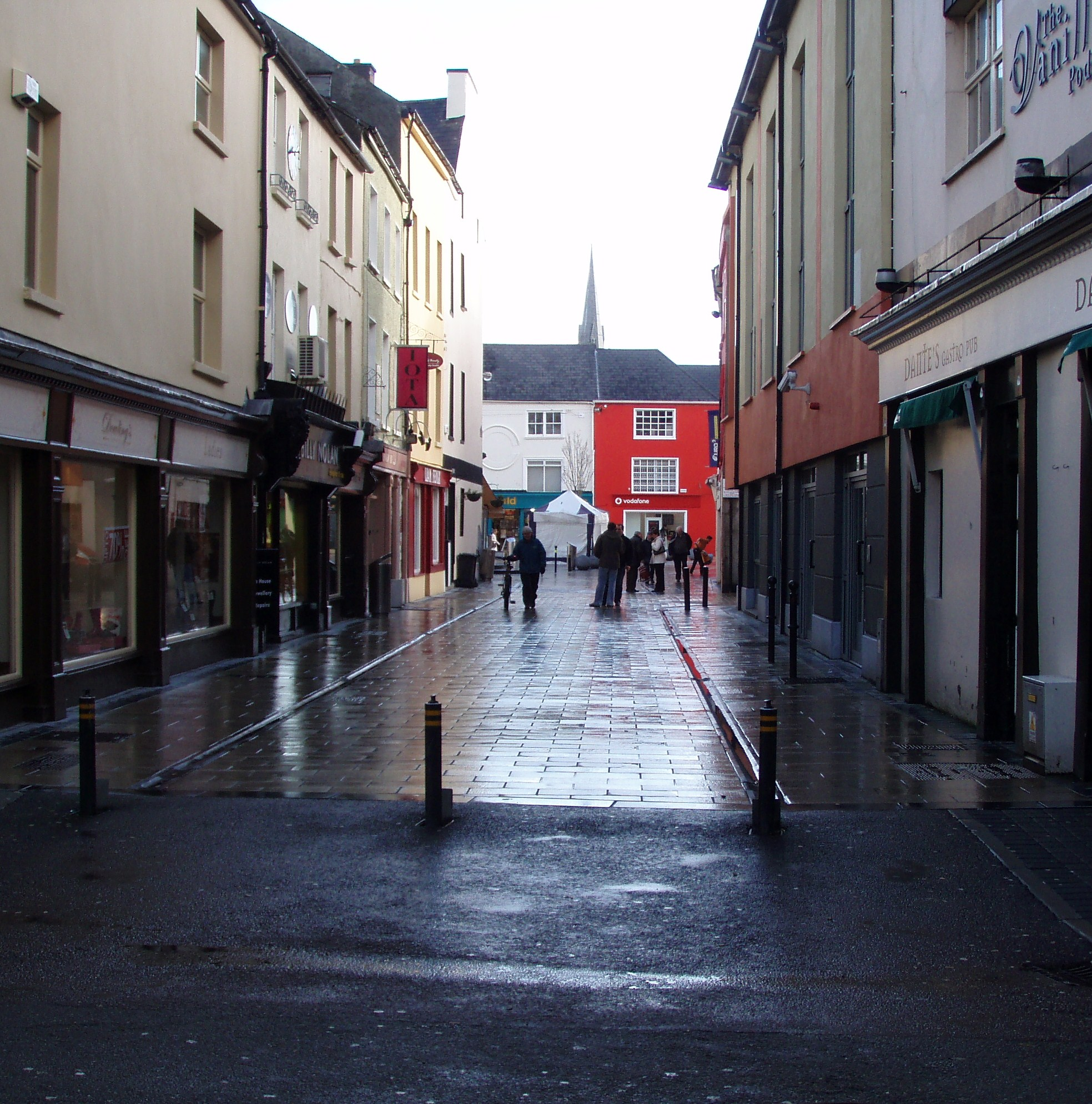
Dominick Street, Tralee

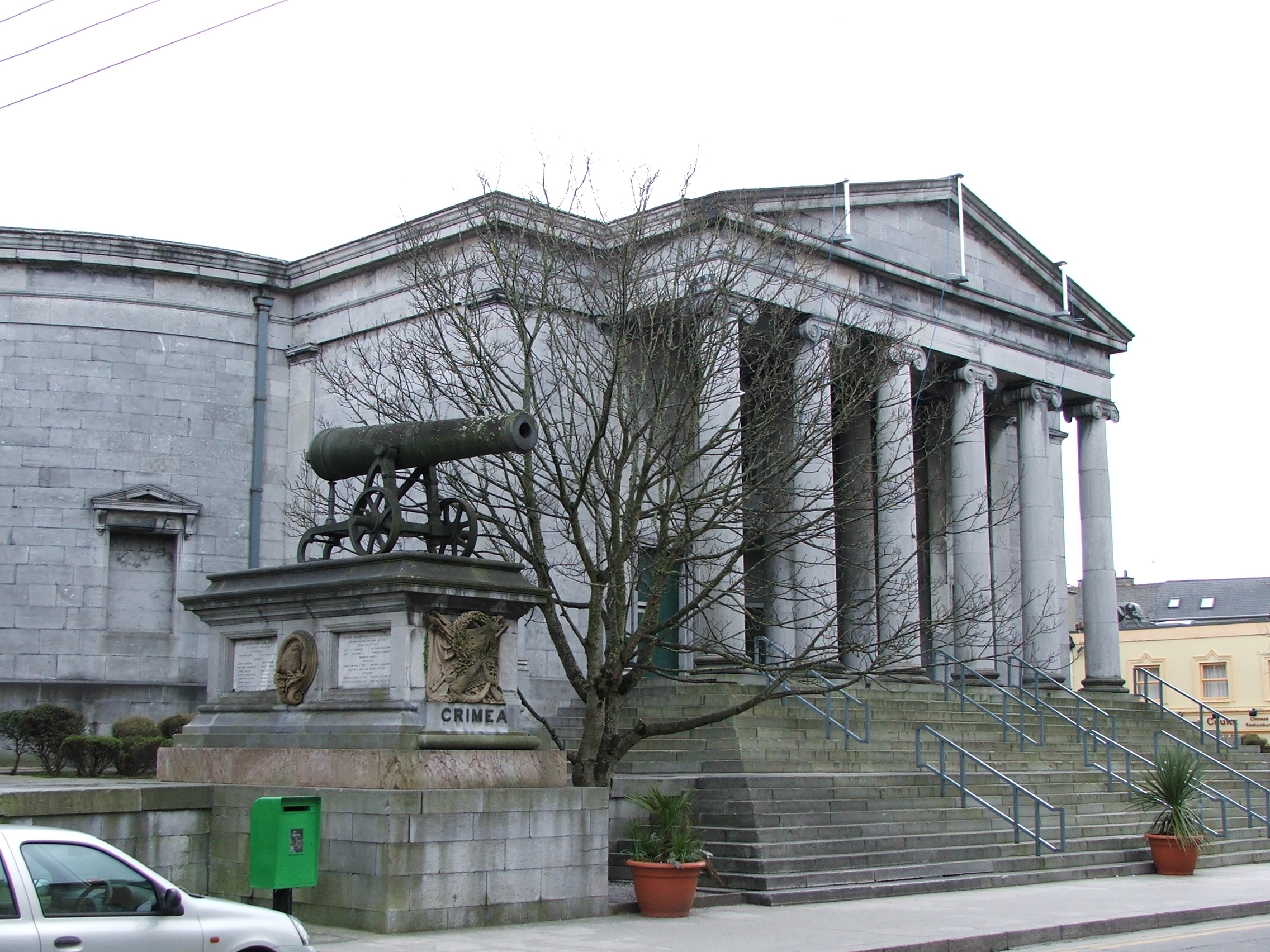
Tralee Courthouse

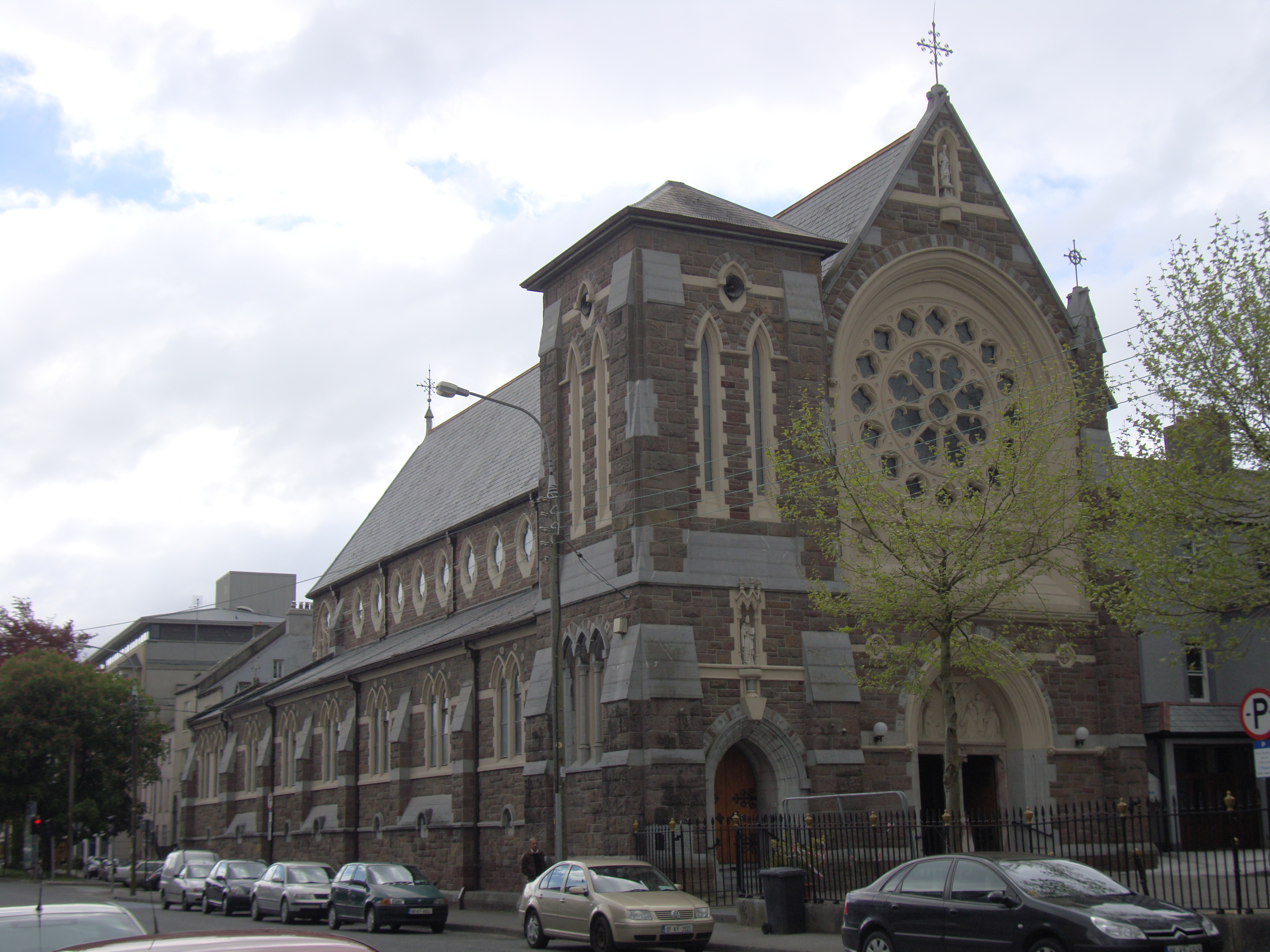
Dominican Church of Holy Cross

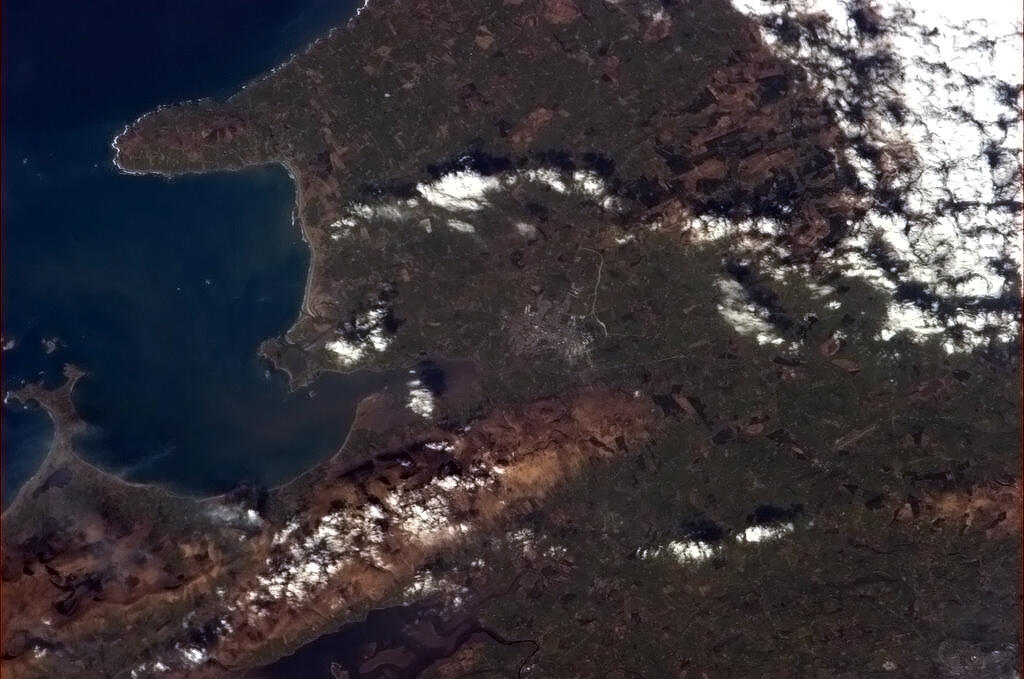
Tralee from the International Space Station

== See also ==
- List of abbeys and priories in Ireland (County Kerry)
- List of towns and villages in Ireland
- Market Houses in Ireland
- Banna Strand
- Wild Atlantic Way
- Tralee (UK Parliament constituency)
