= Fenit =

Harbour village in County Kerry, Ireland

Fenit An Fhianait (Irish)
- Village
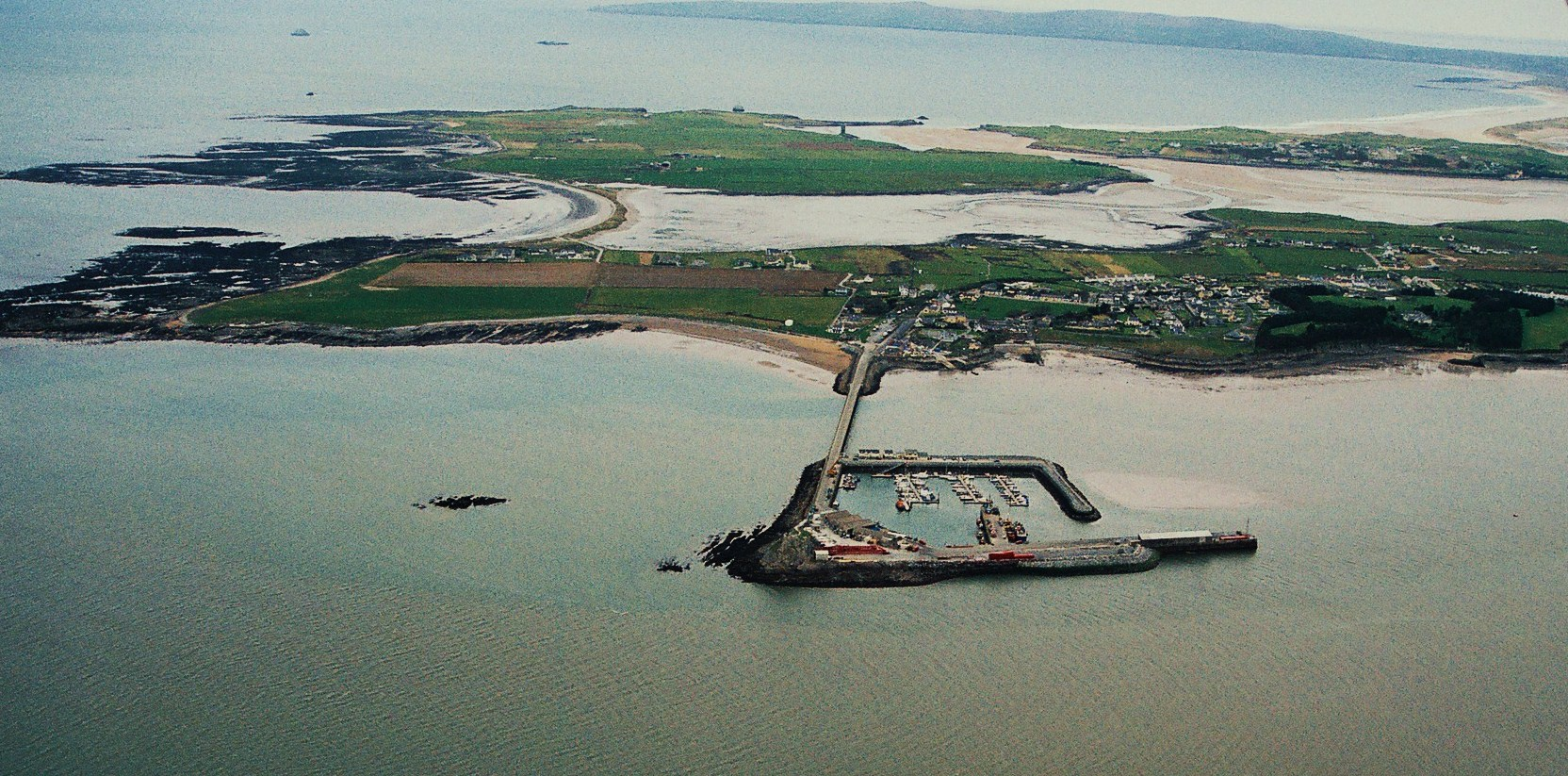
- Fenit village, harbour and island.

- Location in Ireland
- Coordinates: 52°16′37″N 9°51′29″W
- Country: Ireland
- Province: Munster
- County: County Kerry
- Elevation: 0 m (0 ft)

Population (2022)
  - Total: 619
- Time zone: UTC+0 (WET)
  - Summer (DST): UTC-1 (IST (WEST))
- Irish Grid Reference: Q725154

Fenit (Irish: An Fhianait) is a small village in County Kerry, Ireland, located on north side of Tralee Bay about 10 km (6 mi) west of Tralee town, just south of the Shannon Estuary. It is also a civil parish. The bay is enclosed from the Atlantic by the Maharee spit which extends northwards from the Dingle peninsula. Fenit harbour is a mixed function sea port, where fishing, freight import and export, and a 136 berth marina are the main forms of business. As of the 2022 CSO census of Ireland, Fenit had a population of 619 people.

== History ==
Saint Brendan, the navigator, was probably born north west of the village on Fenit Island in close proximity to what is now Fenit harbour around 484, and is honoured by a large bronze monument in the harbour area. It has been suggested that Brendan arrived in the Americas prior to Christopher Columbus but this has not been proven. Though Tim Severin demonstrated it is possible that a leather-clad boat such as the one described in the Navigatio could have potentially reached North America.

In 1588, as the Spanish Armada dispersed, the sloop Nuestra Señora del Socorro (Our Lady of the Socorro) (75 tons) anchored at Fenit, in Tralee Bay and surrendered. The 24 men on board were taken into custody, marched to Tralee castle, and, after interrogation, executed.

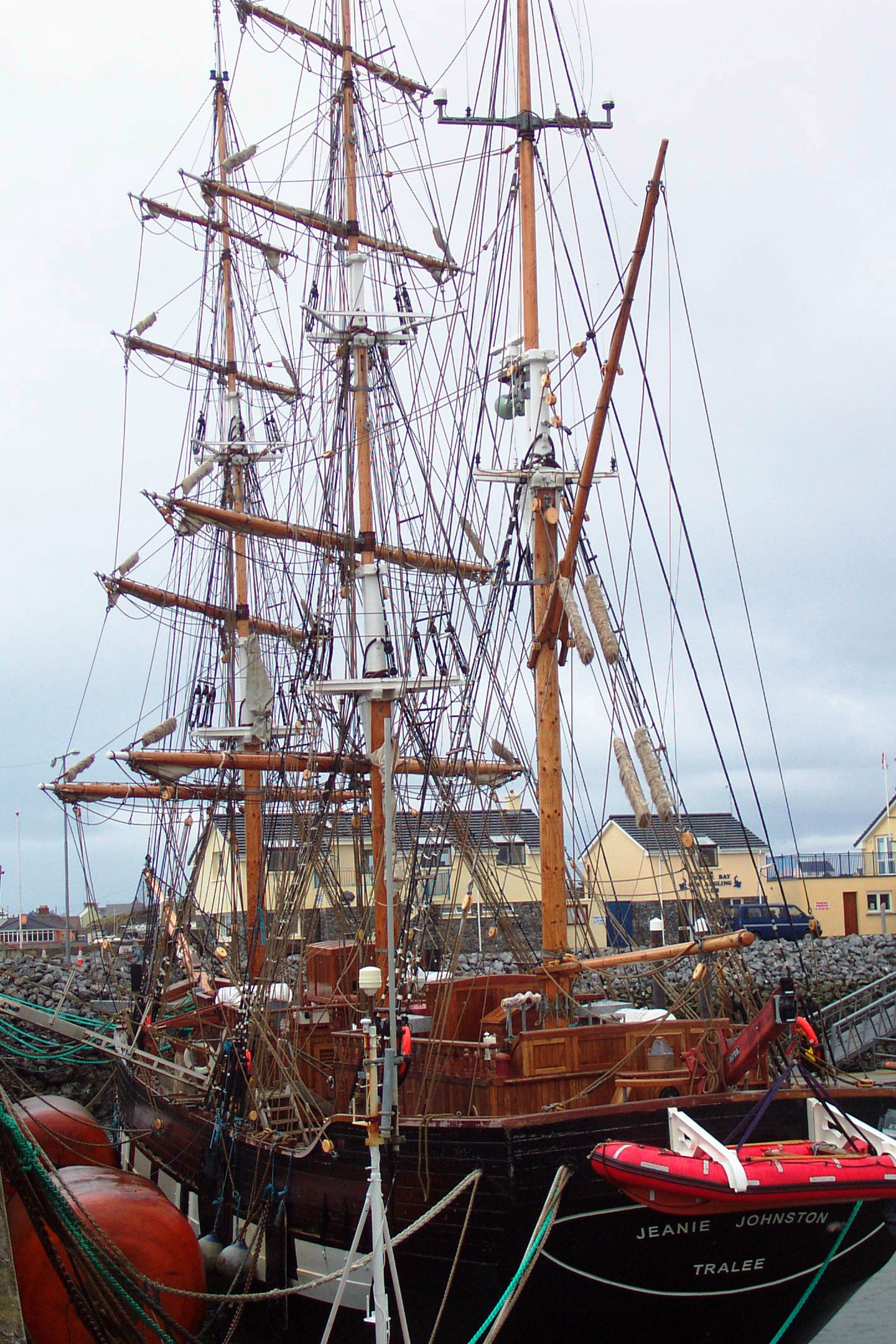
Jeanie Johnston replica at Fenit harbour

In the mid-19th century, the sailing ship Jeanie Johnston traded out of Tralee, transporting emigrants to the US and Canada and in 2000 a replica was built in Fenit harbour.

A post office was opened in the village between 1883 and 1885 and postal services are still provided. Fenit is recorded as having cancelled paquebot mail.

The village and environs were the scene of the ill-fated attempt of Roger Casement and cohorts to land arms at Banna Strand to aid the Easter Rising. Casement was landed from a German submarine, just north of the harbour in the early hours of 21 April 1916, but the ship, Aud Norge, never landed at Fenit and was scuttled in Cork harbour by its German captain lest the British forces take possession of the arms cache. History repeated itself when in 1984, the Marita Ann a Fenit-registered boat, attempted a similar operation on behalf of the Provisional Irish Republican Army. They were discovered by the authorities and arrested off the coast. This operation had the present TD for Kerry North, Martin Ferris prosecuted for gun-running, convicted for the possession of explosive substances for unlawful purpose and for possession of firearms and ammunition with intent to endanger life. Ferris served 10 years in prison.

On 2 August 1922, during the Irish Civil War, Fenit was the scene of a major seaborne landing, from the ship Lady Wicklow, by 450 Free State troops, as part of a civil war offensive to re-take Kerry and the Republican-held province of Munster. The republican forces had intended to blow up the pier if an attack was launched but the charges were rendered inoperable by unknown persons in an attempt to minimise damage to the port.

== Harbour ==
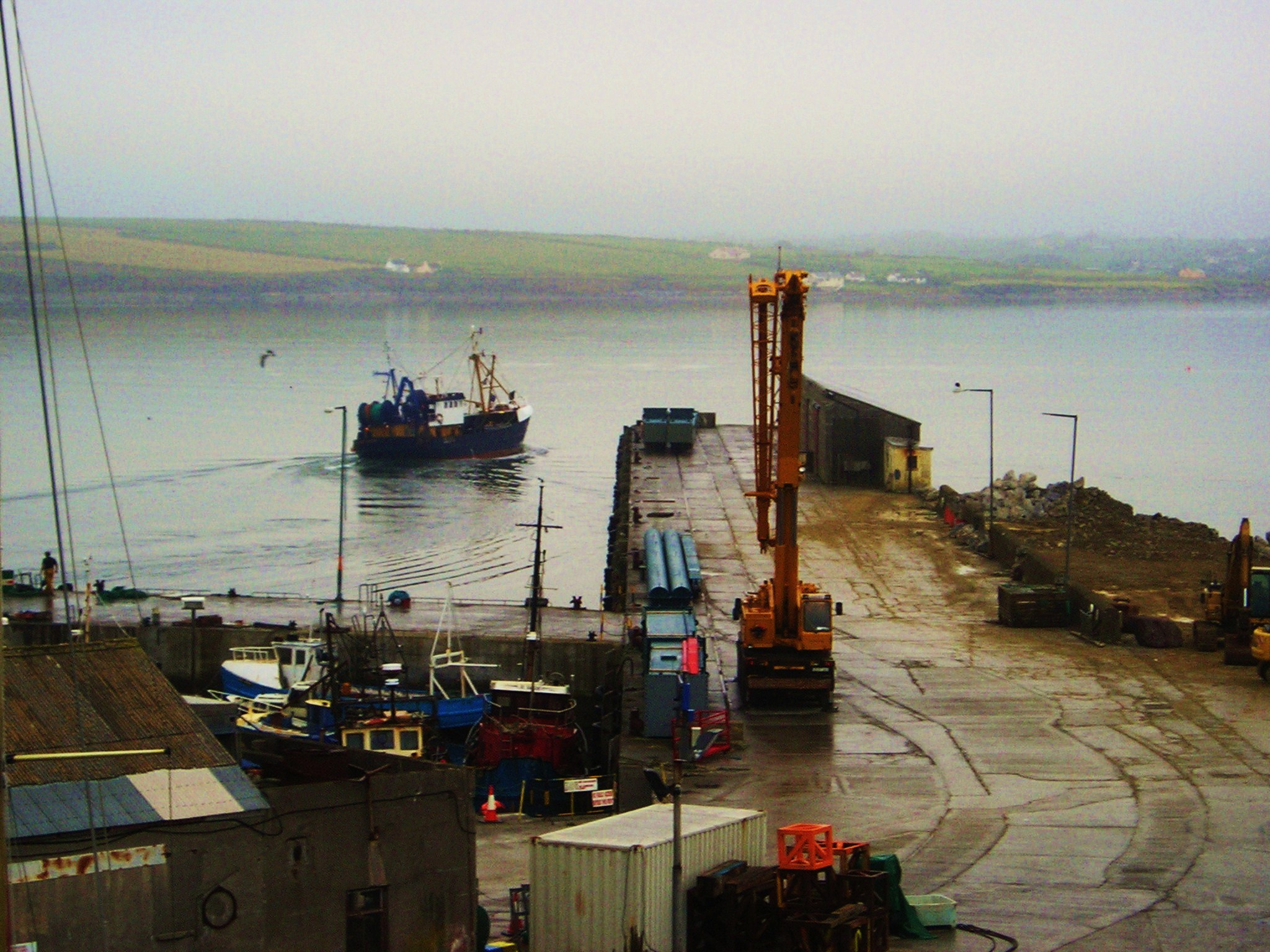
Leaving Fenit harbour

The harbour at Fenit is the most westerly commercial port of Ireland. The port is owned by the Irish state and was operated under the 1946 Harbours Act by the Tralee and Fenit Pier and Harbour Commissioners until October 2011, when it became the responsibility of the Kerry County Council. Fenit is the only commercial port between Foynes on the River Shannon and Cork. It is located between Kerry Head to the north and Brandon Head to the south. The deep water port is a major asset to County Kerry and caters for vessels up to 17,000 Dwt.

The Tralee Harbour Board was established in 1840. Commercial shipping started to use Blennerville, at the head of Tralee Bay, as the access point for the town of Tralee. Prior to this cargo for Tralee was transported through Barrow Harbour, a natural sea inlet, just north of Fenit. Barrow Harbour was, historically, the port used to service Ardfert, now a village but, in the monastic era, it was a major ecclesiastical centre with students and monks from many parts of Europe. In 1880, Fenit harbour was built and the Harbour Board took on the name "Tralee and Fenit Pier and Harbour Board".

It has served as the merchants' port for Tralee. Coal, grain timber, etc., were landed during the 20th century with oil and cranes becoming the main cargo until the fuel distribution base was dismantled in the late 1990s. The main deep sea pier is 175m long with storage facilities available. Accommodating 15,000 tonne ships, the port is mixed use with a marina, fishing and commercial ships. There are about 15 shipments per year. This is almost totally due to the export of container cranes manufactured by Liebherr's Irish subsidiary, based in Killarney, which are shipped all over the world.

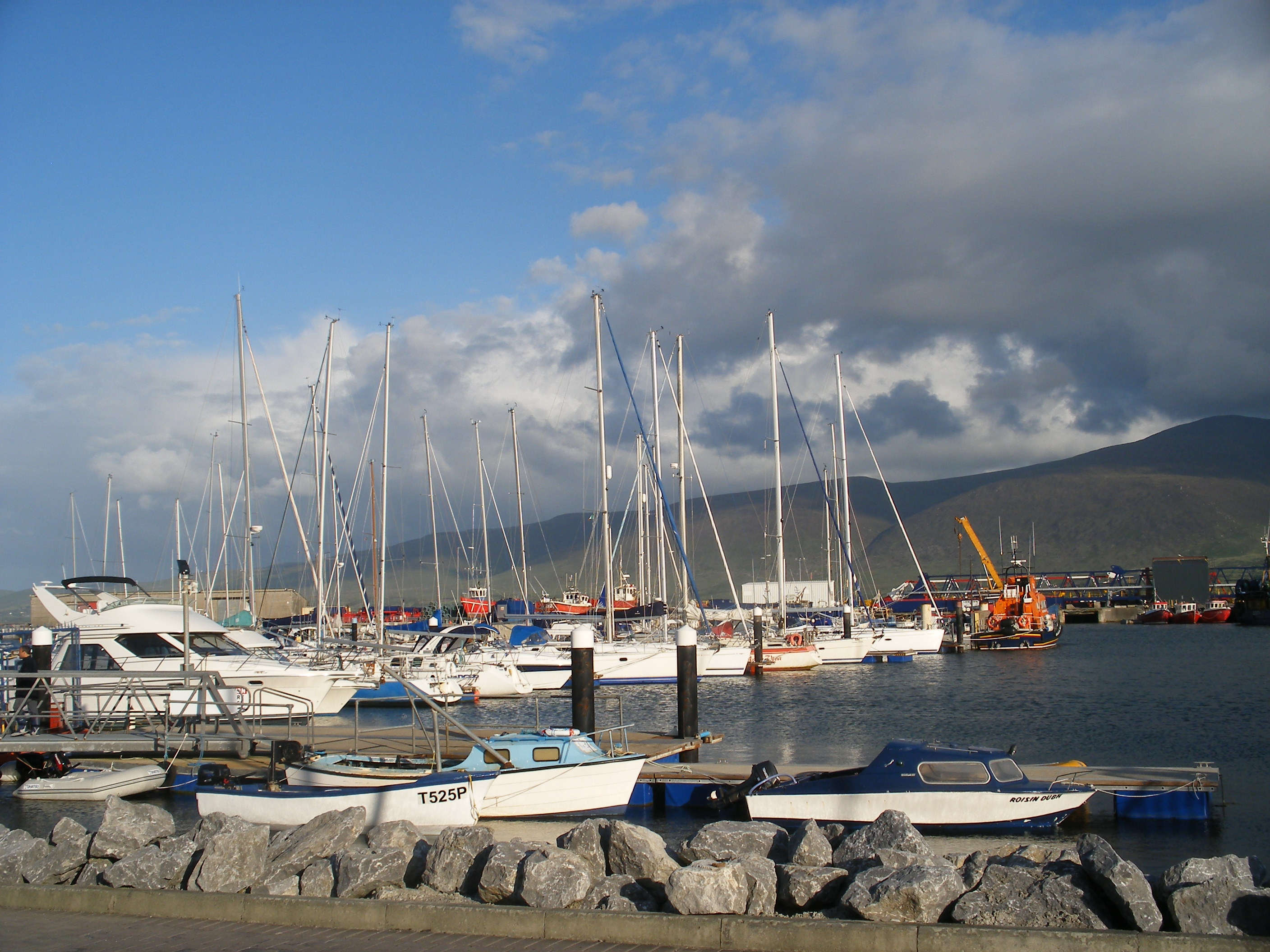
Fenit Marina

The port was a major port for landing fish in the 1970s. The local fishing industry has all but ceased due to EU quota limits and competition from larger fleets from Spain and France. Until 2006, French companies still used the port to land fish that were then transported directly to the European mainland. The oil industry has, in the past, used Fenit as a base for their supply boats on several occasions when exploring off the west and southwest coast of Ireland.

== Marina ==
Fenit Marina, built in 1997, largely with the aid of EU funding, is a 130-berth marina located at Fenit harbour and connected to the land by an 800m causeway and viaduct. The marina caters to leisure craft for boats from 6m to 15m in length with an approach depth of 5m which provides access at all tidal levels. The minimum depth of water is 3m.

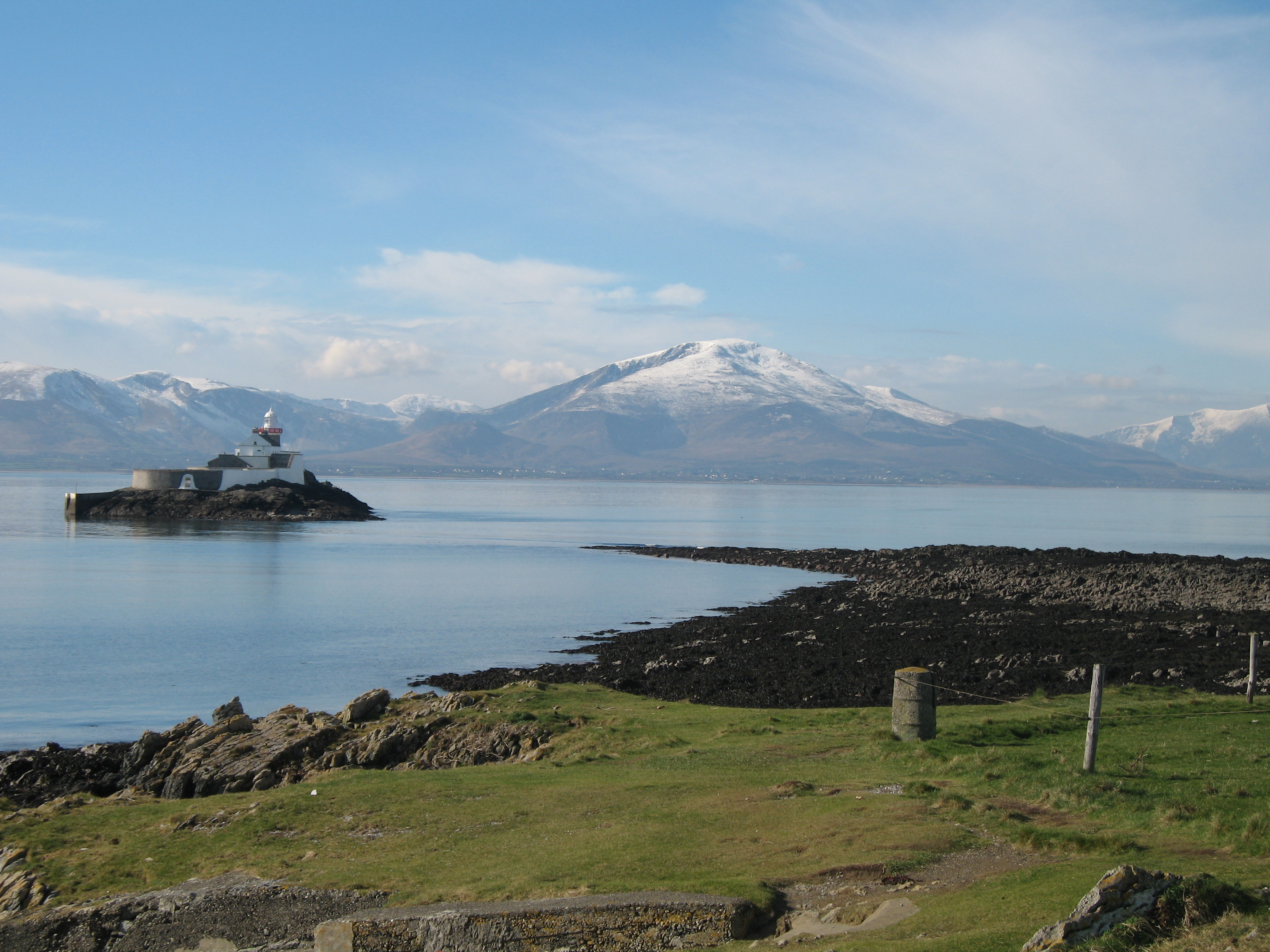
Little Samphire lighthouse

== Lighthouse ==
In 1851 a lighthouse was built on the little Samphire island, located a few hundred meters west of Fenit pier. A large bronze sculpture of Saint Brendan was erected in 2004 on Great Samphire Island, the rock around which the harbour was built.

This island has been utilised as part of the port development and its name se'Great Samphire Island' appears to refer to the height when compared to its much flatter twin, Little Samphire Island. ("Samphire" is a small flowering plant used in cookery and lends its name to the twin islands in the bay.)

== Transport ==
=== Railway ===
A railway once serviced Fenit and freight trains travelled over the viaduct to transfer freight between ship and train. In 1887 the railway line was built, but by the 1970s the service ceased. Fenit railway station opened on 5 July 1887, closed for passenger traffic on 31 December 1934 though it was still used for ad hoc day-tripper excursions from Tralee and for goods traffic until 2 June 1978.

=== Bus services ===
On Fridays Bus Éireann route 278 provides two journeys from Fenit to Tralee and one return journey. CIÉ used to operate three buses per day in and out of Fenit in the 1980s. Bus services are virtually non-existent and primarily service the school-going populace during term time.

=== Road network ===
The R551 and R558 roads lead to Tralee. Kerry Regional Airport is approximately thirty minutes away. Both Shannon and Cork airports take about a two hours car journey.

=== Greenway ===
Since October 2022, the 11.2 km Tralee–Fenit Greenway connects Fenit with Tralee following the route of the disused railway line.

== List of craft associated with Tralee Bay ==
- Saint Brendan's Sailing Boat(s): North America reached by Irish sailors prior to Vikings and Christopher Columbus
- Nuestra Señora del Socorro: Ship from Spanish Armada arrested in Tralee Bay
- Jeanie Johnston – original: Tralee-owned emigrant ship, mid-19th century
- The SS Libau – a German ship sailing under the name Aud which carried guns for 1916 revolution
- HMS Bluebell: British warship used to arrest "Aud Norge"
- U-19: German U Boat that brought Roger Casement to Ireland
- SS Lady Wicklow: Merchant ship used by Irish Free State Army to land troops on Fenit Pier
- Nonoalca: Small yacht sailed singlehanded from America.
- MV Valhalla: Merchant ship used in attempt to bring arms from USA to Fenit
- Marita Ann: Fenit trawler used in attempt to land arms from USA
- LE Deirdre: One of three Irish Navy ships used to prevent landing of arms at Fenit
- LE Emer: One of three Irish Navy ships used to prevent landing of arms at Fenit
- LE Aisling: One of three Irish Navy ships used to prevent landing of arms at Fenit
- Jeanie Johnston – reconstruction: Reconstruction sailing ship built in Blennerville, Tralee and Fenit

== Other features ==
Fenit Castle, a tower house, was built in the 16th century to protect the entrance to Barrow Harbour. This was built by the FitzMaurice clan and still commands a dominant position over the surrounding landscape. Other notable buildings include the customs house, now derelict, the redbrick RIC barracks buildings, now private houses, the stone built lifeboat house that is now disused. The large estate of Fenit House and its grounds dominate the village on the shore-side of the main road into the village. Formerly the Fuller's and Hurley estate, it was built in 1910.

Tralee Golf Club had their original course situated on Fenit island at the end of the 19th century, and it now exists across the straits of Barrow Harbour, having also been located at two venues in Tralee; Mounthawk and Lis Beg, Oakpark in the interim.

Recreational angling is a common activity in Fenit, where many visitors fish from the viaduct. Tralee Bay Sea Angling Club, the largest angling club in Ireland, have their clubhouse on the marina breakwater in the harbour. Tralee Bay Sailing Club have a slipway and clubhouse building on a prominent point overlooking the harbour and bay. The local soccer team now bears the name 'Fenit Samphires', which were established in 1994. The local Gaelic football team, Churchill GAA, includes members from Fenit village, the townland of Churchill, and the adjacent village of Spa.

== See also ==
- List of marinas
- List of RNLI stations
- List of towns and villages in Ireland.
