= Patrick McCarthy =

Patrick McCarthy may refer to:

== Music ==
- Patrick McCarthy (conductor), English conductor and singer
- Pat McCarthy (music producer), record producer from Dublin, Ireland

== Politics ==
- Patrick J. McCarthy (1848–1921), mayor of Providence, Rhode Island 1907–1909
- P. H. McCarthy (Patrick Henry McCarthy, 1863–1933), labor leader in San Francisco and mayor from 1910 to 1912
- Patrick McCarthy (politician), Northern Irish politician

== Sports ==
- Pat McCarthy (cricketer) (1919–2007), cricketer for Ceylon and Western Australia
- Pat McCarthy (Welsh footballer) (1888–?), Welsh footballer
- Pat McCarthy (Gaelic footballer) (born 1950), Irish former Gaelic footballer
- Paddy McCarthy (born 1983), Irish footballer, currently playing for Crystal Palace
- Patrick McCarthy (Australian footballer) (born 1992), footballer for Carlton in the Australian Football League
- Patrick McCarthy (footballer, born 1871) (1871–1963), Irish footballer, boxer, referee, and sports teacher
- Patrick McCarthy (rugby union) (1893–1976), New Zealand international rugby union player
- Patrick McCarthy (martial artist) (born 1954), Canadian martial artist

== Others ==
- Patrick McCarthy (judge) (born 1952), Irish judge and former barrister
- Patrick M. McCarthy (surgeon), American cardiac surgeon
- Patrick M. McCarthy (lawyer), American lawyer and United States Navy officer
- Patrick McCarthy (publisher) (1951–2019), W magazine publisher

== See also ==
- Pat McCarthy (disambiguation)
