= Pat McCarthy =

Pat McCarthy, short for Patrick McCarthy, Patrice McCarthy or Patricia McCarthy, may refer to:

== Sports ==
- Pat McCarthy (Welsh footballer) (1888–?), Welsh footballer
- Pat McCarthy (cricketer) (1919–2007), cricketer for Ceylon and Western Australia
- Pat McCarthy (Gaelic footballer) (born 1950), former Gaelic footballer
- Pat McCarthy (netball) (born c. 1933), former Australia netball international

== Others ==
- Pat McCarthy (politician), American politician from the state of Washington
- Pat McCarthy (record producer), record producer from Dublin, Ireland

== See also ==
- Patti McCarty (1921–1985), American actress
- Patrick McCarthy (disambiguation)
