= Dunbrody =

Dunbrody may refer to:

- Dunbrody (1845), a barque built in Quebec in 1845 and wrecked in 1875
- Dunbrody (2001), a replica of the original, built in Ireland in 2001
