= Tralee Bay =

Bay in County Kerry, Ireland

Coordinates: 52°17′N 9°56′W

Designations

Ramsar Wetland
- Designated: 10 July 1989
- Reference no.: 440

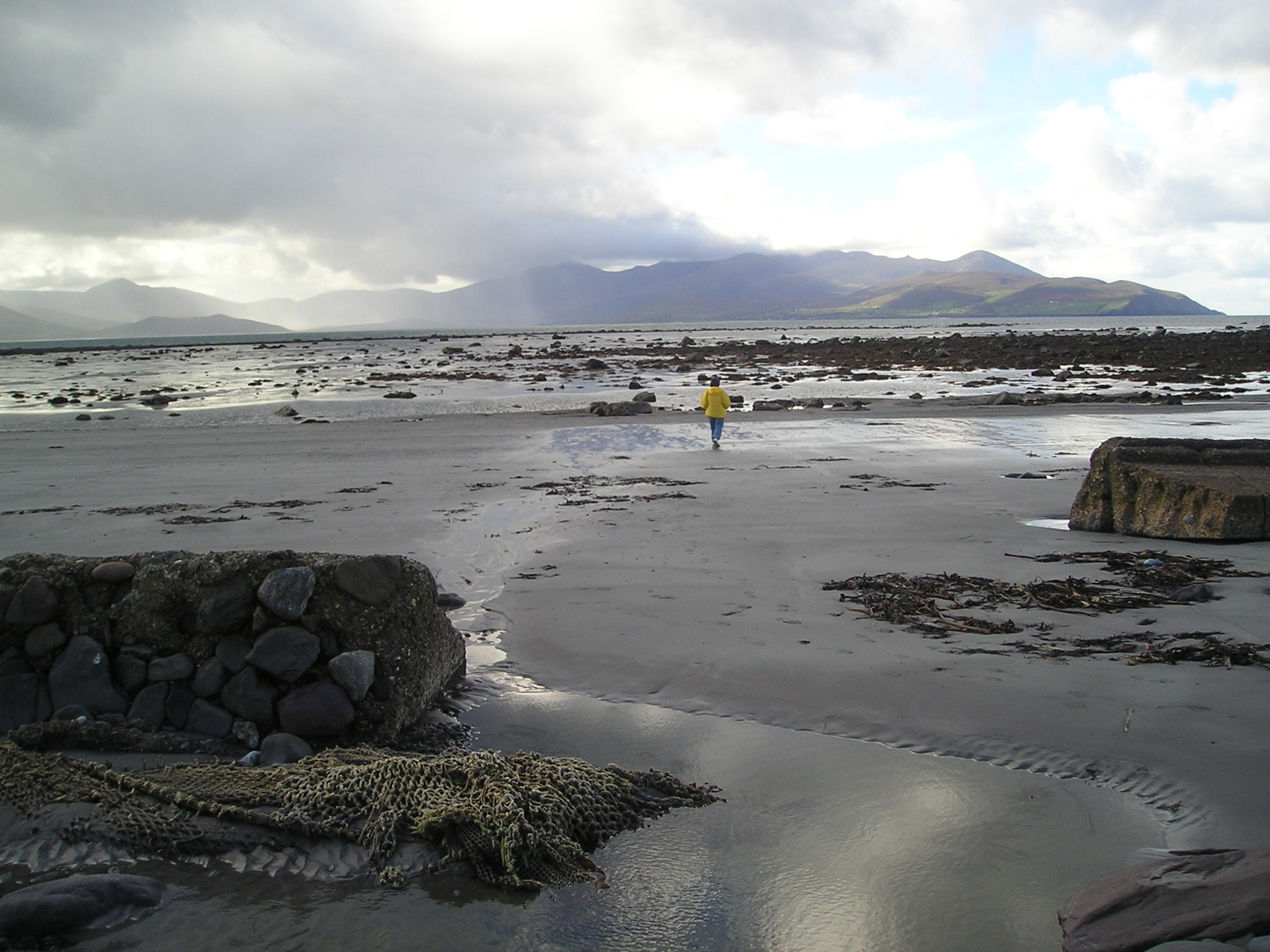
Tralee Bay in 2004, looking towards Mount Brandon.

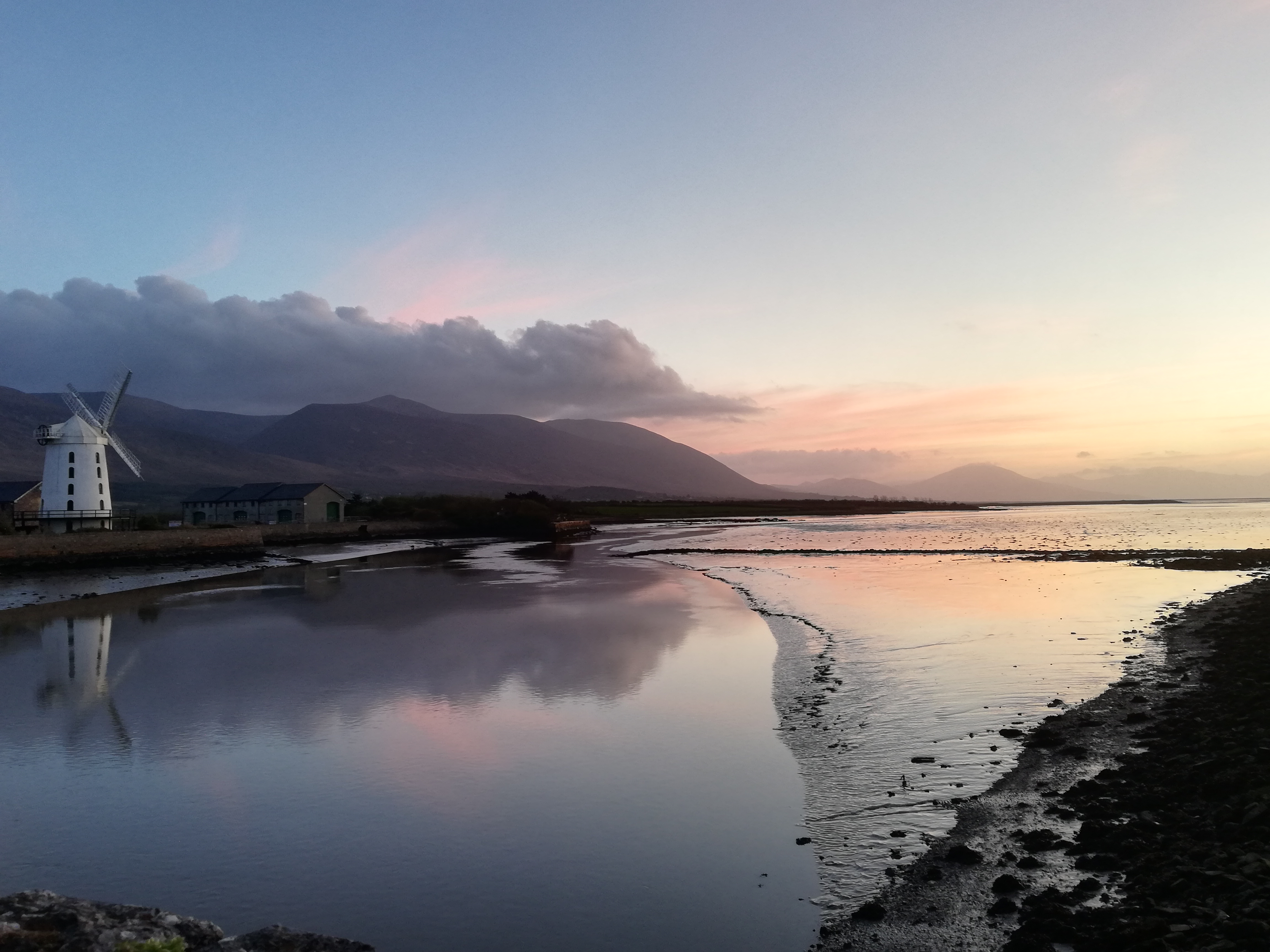
Tralee Bay

Tralee Bay (Irish: Loch Foirdhreamhain / Cuan Thrá Lí) is located in on the west coast of County Kerry, Ireland. It is situated between Kerry Head on the north side and the Maharees on the west and extends eastwards as far as the bridge at Blennerville. Several small rivers feed into the bay through the town of Tralee. Villages around the bay include; Ballyheigue, Fenit, Kilfinora, Spa, Blennerville, Camp and Castlegregory.

== General information ==
The hinterland of Tralee Bay is rich in historic content covering most major eras in the origins and development of the Island and the Nation, from the mythological history, social and industrial development to relatively recent political evolution. In conjunction with Barrow Harbour, the following list of people, items, places and events are indicative and relevant;

- Scotia's Grave
- Cathair Cun Ri
- Ring Forts or Raths
- Sou Terrains
- Spa
- Blennerville
- Blennerville Windmill
- Saint Brendan
- Tralee Ship Canal
- Spanish Armada
- Ardfert Cathedral
- Roger Casement
- Jeanie Johnston
- Civil War
- Aud
- Bee Hive Huts
- Fenit Harbour
- Irish Lights
- RNLI
- Maharee Islands
- Dingle Peninsula
- Liebherr Container Cranes
- Oyster Beds
- Bird Sanctuary
- Fenit Viaduct
- Fenit Railway Station and Branch Line

== Maps and charts ==
- Ordnance Survey of Ireland, Discovery Series Map ref No. 71 Kerry. Scale 1:50,000
- British Admiralty Navigation Chart Ref No. 2739. Scale = 1:37,500.

== Place names and features ==
Generally, clockwise from Kerry Head;

- Kerry Head
- Ballyheigue Pier
- Ballyheigue
- Blackrock
- Banna Strand
- Illaunnabarnagh (rock)
- Mucklaghmore rock
- Illaunnacusha, rock
- The Rose rock
- Barrow Golf Links
- Fenit Island
- Barrow Harbour
- Little Samphire Island
- Samphire Lighthouse
- Wheel Rock
- Black Rock
- Spa
- Tralee Ship Canal
- River Lee from Tralee
- Blennerville Bridge
- Blennerville Windmill
- Blennerville
- Bealathaleen Creek
- Derrymore Island
- Derrymore Strand
- Carrigagharor Point
- Aughacasla Strand
- Castlegregory
- Lough Gill
- The Trench River
- Kilshshannig point
- Illaunlea rock
- Callahangrin headland
- Mucklaghbeg rock
- Minnaun Point
- Illaunturlogh island
- Illauntannig island
- Reennafardarrig island
- Illaunboe island
- Illaunimmil island
- Inishtooskert island
- Magharee Islands or The Seven Hogs
- The Maharees
- Scraggane Bay
- Minnaun
- Illaunnanoon
- Doonagaun Island

== Items of interest ==
- A bird sanctuary is located on the south side of the bay on the low-lying land of Derrymore Island.
- Little Samphire is a low-lying rock in the Bay on which a lighthouse stands. The lighthouse, operated and maintained by the Commissioners of Irish Lights also marks the limit of the harbour area under the control of Tralee and Fenit Harbour Board.
- Great Samphire Island is a small rock in the Bay around which is built the harbour and port of Fenit. The name comes from the rather rare yellow samphire plant that grows there. A monument to Saint Brendan the Navigator is located at the apex.
- Tralee Golf Club overlooks the whole bay from an elevated position at Barrow.
- Tralee Bay Sailing Club and a Sailing School, along with Fenit Marina provide leisure boating facilities.
- Shore based angling is a popular pastime practised from the viaduct leading out to the harbour.
- Several angling boats are licensed to take recreational anglers out on the bay.
- Tralee Bay Sea Angling Club, the largest sea angling club in Ireland, has its clubhouse in Fenit Harbour.

== Vessels sunk and wrecked ==
- Integrity 13/3/1837. Lost off Brandon Head, en route from Tarbert to the Clyde.
- Audrey Anne 5/12/1998. 65 foot trawler lost off Brandon Head.
- Brothers 4/5/1841. A Dingle hooker carrying potatoes for the Protestant colony at Dingle.
- Saint Lawrence 7/2/1840. A barque went ashore at Ballyheigue Bay.
- Port Yarrock 29/1/1894. Sank in Brandon Bay, en route from Santa Rosilia, California. All 22 crew lost.

See also "http://www.irishwrecksonline.net/Lists/KerryListB.htm" for much more detailed information.

== Adjacent bays ==
Brandon Bay is the next bay to the south west and the Shannon Estuary is located to the north. Barrow Harbour is a bay located in the bay, east of Fenit Island.

== Bibliography ==
- Discovering Kerry, T.J. Barrington, 1976, Blackwater, Dublin ISBN 0-905471-00-8
- Shipwrecks of the Irish Coast, Vol 3. by Edward J Bourke.
- A Gallant Barque, by Sheila Mulcahy, Published and Printed by The Kerryman, 1999. ISBN o 946277 25 7 P
