= Tralee Golf Club =

Golf course 10km from Tralee, Ireland

Coordinates: 52.3005°N 9.8585°W

Tralee Golf Club is an 18-hole links golf course, at Barrow, near Tralee, County Kerry, Ireland.

== Overview ==
The records show that golf has been played in Tralee since 1896 in various locations such as Oakpark, Fenit, the site of the present day Austin Stack Park and most recently at a 9-hole parklands course at Mounthawk in Cahersalee all in the town of Tralee.

In October 2009, Tralee Golf Club celebrated its 25th anniversary since its move from the town of Tralee to its present location on the edge of the Atlantic Ocean at West Barrow, Ardfert, County Kerry. The course was designed by Arnold Palmer.

The course is a par 72 and measures almost 7,000 yards from the championship tees.

== History ==
The Academy Award winning film Ryan's Daughter starring Robert Mitchum and Sarah Miles had its beach scenes filmed beside the first few holes. A tower stands behind the third green overlooking the harbour and this dates back to the 1190s. A Spanish Armada ship is reputed to have run aground west of the 17th. The beach behind the 16th green and off the right of the 17th hole was where many ships ran aground, including one vessel from the Spanish Armada in 1588. The nearby Banna Strand is celebrated in song as the landing point of Sir Roger Casement in 1916.
