= Asgard II =

Sunken Irish national sail training vessel

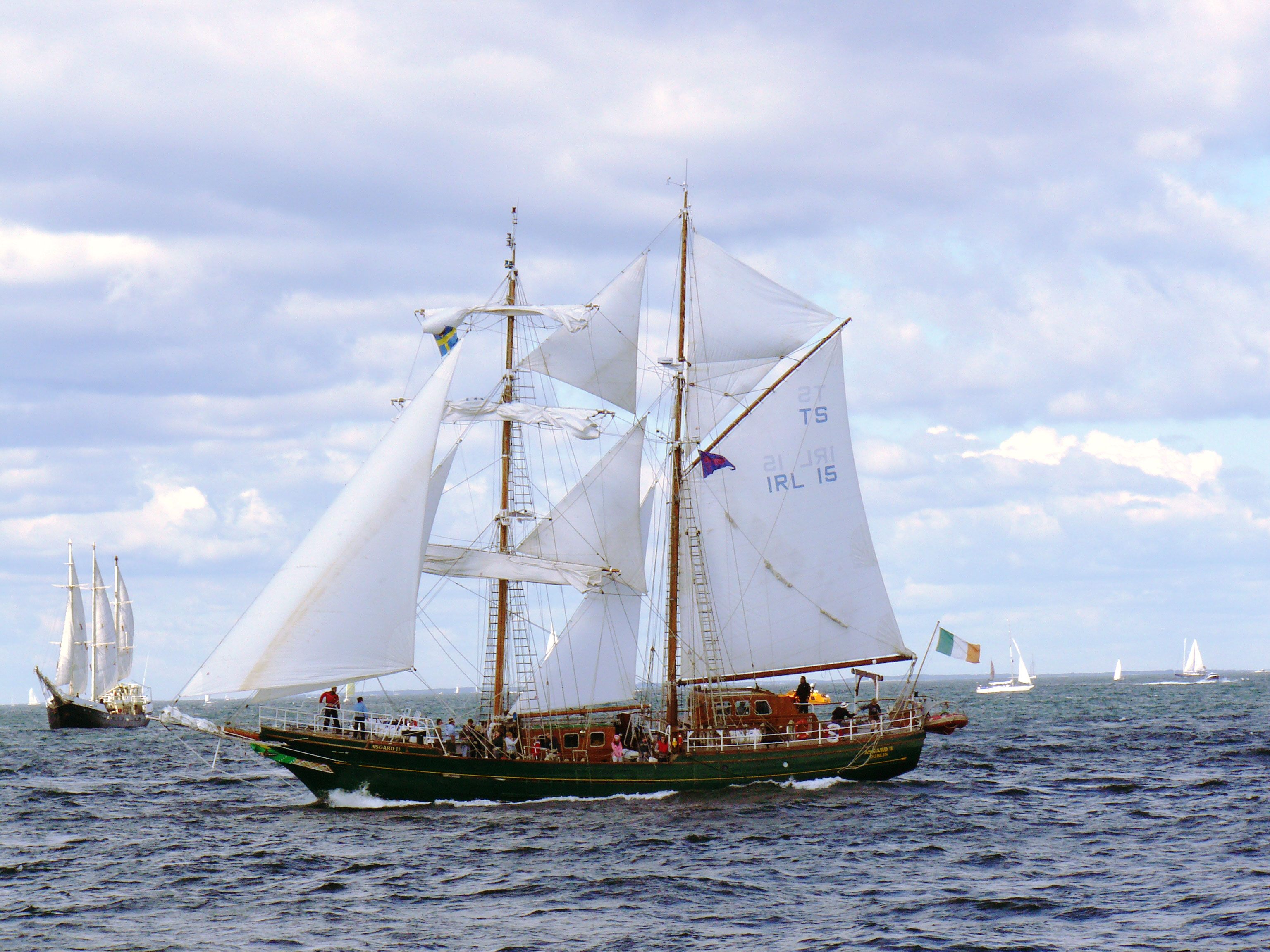

History

Ireland
- Name: Asgard II
- Operator: Coiste an Asgard
- Port of registry: Dublin, Ireland
- Builder: Arklow, County Wicklow
- Commissioned: 7 March 1981
- Identification: IMO number: 1000540; MMSI number: 250141000; Callsign: EIQJ; Official Number 402135
- Fate: Sank, 11 September 2008, Bay of Biscay

General characteristics
- Type: Sail training vessel
- Length: 26.6 m (87 ft 3 in) (overall)
- Sail plan: Brigantine

Asgard II was the Irish national sail training vessel, until she sank in the Bay of Biscay in 2008. A brigantine, she was commissioned on 7 March 1981 and purpose-built as a sail training vessel by Jack Tyrrell in Arklow, County Wicklow. She was named after the Asgard, a yacht which smuggled weapons for the Irish Volunteers in 1914.

The vessel was owned by the Irish state and operated by Coiste an Asgard (a founding member of Sail Training International). For a period of time in the early eighties, the vessel was commissioned by UCC for use in marine research. Asgard II had a traditional figurehead in the form of a carving of Granuaile.

== Sinking ==
Asgard II sank in the Bay of Biscay on 11 September 2008, 20 nautical miles (37 km) southwest of Belle-Île-en-Mer, at 47°18′03″N 3°33′02″W.

The five crew and twenty trainees had earlier abandoned the vessel after she started taking on water. Asgard II was heading from Falmouth to La Rochelle for some routine maintenance. Assistance was given by Haldoz and Arklow Venus and two lifeboats from Belle Île, Morbihan, France.

Before the end of 2008, a plan to raise the ship was put to the Irish cabinet. It was hoped that the €3.8 million costs would be paid for by the insurers, with the vessel being raised in spring 2009, given favourable conditions.

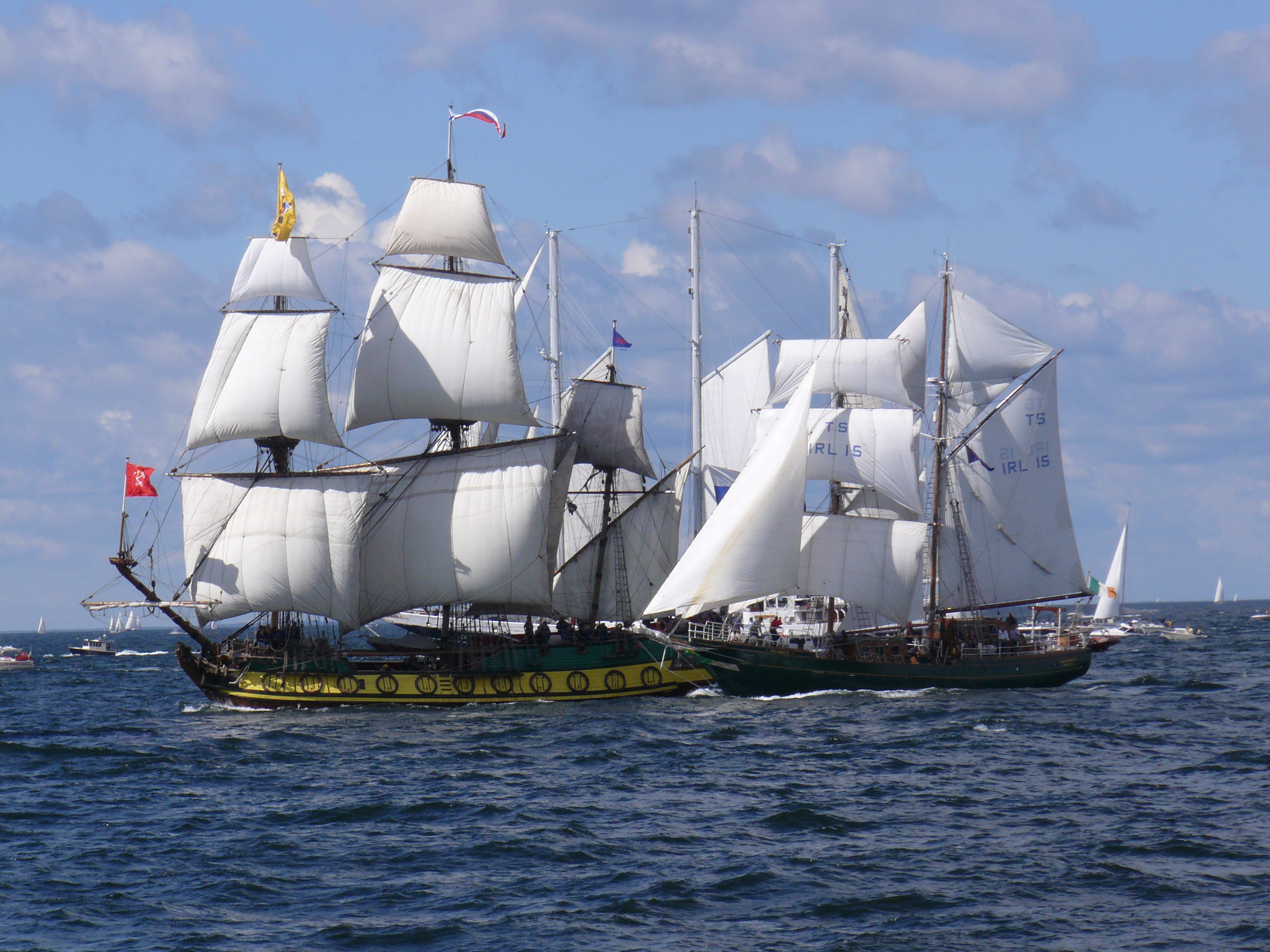
Shtandart and Asgard II in the Baltic Sea

The vessel was in a relatively good condition on the sea bed with one of her hull planks damaged; it is unclear whether this damage was caused by impact with the sea bed, or was the cause of the sinking, possibly from a collision with a semi–submerged container. She rests under 80 metres (260 ft) of water on a sandy seabed with no rocks, and she was "upright on the seabed and salvageable" in September. An early salvage was desirable before damage from winter storms and fishing nets. On 23 February 2009, the then Minister for Defence, Willie O'Dea, announced that the Asgard II would not be raised. Jimmy Deenihan, spokesperson for the opposition Fine Gael party expressed disappointment:

"It is over five months since the Asgard II sank in the Bay of Biscay. In that time any chance that the vessel would be recovered were seriously undermined by the Ministers' own hesitancy on the matter. Not one but two salvage feasibility surveys were commissioned in that period and the available weather windows were wasted when a salvage operation was possible."

In 2010, a private team of Irish divers recovered a number of artifacts from the wreck, such as the ship's bell and steering wheel.

== Investigation ==
The loss of Asgard was investigated by the Marine Casualty Investigation Board and its final report was released on 27 September 2010. The most likely cause of the accident, the investigation found, was that the ship collided with a submerged object. Although the maintenance and operation of Asgard II were found to be in excess of that required by the then-current regulations, a recommendation was made that the practice of classing sail training vessels as cargo ships rather than passenger ships should be reviewed.

== See also ==
- Dunbrody, another Irish square rigger
- Jeanie Johnston, another Irish square rigger
