= Karl Spindler (naval officer) =

German naval officer

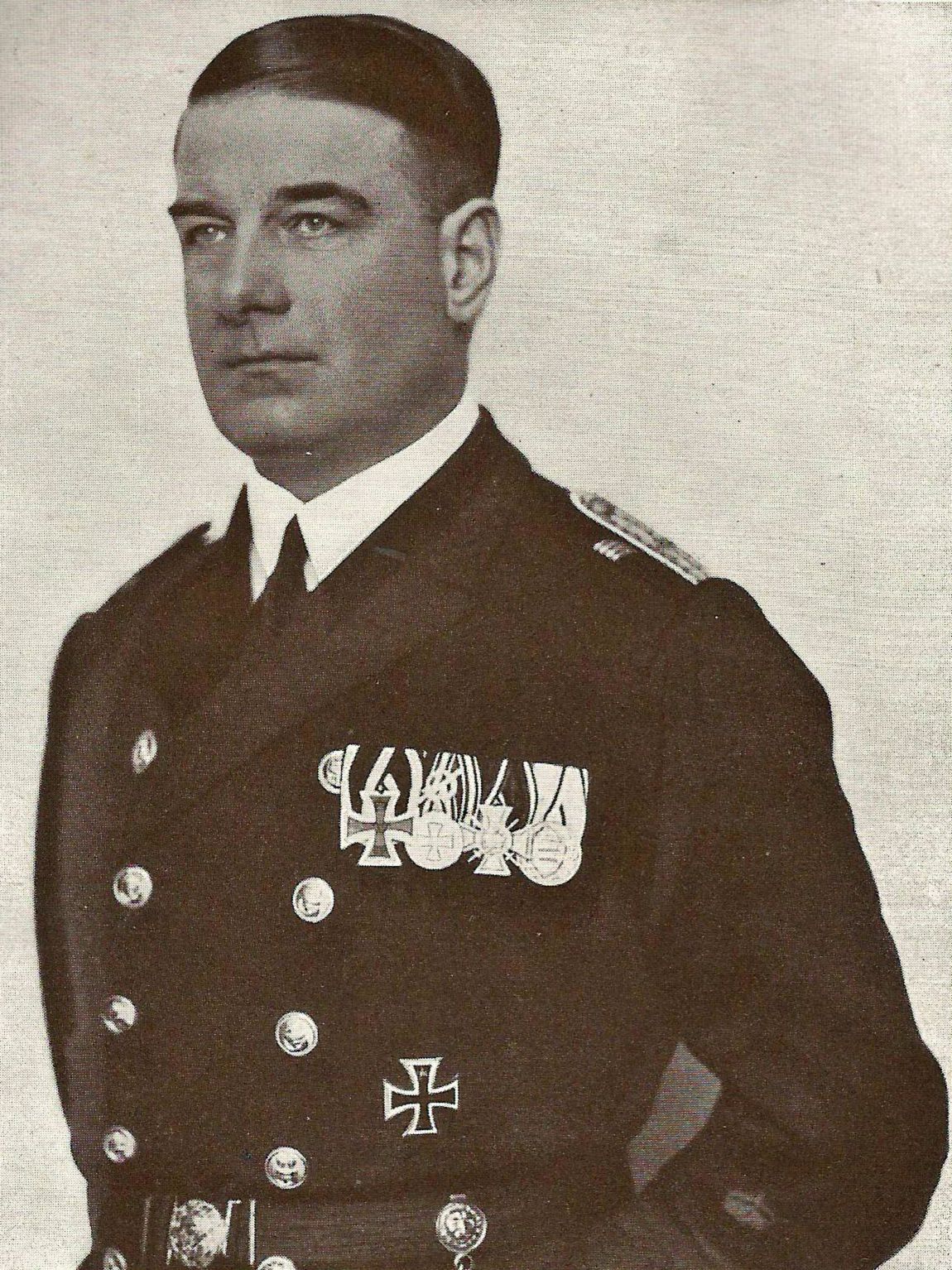
- Born: May 29, 1887; Königswinter, German Empire
- Died: November 29, 1951 (aged 64); Bismarck, North Dakota, United States
- Military career
- Allegiance: German Empire
- Branch: Imperial German Navy

Karl Spindler (1887-1951) was an Imperial German Navy officer who was involved in an arms smuggling operation intended to equip the Irish nationalists planning the Easter Rising of 1916.

== Early life ==
Spindler was born in the small town of Königswinter, near Cologne, Germany on 29 May 1887, the son of a quarry owner, Hubert Spindler, and his wife Elise (née Fuchs). At an early age Spindler decided to go to sea rather than to join the family business, serving for a period as a watch officer on a Lloyd Line steamship. He subsequently enlisted in the marine school in Bremen and the naval academy in Sonderburg (now in Denmark, but then in Germany). He served on several ships of the German Imperial Navy and at the outbreak of the Great War, he was commanding the Polarstern, a guardship for the port of Wilhelmshaven.

== Naval career ==
On 20 March 1916, Spindler was given command of a merchant ship named the Libau, falsely renamed Aud, a Norwegian freighter of similar appearance, and selected a crew of 5 officers and 22 men. The Libau was to smuggle a cargo of captured Russian weapons and a passenger, Roger Casement, a former British government official, as part of a plan to assist Irish republicans in staging what would later become known as the Easter Rising.

Spindler travelled to Berlin for further orders and met Casement. However, Casement preferred to travel onboard the submarine which would accompany the Libau. Casement was later set ashore by the submarine at Banna Strand in County Kerry via a small collapsible boat. Casement soon arrested on Good Friday, 21 April 1916, and imprisoned in the Tower of London on charges of high treason. He was subsequently found guilty and executed by hanging at Pentonville Prison on 3 August 1916.

Spindler's ship was intercepted by the Royal Navy near the Blasket Islands and forced to sail for Queenstown where there was a major British naval base. Spindler instructed his crew to open the ship's sea-valves and blow an explosive charge in the hold. As they left the sinking ship the crew took down the false Norwegian flag she was flying and hoisted the German Imperial flag in its place. They boarded two dinghies and were taken to Donington Hall as prisoners of war .

From there they briefly escaped but were recaptured the following day. Spindler was in a weakened state after several bouts of ill-health, and was transferred to the Netherlands in a prisoner exchange shortly before the end of the war.

== Literary works ==
In 1921 Spindler published a book on his involvement in the smuggling plot which was translated into English as "The mystery of the Casement ship" or "The Mystery Ship".

== Life in the United States ==
In 1931, in commemoration of the 15th anniversary of the Easter Rising, Spindler was asked by the president of the Irish committee in New York to give a lecture tour in several major US cities. His tour was organised by Irish-American groups (including IRA and other revolutionary and republican members) to demonstrate a purported bond between the Irish and Germans. He was awarded a gold medal in a commemoration ceremony in Mecca Temple, where he gave the first speech of the tour to about 4,000 people.

In California, both San Francisco and Los Angeles hosted parades for Spindler, and he was given the key to the state of California. In Boston he was given the key to the city.

== Later life and death ==
Although he made several returns to Germany to see his family, Spindler remained in the United States for the rest of his life. During World War II he was detained in an internment camp as an enemy alien, as he failed to get permanent residency or naturalization in the US. He was released in poor health at the end of the war.

Karl Spindler died on 29 November 1951 in Bismarck, North Dakota.
