= Karl Spindler =

Karl Spindler may refer to:

- Karl Spindler (novelist) (1796–1855), German novelist
- Karl Spindler (naval officer) (1887–1951), German naval officer who was involved in an attempt to bring German arms ashore in Ireland
