= Barrow Harbour =

Inlet off Tralee Bay, Ireland

Coordinates: 52.29032°N 9.84688°W

Barrow Harbour is a tidal inlet off Tralee Bay, County Kerry, Ireland. Once this was the major port for the region, servicing the monastic settlement of Ardfert and the general area of Tralee.

Barrow is overlooked by Tralee Golf Club, from which there are views of Tralee Bay and Banna Strand.

A narrow entrance to the harbour was protected by Fenit Castle on Fenit Island. The ruins of the castle still remain. Historically, a harbour chain was connected across the entrance to the harbour, which could be raised to prevent the incursion of unwelcome visitors - pirates.

Barrow House is located at the old quayside.

Together with Tralee Bay, the harbour is listed as a key biodiversity area.
