= R558 road (Ireland) =

Road in Ireland

R558 road
- Bóthar R558
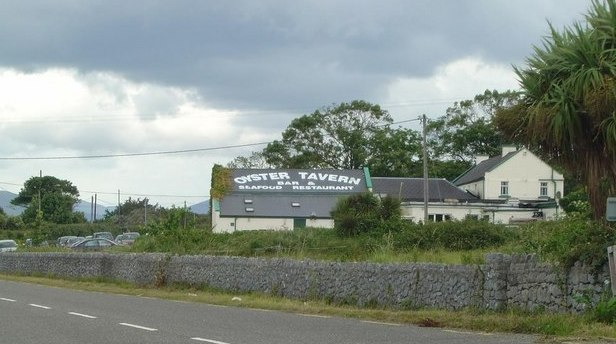
- Oyster Tavern, Spa, on the R558

Location
- Country: Ireland

Highway system
- Roads in Ireland; Motorways; Primary; Secondary; Regional

The R558 road is a regional road in Ireland, linking Tralee and Fenit in County Kerry.

== Route ==
It starts in Tralee at its junction with the R551 at Mounthawk Cross at the boundary between County Kerry and Tralee town and continues via Clogherbrien, Spa, Kilfernora and Fenit to Fenit Pier.

== See also ==
- Roads in Ireland
- National primary road
- National secondary road
