= SS Libau =

Merchant steam ship

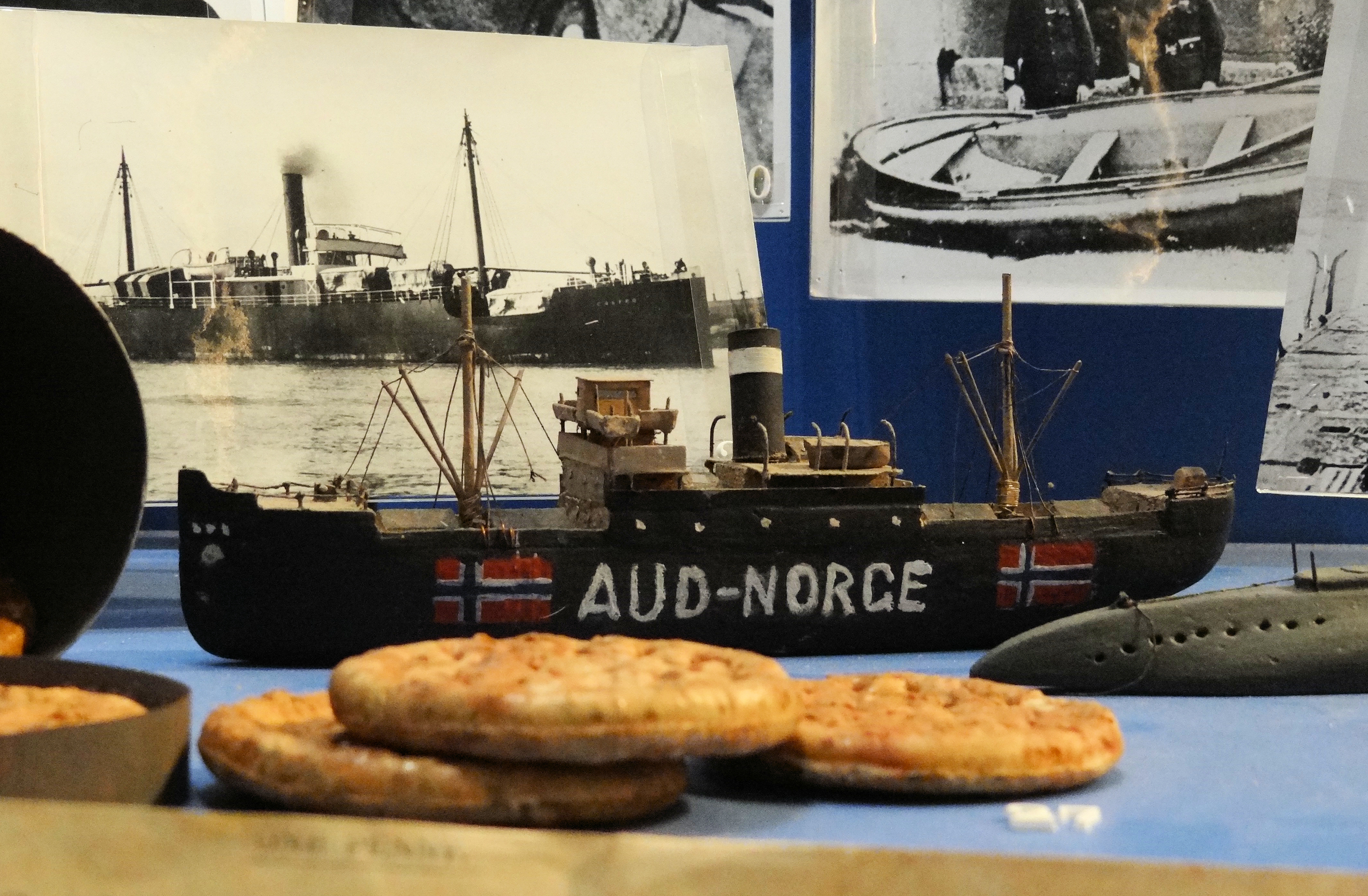
- Model of the vessel, painted in its false identity, displayed at the Cork Public Museum

History

United Kingdom
- Name: SS Castro
- Laid down: 1907
- Fate: Captured by Imperial German Navy 1914

German Empire
- Name: Libau
- Namesake: Liepāja (Libau), Baltic city
- Acquired: 1914
- Fate: Scuttled 1916
- Wreck site: Off Daunt Rock, Cork 51.71°N 8.24°W

General characteristics
- Type: Merchant vessel
- Tonnage: 1,228 GRT
- Length: 220 ft (67 m)
- Beam: 32 ft (9.8 m)
- Draught: 12 ft (3.7 m)
- Speed: 10 knots (19 km/h; 12 mph)

SS Libau (pronounced [lɪˈbaʊ]; originally known as SS Castro) was a merchant steam ship. In 1916 she was disguised with the identity of a Norwegian vessel named the SS Aud (German pronunciation: [ʔaʊ̯d]) in an attempt to carry arms from Germany to Ireland as part of the preparation for the Easter Rising.

== Vessel ==
SS Castro was a 1,062 ton steam cargo transport built for the Wilson Line of Hull, England in 1907. Castro measured 220 feet (67 m) in length with a beam 32 feet (9.8 m) and a draught of 12 ft (3.7 m). The ship was captured by the Imperial German Navy in the Kiel Canal, at the beginning of World War I in August 1914. Renamed Libau (the German name of Liepāja), she remained inactive until 1916, when designated as the vessel to carry a cargo of arms to Ireland, to aid the Easter Rising, and disguised with the stolen identity of a Norwegian vessel with a similar outline.

== Smuggling operation ==
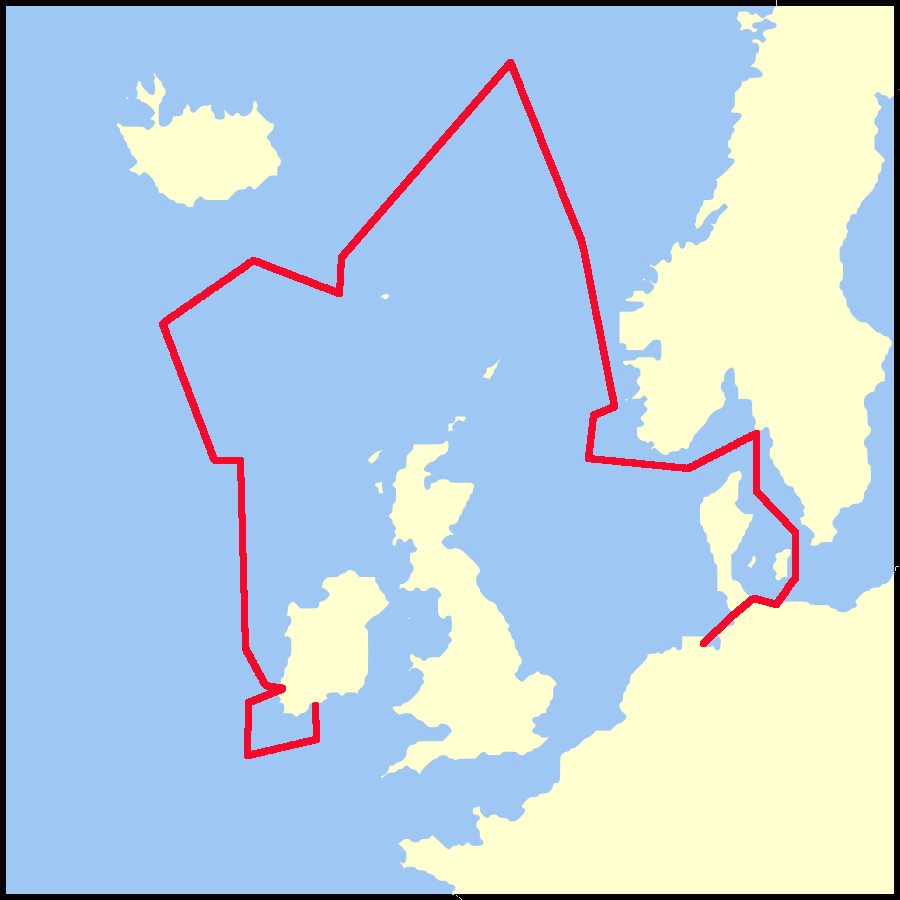
Approximate route of Libau in April 1916, via the Kiel Canal, the Arctic Circle and Rockall.

Masquerading as SS Aud, Libau set sail from the Baltic port of Lübeck on 9 April 1916, manned by a crew of 22 men under the command of Karl Spindler, bound for the south-west coast of Ireland. Libau, laden with an estimated 20,000 rifles, 1,000,000 rounds of ammunition, 10 machine guns, and explosives (under a camouflage of a timber cargo), evaded patrols of both the Royal Navy's 10th Cruiser Squadron and local auxiliary patrols. After surviving violent storms off Rockall, Libau arrived in Tralee Bay on Holy Thursday, 20 April. There they were due to meet with Roger Casement, a former government official who had negotiated the arms transfer, but as they had no radio on board the ship, they were unaware that the IRB contacts in Kerry had been told to meet the ship on Easter Sunday off Fenit pier.

On Good Friday, 21 April, the Libau, whose true identity had been uncovered by the authorities, was approached by three Royal Navy destroyers and attempted to leave the area, but was cornered. Captain Spindler allowed his ship to be escorted towards Cork Harbour, in the company of the Acacia-class sloop HMS Bluebell. The German crew then scuttled the ship to keep the weapons from falling into British hands. Spindler and crew were interned for the duration of the war.

Although Casement had been landed by the submarine U-19 in Banna Strand that Friday, he was captured and arrested, without ever meeting the Libau. Four months later he was tried and convicted of high treason for his involvement in the affair and subsequently executed. One of the two cars carrying Spindler's contacts had crashed into the River Laune, many miles away, at Ballykissane pier, Killorglin (resulting in the death of three of the four occupants of the car). So there had never been any possibility of a successful organised transfer of arms.

== Artefacts ==
=== Rifles ===
Several rifles were recovered from Libau before the vessel was scuttled. Several examples exist in various museums in Britain and Ireland. Among these are the Cork Public Museum in Fitzgerald's Park in Cork, a museum in Lurgan County Armagh, the National Museum of Ireland in Dublin, and the Imperial War Museum in London. A number of rifles recovered from the Libau, ammunition, port holes and other original artifacts form part a permanent exhibition on Spike Island in Cork Harbour, near where the Libau was scuttled and the crew of the Libau were held for a short time. Two Irishmen engaged in the gunrunning activity, Austin Stack and Con Collins, were also held on the island after capture. The exhibition also includes a working version of the Mosin–Nagant rifle, large maps of the route taken, an image of Roger Casement on board the submarine that carried him to Ireland, and video taken of the wreck of the Libau as it sits on the sea bed, filmed in the 2000s. The majority of the rifles are the model known as the Mosin–Nagant M1891, or "three-line rifle", captured in the German rout of Russian forces in the Battle of Tannenberg.

The different calibre of these rifles meant they were not attractive for issuing to German troops, for logistical reasons, and through the misunderstanding of this point they have since been widely described as 'outmoded and out of date.' In actuality, the Allies manufactured a great quantity of the rifles during the First World War. A slightly modified (M91/30) version continued to be used by European national armies through World War II and beyond.

The Mosin–Nagant was a magazine rifle, enabling the user to pre-load five rounds from a clip plus, if needed, one more in the breech, and then fire accurately in reasonably rapid succession, using relatively modern .30 calibre (7.62×54mmR) spitzer-nosed bullets. Per Russian preference, the rifles aboard Libau were equipped with the Russian model of socket bayonets, s.c. "Rat-tails".

=== Anchors ===
In 2012, a licensed salvage operation raised Libau's anchors from the wreck site outside the entrance to Cork Harbour at Daunt Rock. Following conservation and desalination works, the anchors were put on public display.

== Further sources and reading ==
- de Courcy Ireland, Dr John (1966). The Sea and the Easter Rising. Dublin: Maritime Institute of Ireland.
- Xander Clayton: AUD, Plymouth (GAC) 2007, ISBN 978-0-9555622-0-4
- Spindler, Karl; Montgomery, W.; McGrath, E.H. (1921). Gun Running for Casement in the Easter Rebellion, 1916. London: Collins.
