= Spa, County Kerry =

Spa An Spá (Irish)
- Village
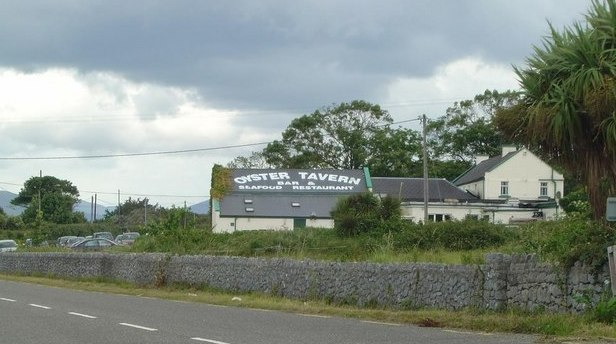
- Oyster Tavern seafood restaurant, Spa, County Kerry

- Location in Ireland
- Coordinates: 52°16′48″N 9°47′6″W
- Country: Ireland
- Province: Munster
- County: Kerry

Population (2016)
  - Total: 443
- Time zone: UTC+0 (WET)
  - Summer (DST): UTC-1 (IST (WEST))

Spa (Irish: An Spá) is a village in County Kerry, Ireland. It is located on the R558 regional road between Tralee and Fenit, overlooking Tralee Bay. Spa lies in the historical barony of Trughanacmy.

Spa is classified as a built up area by the Central Statistics Office, and had a population of 443 people as of the 2016 census. As of the 2020 school year, Spa's national (primary) school had an enrollment of 212 pupils. The local Gaelic football club is Churchill GAA.
