= Phil McCarthy =

Irish Gaelic footballer

Phil McCarthy was a Kerry senior Gaelic football player in the late 1940s and early 1950s.

Hailing from Baltygarron in The Spa (Tralee), McCarthy played his club football with Churchill. He played at full-forward for Kerry in league and championship games between 1944 and 1950. During the 1940s, Kerry won 3 All Ireland football finals and lost 2 - including the "famous" final against Cavan held in New York in 1947.

When his playing days ended, McCarthy was heavily involved in the development of under-age teams with his club, Churchill, for many years both in training and taxiing under-age players to games all over North Kerry.

McCarthy's nephew, Pat McCarthy, was also a senior Kerry footballer in the 1970s; and his own son, Philip McCarthy, represented Kerry at junior level in the 1980s.
