= Kerry Head =

Headland in County Kerry, Ireland

Coordinates: 52.41331°N 9.94400°W

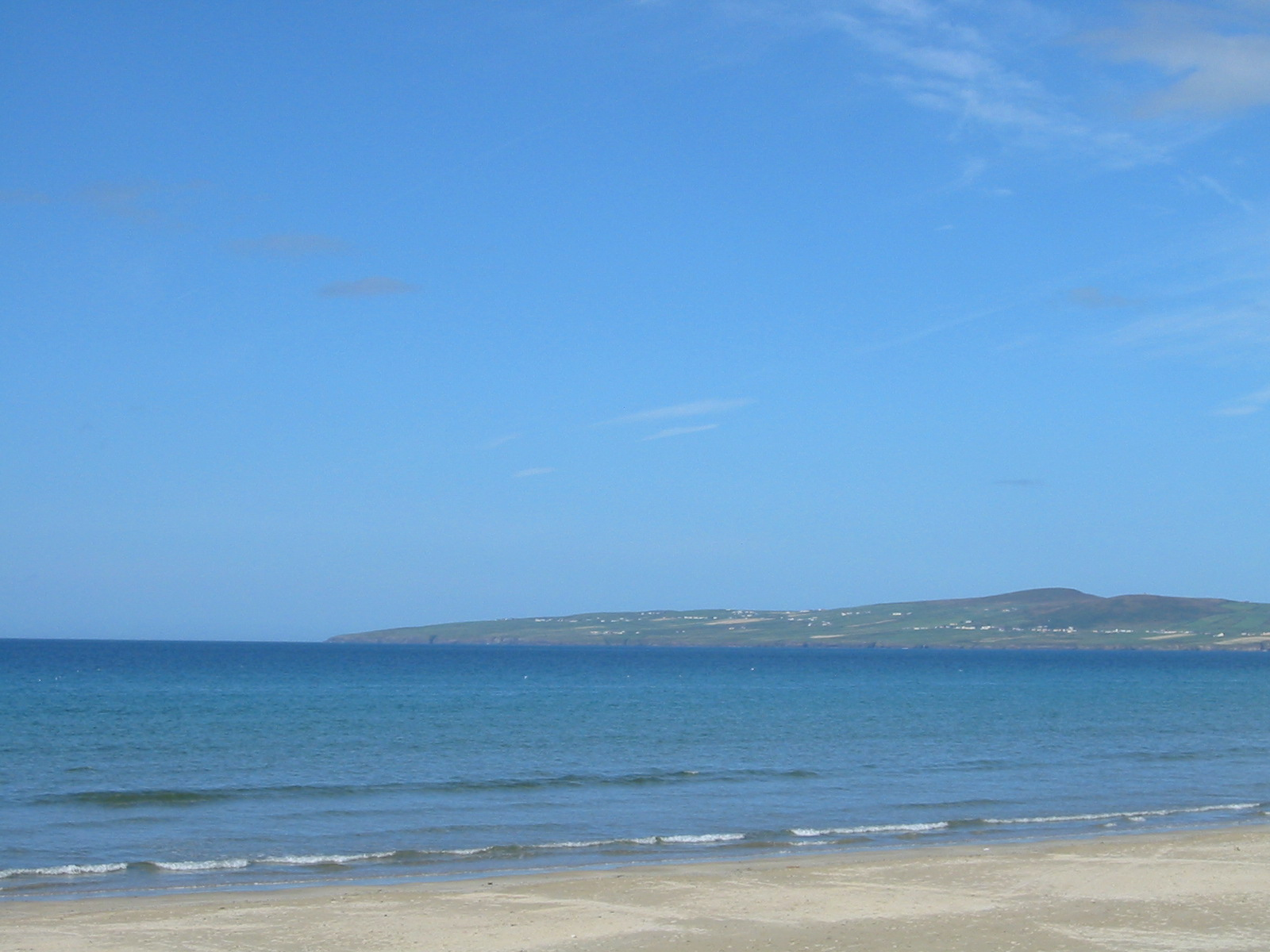
Kerry Head

Kerry Head is a headland located in County Kerry, Ireland that stretches into the Atlantic Ocean just north of Banna Strand. On the southern edge of the headland sits Ballyheigue.

Kerry Head separates the Shannon Estuary, on the north side, from Tralee Bay on the south side. Dolphin-watching is possible from the areas around Kerry Head.

The headland is also one of the points marking the extent of Shannon Foynes Port, the port on the estuary.
