= SS Aud =

Norwegian steamboat

History

Norway
- Name: Aud
- Namesake: Aud the Deep-Minded (Ketilsdóttir)
- Operator: J. Kuhnle, Jr., Bergen
- Builder: Bergen Mekaniske Verksted, Bergen
- Completed: 1907
- Homeport: Bergen
- Fate: Sunk 30 November 1916

General characteristics
- Type: Collier
- Tonnage: 1,102 GRT
- Length: 69.8 m (229 ft)
- Beam: 10.7 m (35 ft)
- Draught: 4.9 m (16 ft)
- Propulsion: triple expansion, two boilers, 106 PS (105 hp)

SS Aud was a 1,102 gross register tons (GRT) Norwegian steamboat, built in 1907 in Bergen, Norway, by Bergen Mekaniske Verksted for J. Kuhnle, Jr. During World War I, she was stopped and searched on 30 November 1916 by SM UB-18 at 50°19′N 5°33′W when sailing from Cardiff, Wales, to Lisbon, Portugal, with a load of coal. UB-18′s commanding officer, Claus Lafrenz, declared the cargo contraband and sank the ship after putting the crew in the lifeboats. Captain Andreas Stehen and his men were later picked up by the Spanish steamer SS Alu Mendi, home-ported at Bilbao, Spain, which had also been stopped and searched by UB-18 but released. They returned to Norway unharmed.

In April 1916, the German steamer Libau posed as the neutral Aud when delivering a cargo of rifles for the Easter Rising in Ireland.
