= Dunbrody (1845) =

Coordinates: 52°23′38″N 6°56′53″W

The Dunbrody was a three-masted barque built in Quebec in 1845 by Thomas Hamilton Oliver for the Graves family, merchants from New Ross in Wexford.

She operated primarily as a cargo vessel, carrying timber and guano to Ireland.

== Passenger service ==
She was fitted with bunks and between April and September from 1845 to 1851, she carried passengers on the outward leg to North America. These passengers were people desperate to escape the Great Famine of Ireland at the time, and conditions for steerage passengers were tough.

An area of six foot square was allocated to up to 4 passengers (who might not be related) and their children. Often 50% died on passage (they were known as "coffin ships"). However, the mortality rate on the Dunbrody was exceptionally low, no doubt due to her captains, John Baldwin and his successor John W. Williams, with passengers writing home often praising their dedication. On one passage with 313 passengers, almost twice her normal complement, only 6 died.

== Disposition ==
In 1869, after 24 years of service with the Graves family, she was sold. In 1874, while travelling from Cardiff to Quebec, she ran aground in the Saint Lawrence River. She was bought by a salvage company, repaired and sold again but in 1875 she foundered on the Labrador coast and was lost.

== See also ==
- Jeanie Johnston
- Dunbrody (2001), a replica ship constructed.
- Cian T. McMahon, The Coffin Ship: Life and Death at Sea during the Great Irish Famine (NYU Press, 2021)
