= Churchill GAA =

Gaelic Athletic Association club in County Kerry, Ireland

Churchill
- Cnoc na hEaglaise
- Founded: 1981
- County: Kerry
- Colours: Green & Black
- Grounds: Churchill, Spa, County Kerry
- Coordinates: 52°16′29.79″N 9°47′03.39″W

Playing kits
Standard colours

Churchill GAA is a Gaelic Athletic Association club based near Spa outside Tralee in County Kerry, Ireland. They play in Division 1 of the county league and in the Kerry Junior Football Championship. All-Ireland medal winner Pat McCarthy previously played for the club. Churchill fields both women's and men's teams.

== Honours ==
- Munster Junior B Football Champions (1): 2009
- Kerry Novice Football Championship (2): 1972, 2009
- Kerry Premier Junior Football Championship Runners-Up 2026
- St. Brendan's District Senior Football Championship (1): 1985

== Notable players ==
- Martin Ferris
- Pat McCarthy
- Seamus Daly
