= Dunbrody (2001) =

Coordinates: 52.393841°N 6.947947°W

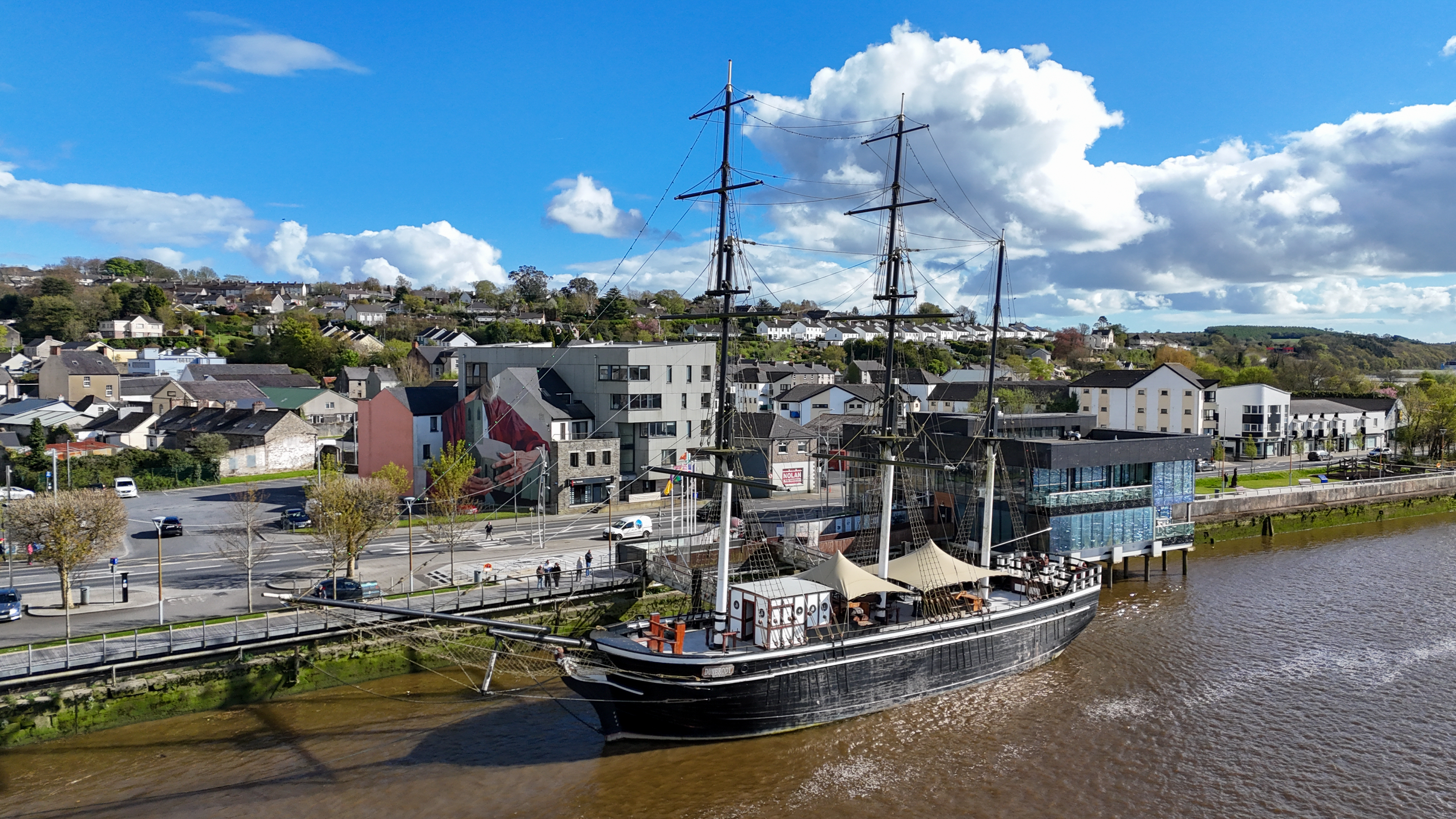
- Dunbrody at New Ross

History

- Name: Dunbrody
- Builder: J F Kennedy Trust
- Launched: 11 February 2001

General characteristics
- Displacement: 458 tonnes (451 long tons)
- Length: 53.7 m (176 ft 2 in) o/a; 36.6 m (120 ft 1 in) w/l
- Beam: 8.5 m (27 ft 11 in)
- Draft: 3.5 m (11 ft 6 in)
- Sail plan: Barque, sail area 940 m^{2} (10,100 sq ft)

Dunbrody is a three-masted barque built in New Ross between 1997 and 2001 by the Kennedy Trust. The build team involved participants of FAS community and unemployment schemes working with a core group of experienced shipwrights. The Trust refurbished a derelict dry dock for the construction.

== Background ==
Due to a funding pause the final fit-out including production of the standing and running rigging, deckhouse, interior, electrics and plumbing was done by the German company navcon.naval consulting GmbH. The ship was converted to a Lloyd's Register approved passenger sailing vessel in 2006 by the German company Neptun Peenemuende GmbH. For this two main engines, a bow thruster, watertight bulkheads and a modern navigation system were added. The ship sailed to England twice in the following years.

The Dunbrody is a full-scale seagoing replica of the Dunbrody, launched in 1845 and wrecked in 1875.

Since May 2001 the replica Dunbrody has been open to visitors at the quayside in New Ross. Visitors can see an interactive exhibition and experience life on board an emigrant ship. There is also a large database, compiled in collaboration with the Balch Institute, of emigrants who sailed from England, Ireland, Scotland & Wales in the 19th century.

The hull was built with wood planking on wooden frames. The main deck was built from wooden planking on wooden deck beams. The rigging was done in 2001 with wooden masts, topmasts and spars with steel fittings. In 2006 the lower masts were changed to steel masts, but the Topmasts and spars remained the same.

In 2010 the engines and electronics were dismounted and the ship is now permanently moored alongside in New Ross.

== See also ==
- Jeanie Johnston
- Dunbrody (1845), the original ship
