= Fenit Island =

Island in County Kerry, Ireland

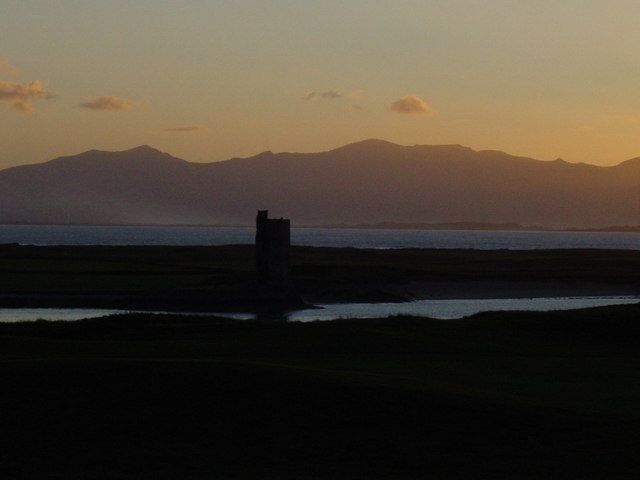
- Castle on "Fenit Within"

- Location within island of Ireland

Geography
- Location: Tralee Bay
- Coordinates: 52°17′N 9°52′W

Administration
- Ireland
- Province: Munster
- County: Kerry

Fenit Island is a populated island, on the coast of County Kerry, connected to the mainland by a sandbar. Located in Tralee Bay, the island encloses Barrow Harbour. Historically, the area was called 'Fenit Within'. It is adjacent to the areas of 'Tawlacht' and 'Fenit Without' on the mainland. The terms within/without refer to the walled protection that surrounded parts of the island from attackers from the landward side.

The island is accessible by foot along the sandbar at most times, and by car at low tide, by driving on the beach. Many old ruins exist on the island, including a castle, two churches and a graveyard. The castle is the only one of these ruins that remain visible today. It was built by the FitzMaurices in the 17th century.

Enclosing Barrow Harbour from Tralee Bay, to protect Barrow Harbour from seaborne attackers, an iron or steel chain (also known as boom) was stretched across the neck of water, between the mainland and the island near the castle.

Saint Brendan the Navigator was born on Fenit Island.
