= Pat McCarthy (Welsh footballer) =

Welsh footballer

Patrick McCarthy (born April 1888 – unknown) was a Welsh footballer. His regular position was as a forward. He was born in Abergavenny. He played for Skelmersdale United, Manchester United, and Chester.
