= Pat McCarthy (Gaelic footballer) =

Irish Gaelic footballer

Personal information
- Native name: Pádraig Mac Cárthaigh (Irish)
- Born: 1950 (age 75–76) Tralee, County Kerry, Ireland
- Height: 6 ft 0 in (183 cm)

Sport
- Sport: Gaelic football
- Position: Midfield
Clubs
- Years: Club
- 1960s-1970s 1970s-1980s: Churchill; Sallins
Inter-county*
Years	County	Apps (scores)
1975-1978	Kerry; Kildare	12 (0-3)
Inter-county titles
- Munster titles: 3
- All-Irelands: 2
- NFL: 0
- All Stars: 0
- *Inter County team apps and scores correct as of 17:39, 24 September 2011.

Pat McCarthy (born 1950) is an Irish former Gaelic footballer who played as a midfielder for the Kerry and Kildare senior teams.

A nephew of 1940s player Phil McCarthy, Pat McCarthy was a naturally strong player with excellent hands and a good jump. He was part of the Kerry Under-21 team in the early 1970s till the demise of the great Mick O'Connell and the failure of young midfield pretenders like DJ Crowley and John O'Keeffe before getting a proper chance on the senior squad under Mick O'Dwyer. McCarthy soon became the partner of Paudie Lynch. He did most of the heavier lifting at midfield many times that season. His strength maintained control against opponents who played rough or fair. McCarthy made his first championship appearance for the team during the 1975 championship and became a regular member of the starting fifteen over subsequent seasons. During this, he won one All-Ireland medal and three Munster winner's medals in four championship seasons.

McCarthy's most praiseworthy display was in the 1976 Munster final - a game regarded by many sportswriters as the best game of Gaelic football ever. Against a surprisingly determined Cork team, Kerry was at equal scores after 70 minutes. In extra time, McCarthy's strength and inspirational determination from midfield singlehandedly turned the tide for Kerry, who won out in the end by 3-20 to 2-19. However, Kerry lost by 3-8 to 0-10 to a resurgent Dublin team in that year's All-Ireland final. No doubt his being based neither in Kerry nor in Dublin did not count in his favour, as far as training was concerned. That year also saw the start of Jack O'Shea as a new midfielder for Kerry, with his future partner, Sean Walsh, also being brought in - initially as a substitute in the forward line. Nonetheless, many people felt that McCarthy deserved more senior outings for Kerry than he received from Mick O'Dwyer over subsequent seasons.

McCarthy later switched to playing his football in Kildare, club football for Sallins, and league/championship senior games for Kildare. When his playing days finished, McCarthy was involved in coaching and selector for the Kildare county team, notably for their nearly successful championship season in 1998 when they defeated Kerry in the semi-final but lost to Galway in the All-Ireland final.

At club level, McCarthy played with both the Churchill club in Kerry and later with Sallins in Kildare.

He remains a frequent visitor to Kerry, particularly to his home parish, Churchill, where his sporting achievements continue to be acknowledged locally.
