= Pat McCarthy (cricketer) =

Personal information
- Full name: Patrick Covell Derrick McCarthy
- Born: 24 October 1919; Ceylon
- Died: 23 December 2007 (aged 88); Perth, Western Australia, Australia
- Batting: Right-handed

Domestic team information
- Years: Team
- 1938-39: The Rest
- 1944-45 to 1945-46: Ceylon
- 1950-51 to 1954-55: Western Australia

Career statistics
Competition	First-class
Matches	10
Runs scored	464
Batting average	23.20
100s/50s	0/2
Top score	98
Catches/stumpings	4/–
- Source: Cricinfo, 3 October 2017

Patrick Covell Derrick McCarthy (24 October 1919 – 23 December 2007) was a Ceylon-born cricketer who played first-class cricket for Ceylon in the 1940s before moving to Australia and playing for Western Australia in the 1950s.

== In Ceylon ==
Pat McCarthy attended Royal College, Colombo, where he played in the cricket team for several years. In March and April 1936 he was a member of the Royal College team that toured Australia, the first tour of Australia by an Asian cricket team at any level of cricket. He was the team's highest scorer on the tour. He captained the team to victory in the Royal-Thomian match in March 1938.

Two weeks after the Royal-Thomian match, aged 18, McCarthy played for Ceylon in a one-day match against the touring Australians, scoring 24 batting at number four. He was one of several players from Ceylon who were invited to play for The Rest in the Bombay Pentangular over the years, appearing in the match against Hindus in 1938-39.

During World War II McCarthy served with the Ceylon Garrison Artillery from 1940 until 1946, when he was demobilised with the rank of major. He represented Ceylon in their match against the Indian touring team in 1944-45, and against the Australian Services team in 1945-46.

McCarthy worked in Ceylon as a surveyor. He played for Nondescripts Cricket Club in Colombo, scoring two double-centuries, ten centuries and over fifty half-centuries before leaving for Australia in 1948.

== In Australia ==
McCarthy played for several clubs in Perth grade cricket. He set a record for Mount Lawley which still stands when he scored 857 runs in the 1950-51 season.

He appeared for the first time for Western Australia towards the end of the 1950-51 season, scoring a "hurricane" 88 against South Australia in his second match, when he added 90 in 80 minutes for the fifth wicket with Wally Langdon. On 6 February 1954 he was batting against New South Wales at the Sydney Cricket Ground when the Duke of Edinburgh, in Australia during the 1954 Royal Visit, briefly stopped by to watch. McCarthy and his partners John Rutherford and Arnold Byfield added 61 runs in the 45 minutes in which the Duke was present, McCarthy hitting several boundaries. McCarthy was dismissed later for 98. One Sydney cricket writer described his innings as being of "almost prehistoric majesty and virility".

Upon retiring from cricket in 1960, McCarthy "returned to another of his loves – golf". He played with a handicap of three, and in 1962 he achieved a hole in one.

== Personal life ==
McCarthy married Yvonne Kelaart in Colombo in February 1942. They had two sons. Yvonne died in 1988, and Pat died in 2007.

== See also ==
- List of Western Australia first-class cricketers
