= Jeanie Johnston =

Ship; replica of a three-masted barque from 1847

Coordinates: 53°20′51.79″N 6°14′44.11″W

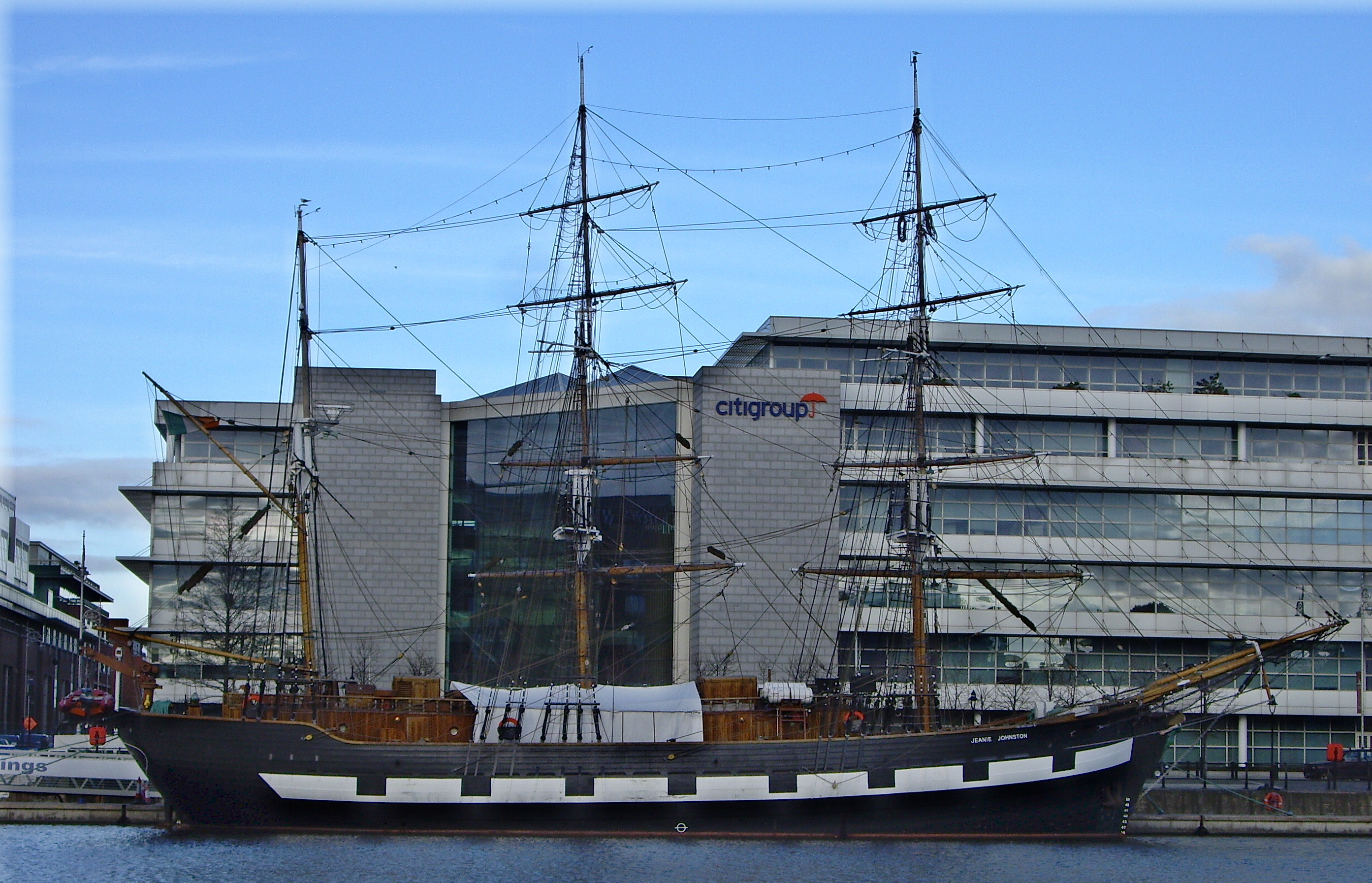
- Jeanie Johnston, moored off Custom House Quay, Dublin

History

Ireland
- Name: Jeanie Johnston
- Owner: Dublin Docklands Development Authority
- Operator: Aiseanna Mara Teoranta
- Port of registry: Tralee, County Kerry
- Builder: The Jeanie Johnston (Ireland) Company Ltd., Blennerville, Tralee
- Cost: €13.7m
- Laid down: 1998
- Launched: 6 May 2000
- Sponsored by: President Mary McAleese
- Christened: 7 May 2000
- Completed: 2002
- Maiden voyage: March 2003
- Identification: IMO number: 8633671; Call sign: EIJL; MMSI number: 250271000
- Status: Museum ship

General characteristics
- Type: Three-masted barque
- Tonnage: 301 GT
- Displacement: 518 t (510 long tons)
- Length: 47 m (154 ft 2 in) o/a; 37.5 m (123 ft 0 in) on deck
- Beam: 8 m (26 ft 3 in)
- Height: 28 m (91 ft 10 in) air draft
- Draft: 4.6 m (15 ft 1 in)
- Installed power: 2 × 106 kVA Caterpillar 3304 diesel generators; 1 × Emergency generator
- Propulsion: 2 × 290 hp (216 kW) Caterpillar 3306 diesel engines; 1 × 50 kW (67 hp) bow thruster
- Sail plan: 18 Duradon sails; 645 m^{2} (6,940 sq ft) sail area
- Endurance: Under sail: 70 days; On 1 engine: 17 days
- Crew: 40 (11 permanent and 29 voyage crew)

Jeanie Johnston is a replica of a three-masted barque that was originally built in Quebec, Canada, in 1847 by the Scottish-born shipbuilder John Munn. The replica Jeanie Johnston performs a number of functions. At sea it is an ocean-going sail training vessel; in port, it converts into a living history museum on 19th century emigration and, in the evenings, is used as a corporate event venue.

== Original ship ==
The original Jeanie Johnston was bought by Tralee-based merchants John Donovan & Sons, as a cargo vessel and traded successfully between Tralee and North America for a number of years. The trading pattern was to bring emigrants from Ireland to North America, and then to bring timber back to Europe.

=== Famine voyages ===
The ship made a voyage from County Kerry to Quebec on 24 April 1848, with 193 emigrants on board, as the effects of the Great Famine ravaged Ireland. Between 1848 and 1855, the Jeanie Johnston made 16 voyages to North America, sailing to Quebec, Baltimore, and New York. On average, the length of the transatlantic journey was 47 days. The most passengers she ever carried was 254, from Tralee to Quebec on 17 April 1852.

Despite the number of passengers and the long voyage, no crew or passenger lives were ever lost on board the Jeanie Johnston. This is generally attributed to the captain, James Attridge, not overloading the ship, and the presence of a qualified doctor, Richard Blennerhassett, on board for the passengers. This lack of mortality contrasted sharply with coffin ships that carried many other Irish immigrants.

In 1855, the ship was sold to William Johnson of North Shields in England. In 1858, en route to Quebec from Hull with a cargo of timber, she became waterlogged. The crew climbed into the rigging, and after nine days clinging to their slowly-sinking ship, they were rescued by a Dutch ship, the Sophie Elizabeth. Even in her loss, she maintained her perfect safety record.

== Replica ==
=== Construction and design ===
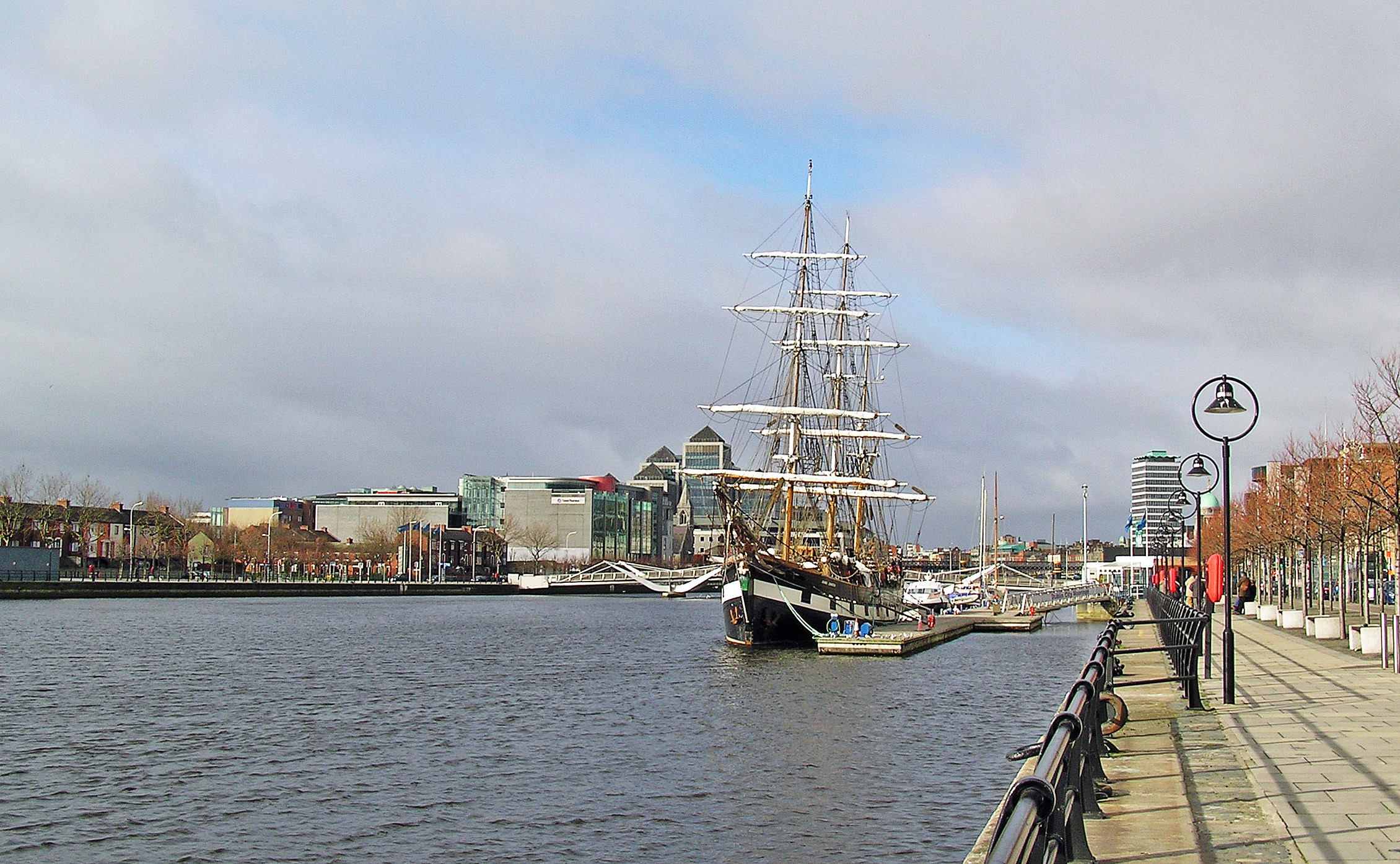
Ship Jeanie Johnston at River Liffey, Dublin, Ireland.

The project was conceived in the late 1980s, but did not become a reality until November 1993 when a feasibility study was completed. In May 1995, The Jeanie Johnston (Ireland) Company Ltd. was incorporated. The ship was designed by Fred Walker, former Chief Naval Architect with the National Maritime Museum in Greenwich, England. The recreation project was modeled closely on that of the 17th century ship, the Batavia, and the Matthew in Bristol.

An international team of young people, linking Ireland North and South, the United States, Canada, and many other countries, built the replica under the supervision of experienced shipwrights. The original cost had been projected at £4.265m sterling (~€5.8m) in 1993 and the final cost was just under €14m in 2002. The final figure includes the seagoing ship, shipyard, workshops and visitor centre at Blennerville, cost of launch, fit out at Fenit and the cost of training in shipbuilding skills provided by FÁS, the training and employment authority, to some 50 unemployed young people. The escalation in cost was attributed to the complex nature of the project, the delay in getting the project underway and completed (9 years), and the efforts made to meet an unachievable completion deadline of June 2000. The cost of the project was borne by the Irish government, Kerry County Council, Tralee Town Council, the European Union, the American Ireland Fund, Shannon Development, Kerry Group, the FÁS, and the Irish Department of the Marine, most of which later agreed to write off their losses. Over €2m was raised though private fundraising in Ireland and the United States. According to a valuation obtained by Kerry County Council in 2002, the Jeanie was then worth €1.27m. In 2015, it was valued at €150,000.

The hull of the ship was built with larch planks on oak frames. The decks were constructed from iroko and Douglas fir, with Douglas fir masts and spars.

To comply with international maritime regulations, some concessions to modernity had to be made. She has two Caterpillar main engines, two Caterpillar generators, a bow thruster for maneuverability in lakes and rivers, and an emergency generator that is located above the waterline in the forward deckhouse. She is fully compliant to the highest standards of modern ocean-going passenger ships, with steel water-tight bulkheads, down-flooding valves, and fire-fighting equipment.

A wooden plaque is mounted on the foremast listing some of the many people involved in the physical building of the ship. Many people gave time, money, and support to the project. The reconstruction efforts involved the labor of trainees from different religious and political backgrounds in Northern Ireland's disadvantaged areas who were funded by the International Fund for Ireland, the aim of the fund being to promote economic and social advance and to encourage contact, dialogue and reconciliation between nationalists and unionists throughout Ireland.

When several of the oak frames were in place and planking was being applied, the density of the oak was checked and the flotation levels estimated. These checks revealed that the ship would float higher than anticipated in the water, causing stability problems. To rectify the problem, a steel keel was attached beneath the original oak keel. This is the reason that the Jeanie Johnston draws more water than most ships of her size and cannot enter some ports the original ship would have been able to visit, such as Nantucket. However, she has proved to be remarkably stable even in the harshest weather conditions at sea. During her maiden voyage to America in March 2003, she was battered by a Force 10 storm in the Bay of Biscay and similarly on the return voyage from Newfoundland in November 2003 and prevailed unscathed.

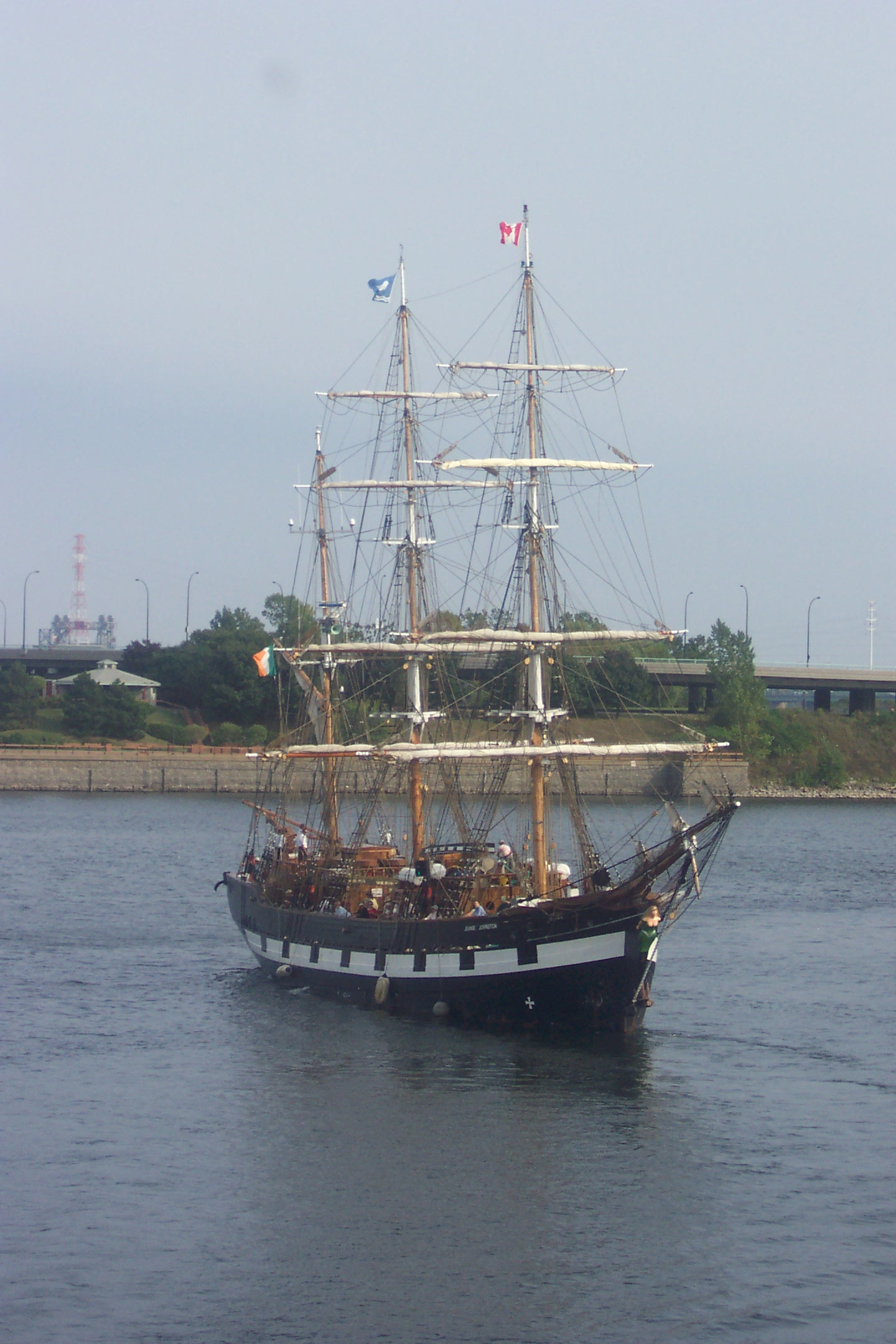
Jeanie Johnston arriving at Montréal, Québec, in September 2003.

=== Launching ===
It was originally planned to launch the ship from her shipyard in Blennerville, but a 19th-century shipwreck was discovered by marine archaeologists while a channel was being dredged. To preserve the find, on 19 April 2000, the hull of the Jeanie Johnston was hauled to the shore and loaded onto a shallow-draft barge. There she was fitted with masts and sails, and on 4 May was transported to Fenit, a short distance away. On 6 May, the barge was submerged and the Jeanie Johnston took to the water for the first time. The next day she was officially christened by President of Ireland Mary McAleese.

=== Ship history ===
In 2003, the replica Jeanie Johnston sailed from Tralee to Canada and the United States, visiting 32 US and Canadian cities and attracting over 100,000 visitors. She took part in the Tall Ships Race from Waterford to Cherbourg in 2005 and finished 60th out of 65 ships. Other notable Irish tall ships or sail-training ships are the Asgard II (lost in the Bay of Biscay in 2008), the Dunbrody, the Lord Rank (N.I.), and the Creidne (I.N.S.).

The replica is currently owned by the Dublin Docklands Development Authority, who bought it in 2005 for a reported €2.7m, which was used to clear outstanding loans on the vessel guaranteed by Tralee Town Council and Kerry County Council. From 2006 to 2008, she was operated on their behalf by Rivercruise Ireland. During that time she carried approximately 980 sail trainees and over 2,500 passengers, making regular visits to ports around Britain and Ireland, and also undertaking several trips to Spain each summer, often carrying voyage crew who intended to join the Camino de Santiago. In between these voyages she would offer day-sails in Dublin Bay.

In early 2009, the Dublin Docklands Development Authority and Rivercruise Ireland could not reach agreement. DDDA then offered the Department of Defence use of the ship as a training vessel for free (as a replacement for the sunken Asgard II), but the offer was turned down. The Department of Defence declared the Jeanie Johnston unsuitable because of her lack of speed, her required crew size of 11, and her inability to participate in tall ships races.

No alternative operator was found until mid-2010, when Galway-based company Aiseanna Mara Teoranta was appointed to operate the ship as a museum. In 2010, the ship was not in seagoing condition. In 2011, significant water damage was discovered, but repair work was not carried out until three years later, since the DDDA claims it did not have the funding to dry dock the vessel. As of 2015, another €500,000 would be required to make the ship seaworthy and suitable for training.

Running the ship as a tourist attraction costs €240,000 a year, of which €70,000 are costs of operating the ship. Dry docking and repairs cost €70,000, €40,000 is spent on maintenance, and some €30,000 on marketing. Ticket sales to 20,000 visitors in 2014 made €140,000.

=== Gallery ===
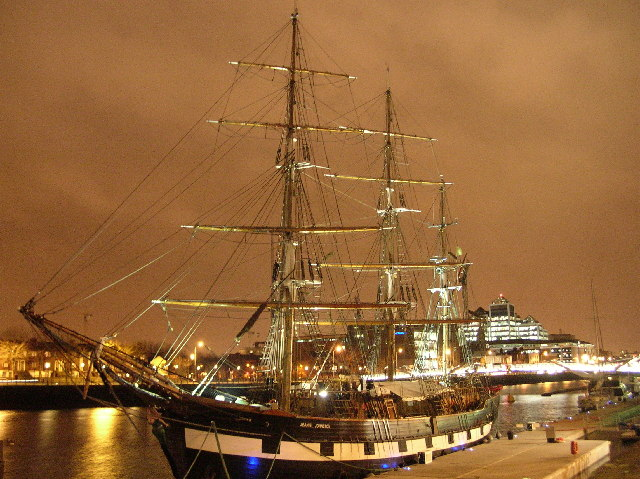
Jeanie Johnston, moored off Custom House Quay, Dublin

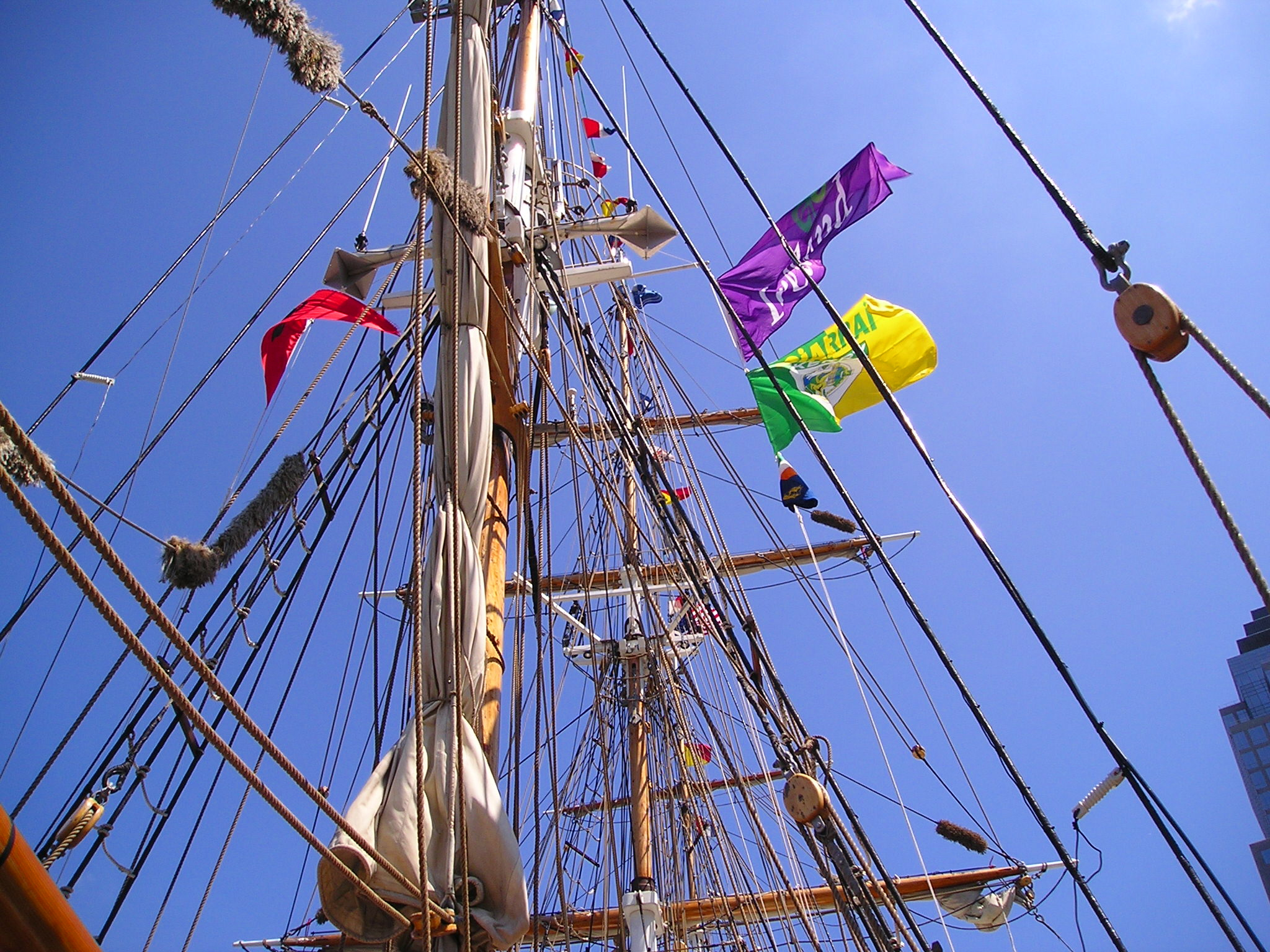
Jeanie Johnston in New York, 2003

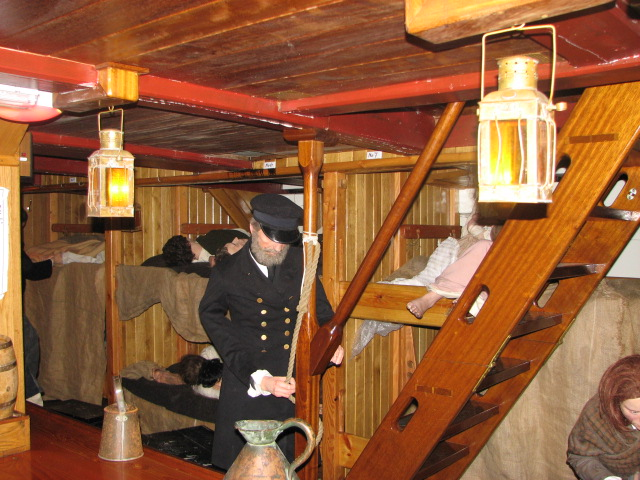
Jeanie Johnston below decks

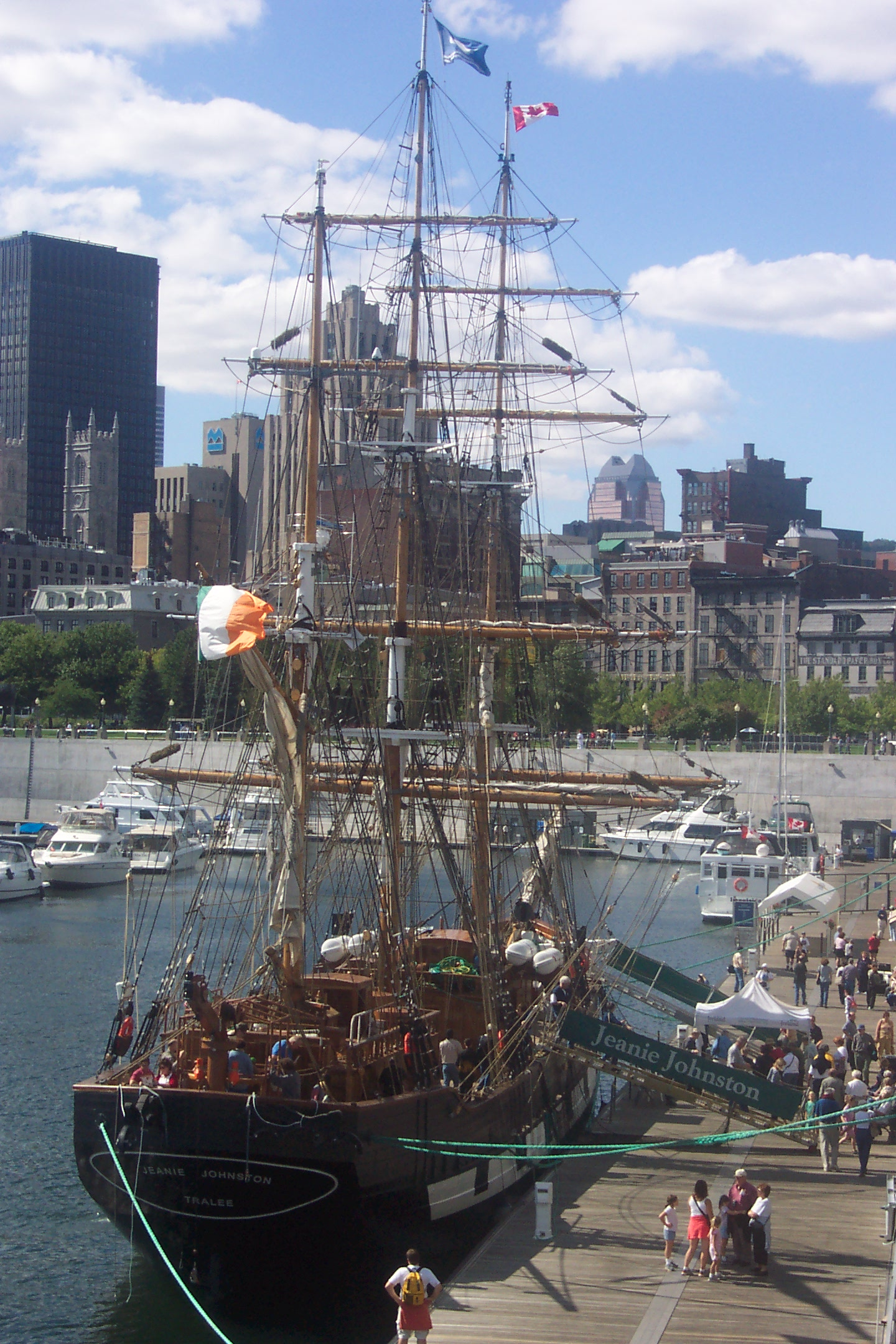
At the Jacques Cartier Pier in Montréal in September 2003
