= Banna Strand =

Beach in County Kerry, Ireland

Coordinates: 52.3582°N 9.8368°W

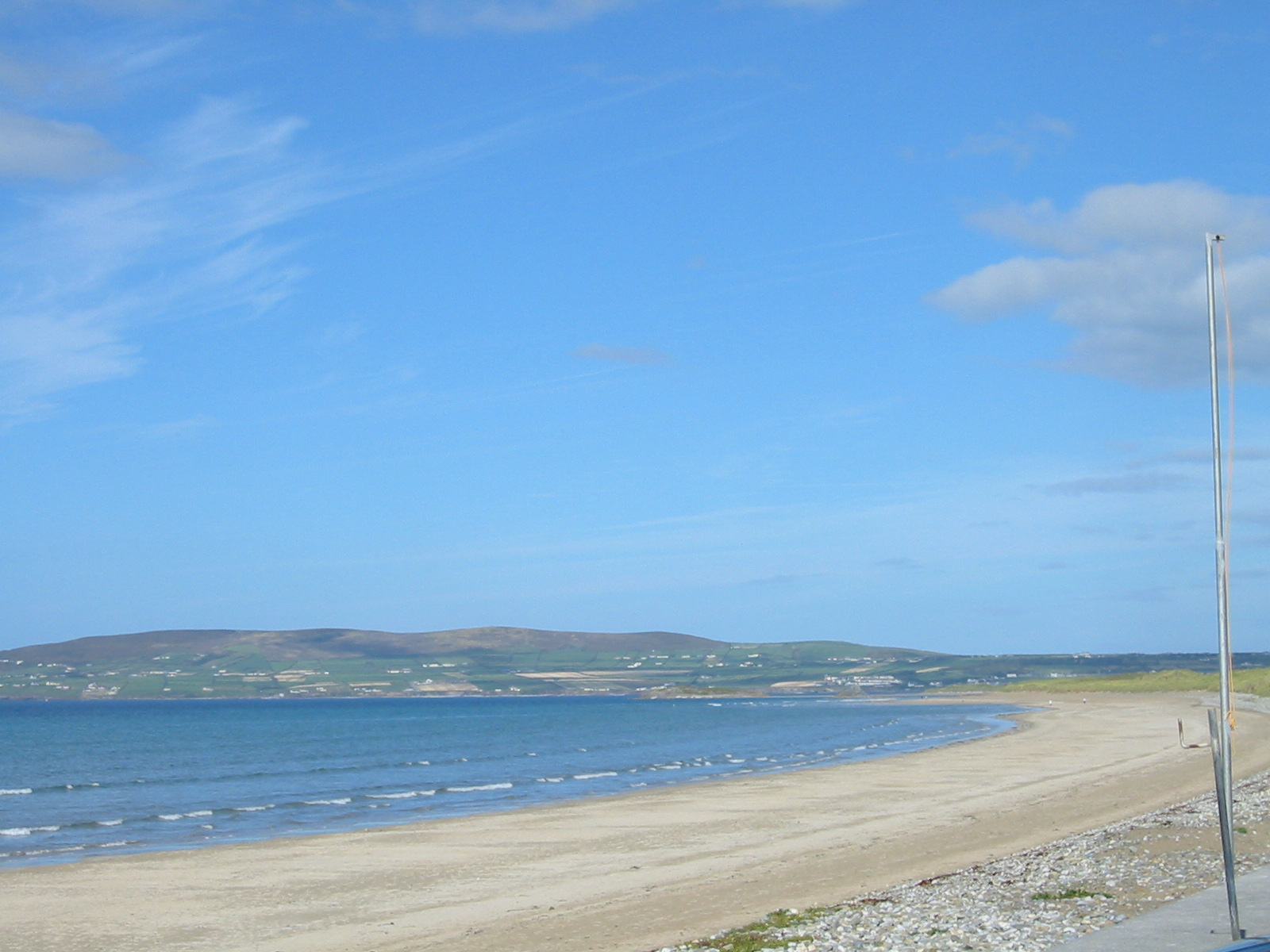
Banna Strand

Banna Strand (Irish: Trá na Beannaí), also known as Banna Beach, is a beach in north County Kerry, Ireland. It is an Atlantic Ocean beach extending from the Smallrock (Roc Beag) and Blackrock in the North to Carrahane at its southern edge. It is around 12 kilometres (7 mi) north west of Tralee. It features shifting sand dunes along its entire length which rise up to 12 metres (40 ft). Carrahane lagoon on the south end, famous for migrating birds and the Roger Casement landing. The mountains of the Dingle Peninsula can be seen on the south west horizon. Many residents from Tralee make a trip to Banna Strand on the warmest summer days.

== History ==
=== Roger Casement ===
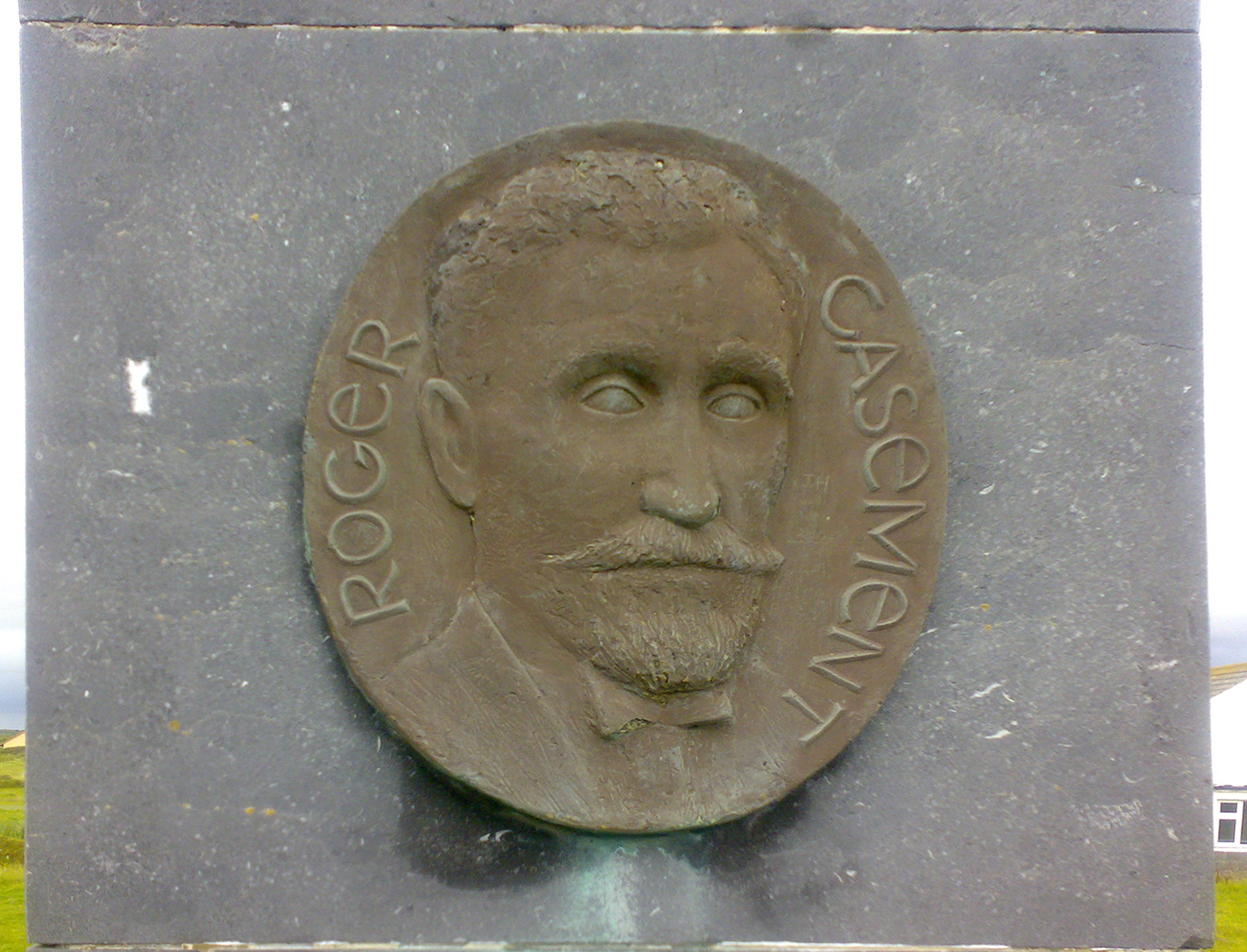
Roger Casement monument

Historically, Banna Strand is associated with Roger Casement who was captured on 21 April 1916, having landed from a German U-boat. Casement was involved in an attempt to land arms for Irish Republicans from the German vessel the Aud. A monument for Casement and another man, Robert Monteith, stands near the dunes with the inscription:

"At a spot on Banna beach adjacent to here Roger Casement - Humanitarian & Irish revolutionary leader - Robert Monteith & a third man came ashore from a German submarine on Good Friday morning 21 April 1916 in furthering the cause of Irish freedom."

The mysterious 'third man' was Daniel Julian Bailey, a soldier in the Royal Irish Rifles in the British Army who when a POW was recruited (as Daniel Beverley) into the 'Casement Brigade'.

The monument was erected in 1966 to commemorate the 50th anniversary of the landing. A decision was taken by the 1966 Banna Strand committee to deliberately omit the name of the "third man" from the monument because, following his capture, he turned "King's evidence". The sod was turned, for the construction of the monument, by Florrie Monteith, the daughter of Robert Monteith. She was also the author of a biography of her father that was entitled "The Mystery Man of Banna Strand".

=== 1980s to the present ===
Horizon Radio, a Kerry radio station from the 1980s, was located in Banna. Banna Beach Hotel was opened nearby by Joe Murphy and in 2002 expanded to Banna Beach Leisure centre. In the 1990s, the car parking area was moved to the beach from behind the dunes.

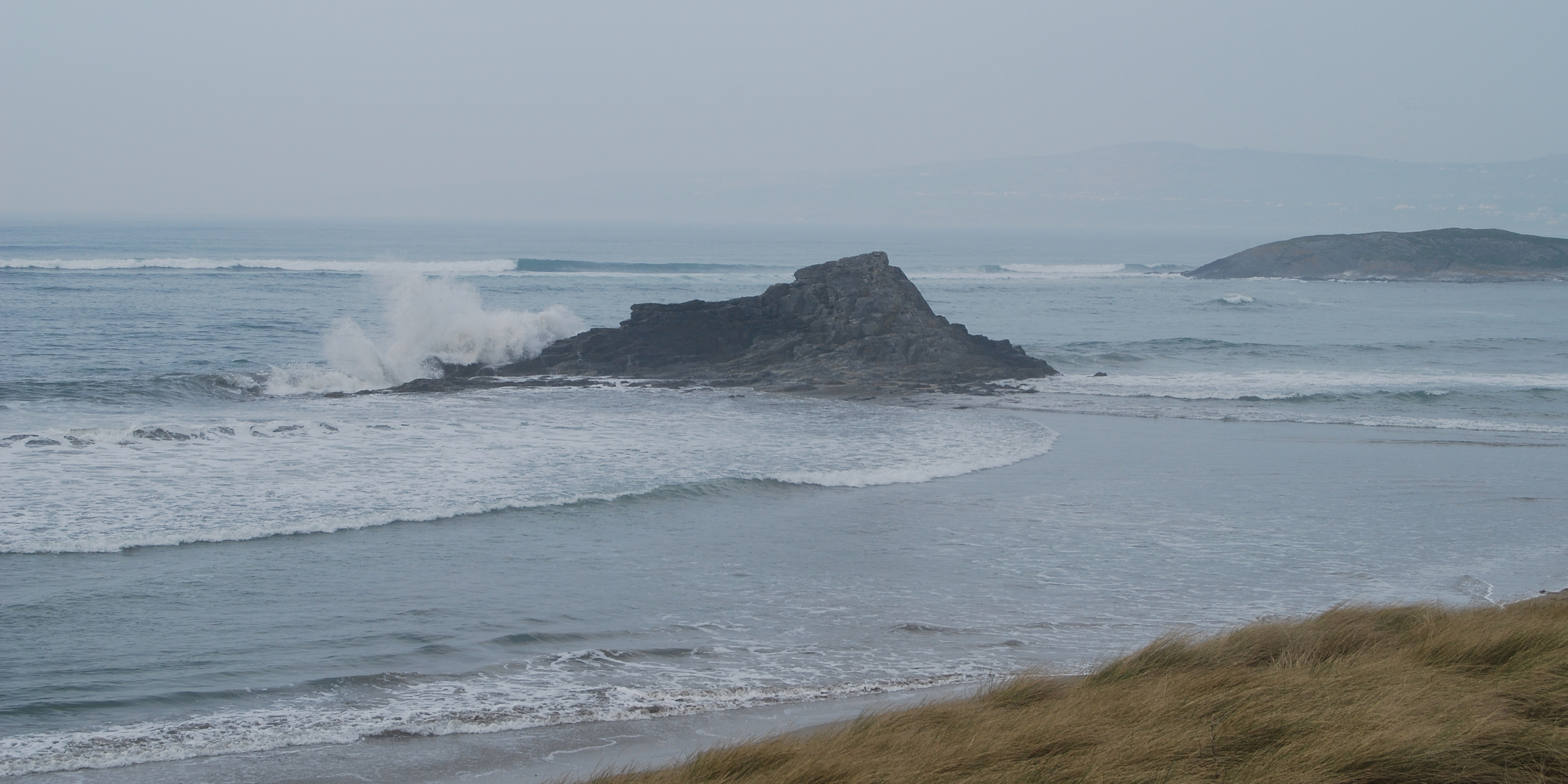
The Black Rock
