= Kennelly =

Kennelly is a surname. Notable people with the surname include:

- Ardyth Kennelly (1912–2005), American novelist
- Arthur E. Kennelly (1861–1939), American engineer
- Barbara B. Kennelly (born 1936), Connecticut Representative
- Brendan Kennelly (1936–2021), Irish poet and novelist
- Ian Kennelly (born 2001), American football player
- Jerry Kennelly, Irish photojournalist, founder of Stockbyte and Tweak.com
- Joan Kennelly (died 2007), Irish photojournalist
- Keala Kennelly (born 1978), American surfer
- Martin H. Kennelly (1887–1961), mayor of Chicago
- Matt Kennelly (Mathew Luke Kennelly; born 1989), Australian baseball player
- Matthew F. Kennelly (born 1956), Federal District Court Judge in Illinois
- Michael Kennelly (1914–2011), American Jesuit Catholic priest, President of the Loyola University New Orleans (1970–1974)
- Noel Kennelly (born 1979), Irish Gaelic football player
- Pádraig Kennelly (1929–2011), Irish journalist, editor and photographer
- Pat Kennelly (1900–1981), Australian politician
- Paul Kennelly (born 1947), Australian rules footballer
- Richard Kennelly (born 1965), American Olympic rower
- Ryan Kennelly (born 1974), American powerlifter
- Sheila Kennelly (born 1927), Australian actress
- Tadhg Kennelly (born 1981), Irish Gaelic football player
- Tim Kennelly (1954–2005), Irish Gaelic football player
- Tim Kennelly (baseball) (born 1986), Australian baseball player

== See also ==
- Kennelly–Heaviside layer, a layer of the Earth's ionosphere
- Kenneally (disambiguation)
