= Tania Tetlow =

American lawyer

Tania C. Tetlow

33rd President of Fordham University
- Incumbent
- Assumed office July 1, 2022
- Preceded by: Joseph McShane

17th President of Loyola University New Orleans
- In office July 1, 2018 – May 31, 2022
- Preceded by: Kevin Wildes
- Succeeded by: Justin Daffron (interim)

Personal details
- Born: Tania Christina Tetlow New York, New York, U.S.
- Spouse: Gordon Stewart (m. 2009)
- Education: Tulane University (BA); Harvard University (JD)

Tania Christina Tetlow is an American lawyer and law professor who has been president of Fordham University since July 1, 2022. Previously, she was president of Loyola University New Orleans. She is the first woman and the first layperson to hold each of those positions at those two Catholic universities.

At the start of her professional career she clerked for a federal judge and worked as an attorney in private practice. She was an assistant U.S. attorney from 2000 to 2005. She taught law at Tulane University from 2000 to 2015, leading its Domestic Violence Clinic from 2005 to 2014. She held senior administrative positions at Tulane from 2015 to 2018.

== Biography ==
=== Early life ===
Tetlow was born in New York to L. Mulry Tetlow, a clinical psychologist and psychology professor as well as a former Jesuit priest, and Elisabeth Meier Tetlow, a biblical scholar and author. Her parents met while graduate students at Fordham University. She was raised in New Orleans and attended Benjamin Franklin High School there and was a recipient of the National Merit Scholarship. Tetlow attended Tulane University on a Dean's Honor Scholarship beginning at age 16. She was a Truman Fellow in 1991 and graduated cum laude in 1992. She graduated magna cum laude from Harvard Law School in 1995.

=== Career ===
While a student at Tulane, Tetlow was an aide to former congresswoman and ambassador Lindy Boggs. After graduating from law school, she served as a law clerk to Judge James Dennis of the United States Fifth Circuit Court of Appeals, and from 1996 to 2000 she was an associate at Phelps Dunbar Law Firm in New Orleans, litigating complex commercial transactions, civil fraud, and representing journalists in first amendment issues. She then served as an assistant United States attorney for the Eastern District of Louisiana, prosecuting violent crimes and major narcotic cases.

In 2005, Tetlow became an Associate Professor and Director of Tulane's Domestic Violence Clinic, where students represented clients escaping violent relationships and protecting their children. She raised $2.3 million in federal grant funds for the clinic. Tetlow organized efforts for criminal justice reform in New Orleans for victims of domestic violence and sexual assault, and has advised several governments around the world. In 2014, she traveled to China as part of a U.S. State Department delegation people-to-people high level exchange. In addition to her involvements with law, she also helped raise $7 million to rebuild libraries following Hurricane Katrina in 2005.

Tetlow started her teaching career in 1998 as a part-time adjunct professor at Loyola University New Orleans College of Law, where she taught a seminar on constitutional law and race. She rose to full professor at Tulane Law School and focused her scholarship on equal protection and discrimination in juror selection. Her research helped create new anti-discrimination policies at the U.S. Department of Justice. In 2015, Tetlow became Associate Provost for International Affairs at Tulane, a newly created position to coordinate the university's international activities, programs and students.

Tetlow was appointed Senior Vice-president and Chief of Staff at Tulane in 2015 and served as the top strategic advisor to the university's president, Michael Fitts. During her time in that role, the university's enrollment, retention and fundraising increased.

=== Loyola presidency ===
On May 2, 2018, Tetlow was elected president of Loyola University New Orleans, following the retirement of Kevin Wildes. She was the first female to become president of the university. She was the first non-priest to hold the position.

Tetlow was inaugurated as the 17th president of Loyola on November 16 at Holy Name of Jesus Catholic Church in New Orleans. The inauguration was a two-day celebration that included a missioning mass, an on-campus student event, and the official ceremony. New Orleans Mayor LaToya Cantrell, President Emeritus of Xavier University of Louisiana Dr. Norman C. Francis, Cokie Roberts, and Tulane President Michael Fitts were among the guests who spoke at the inauguration ceremony.

On June 8, 2020, Tetlow issued an apology over the Loyola University's lack of response to complaints about racism at the university. She claimed ignorance of the complaints, stating, "It did not come across my desk, no." On the same day, she said in an email that the racist comments may have been pragmatic suggestions.

On April 18, 2021, Tetlow addressed rape allegations against Rev. Ted Dziak, former VP for Mission and Identity at Loyola. Domonique Tolliver writes, "Tetlow claims Loyola only recently found out about the allegations after being contacted by a reporter for comment. The university is not aware of any allegations against Dziak during his time at Loyola, according to Tetlow."

=== Fordham presidency ===
On February 10, 2022, Tetlow was named president of Fordham University in New York City effective July 1, 2022. She is the first female and first layperson to be named to that position in its 181-year history. (Note: She is not the first non-Jesuit. The earliest presidents of Fordham were secular priests.)

On October 21, 2022, Tetlow vowed to fight for social justice at her Fordham inauguration.

On January 19, 2023, Tetlow wrote in an email stating, "I am happy to tell you that the University has accepted the union's most recent offer and reached a tentative agreement, subject to approval by their membership," referring to the conclusion of contract negotiations with Fordham Faculty United, a union representing non-tenured faculty. This announcement followed FFU's 90% vote in favor of a strike on January 30th, which was called off January 18th.

In a report titled Taking Responsibility: Jesuit Educational Institutions Confront the Causes and Legacy of Clergy Sexual Abuse, Tetlow's letter discusses the hostility of the legal system determined to disbelieve cases of domestic and sexual abuse. In 2023, a former student filed a second lawsuit regarding sexual assault at Fordham during Tetlow's administration. The student claims that the administration never investigated the assault.

On April 26, 2023, Rina Lokaj, writing for The Fordham Ram, detailed the refusal of Tetlow's administration to ban the use of Non-Disclosure Agreements within Fordham University. At an event organized by the Minorities and Philosophy chapter at Fordham, assistant professor of philosophy at Utah State University and author of “Sworn to Secrecy: The Ethics of Confidentiality Agreements,” addressed Tetlow's position on NDAs. She stated "NDAs protect power." The organization Minorities and Philosophy states that its mission is "to address structural injustices in academic philosophy and to remove barriers that impede participation in academic philosophy for members of marginalized groups."

On May 1, 2024, Fordham students set up tents in the Lowenstein Building on Fordham's Lincoln Center campus, asking the University to divest from companies connected to Israel's 2023 invasion of the Gaza Strip. Tetlow called the New York Police Department, which had recently swept a similar encampment at Columbia University. After NYPD swept the Fordham encampment and arrested fifteen protesters, Tetlow emailed the Fordham community, suggesting "people who are not members of our community" were in the encampment. However, the Fordham Observer reported that each person arrested was either a Fordham student or alumnus.

After the arrests, many Fordham faculty members spoke in support of students and sharply criticized Tetlow's response, with one professor labeling it "hypocritical." Students continued to hold rallies, demanding that the University reinstate the Fordham chapter of Students for Justice in Palestine.

=== Personal life ===
Tetlow married Gordon Stewart, then a business professor at Xavier University in New Orleans, in 2009. Gordon Stewart is the founder and CEO of Porchjam Distillery.
