= Kenneally =

Kenneally is a surname. Notable people with the surname include:

- Billy Kenneally (1925–2009), Irish politician
- Brendan Kenneally (born 1955), Irish politician
- Bryan Kenneally (born 1942), Australian footballer
- Christine Kenneally, Australian-American journalist
- Christy Kenneally (born 1948), Irish author
- Dean Kenneally (born 1967), Australian physiotherapist
- James Kenneally (1879–1954), Australian politician, railwayman and unionist
- James Jerome Kenneally (1870–1949), Australian author
- John Patrick Kenneally (1921–2000), English Victoria Cross recipient
- John Kenneally (hurler), Irish hurler
- John Kenneally (radio presenter), Australian radio presenter
- Siassie Kenneally (1969–2018), Inuk artist
- William Kenneally (1899–1964), Irish politician

Keneally is a variant spelling:

- Gavin Keneally (1933–2020), Australian politician
- Kristina Keneally (born 1968), Australian politician
- Meg Keneally, (born 1966), Australian author
- Mike Keneally (born 1961), American musician
- Thomas Keneally (born 1935), Australian novelist

Kennealy is a variant spelling:

- Patricia Kennealy-Morrison, American novelist, former rock critic
- Robbie Kennealy (born 2006), American stock car racing driver

== See also ==
- Kennelly (disambiguation)
