= Loyola University New Orleans =

Jesuit university in New Orleans, Louisiana, US

- Former names: Loyola College (1904–1912); Loyola University (1912–1996)
- Motto: Deo et Patriae (Latin)
- Motto in English: For God and country
- Type: Private university
- Established: Founded 1904; Chartered July 10, 1912
- Founder: Albert Biever
- Religious affiliation: Roman Catholic (Jesuit)
- Academic affiliations: AJCU, ACCU, NAICU, CIC, space-grant
- Endowment: $244.4 million (2024)
- President: Xavier Cole
- Administrative staff: 240
- Students: 4,351 (fall 2022)
- Undergraduates: 3,205 (fall 2022)
- Postgraduates: 1,146 (fall 2022)
- Location: New Orleans, Louisiana, US; 29°56′06″N 90°07′15″W
- Campus: Total: 23 acres (9.3 ha) Main campus: 19 acres (7.7 ha) Broadway campus: 4 acres (1.6 ha)
- Colors: Maroon, gold & metallic gold
- Nickname: Wolf Pack
- Sporting affiliations: NAIA – SSAC
- Mascot: Havoc T. Wolf
- Website: loyno.edu

Loyola University New Orleans is a private Jesuit university in New Orleans, Louisiana, United States. Originally established as Loyola College in 1904, the institution was chartered as a university in 1912. It bears the name of the Jesuit founder, Saint Ignatius of Loyola, and is a member of the Association of Jesuit Colleges and Universities.

== History ==
=== Founding ===
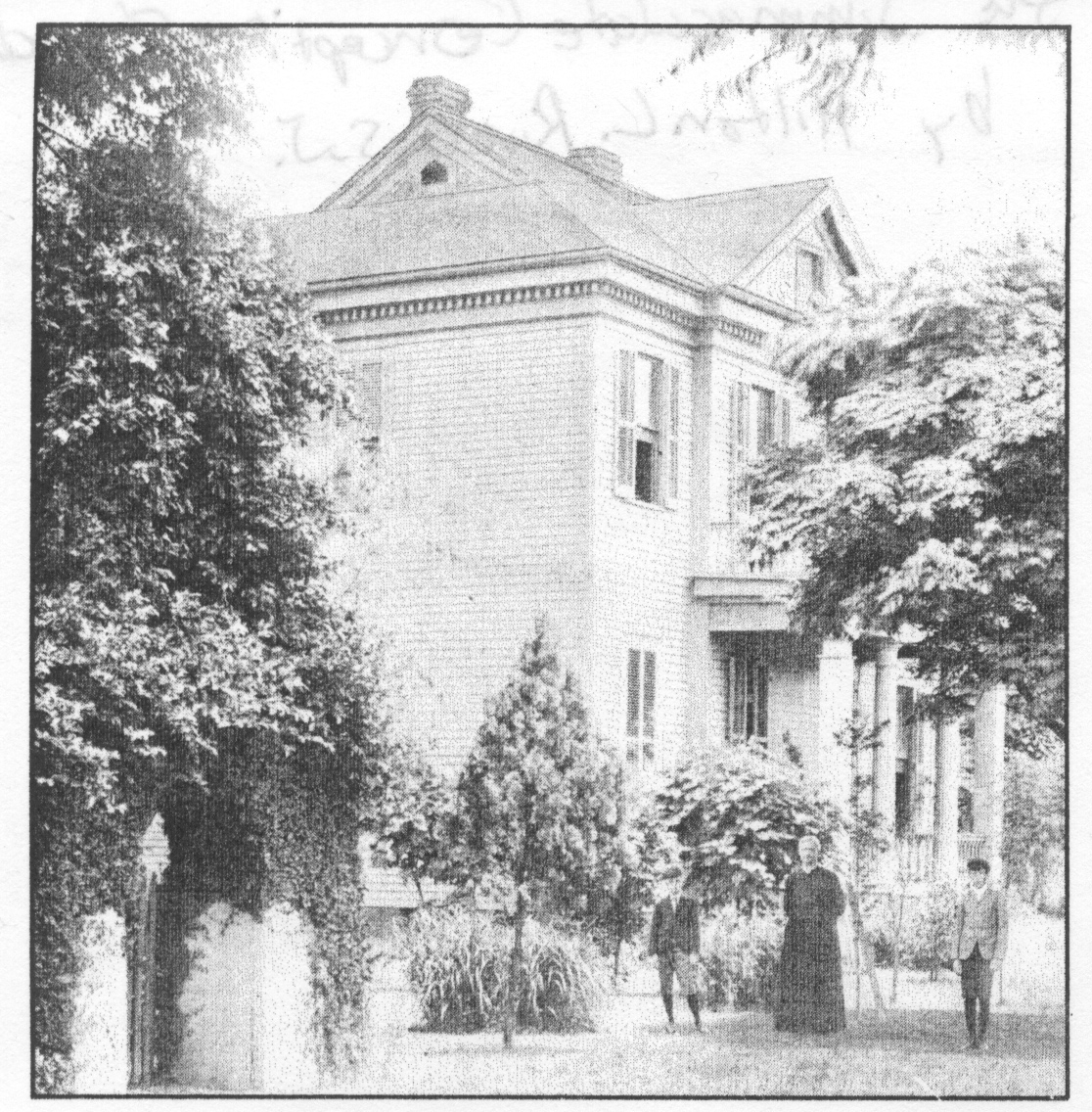
Loyola College c. 1904

In the early 18th century, Jesuits first arrived among the earliest settlers in New Orleans and Louisiana.

Loyola University in New Orleans was founded by the Society of Jesus in 1904 as Loyola College on a section of the Foucher Plantation bought by the Jesuits in 1886. A young Jesuit, Albert Biever, was given a nickel for street car fare and told by his Jesuit superiors to travel Uptown on the St. Charles Streetcar and found a university. As with many Jesuit schools, it contained both a college and preparatory academy. The first classes of Loyola College were held in a residence behind Most Holy Name of Jesus Church. Biever was the first president. The first of Loyola's permanent buildings was undertaken in 1907, with Marquette Hall completed in 1910.

In 1911, the Jesuit schools in New Orleans were reorganized. The College of the Immaculate Conception, founded in 1847 in downtown New Orleans, split its high school and college divisions and became solely a secondary institution, now known as Jesuit High School. Loyola was designated as the collegiate institution and was chartered as Loyola University on July 10, 1912.

=== Growth ===
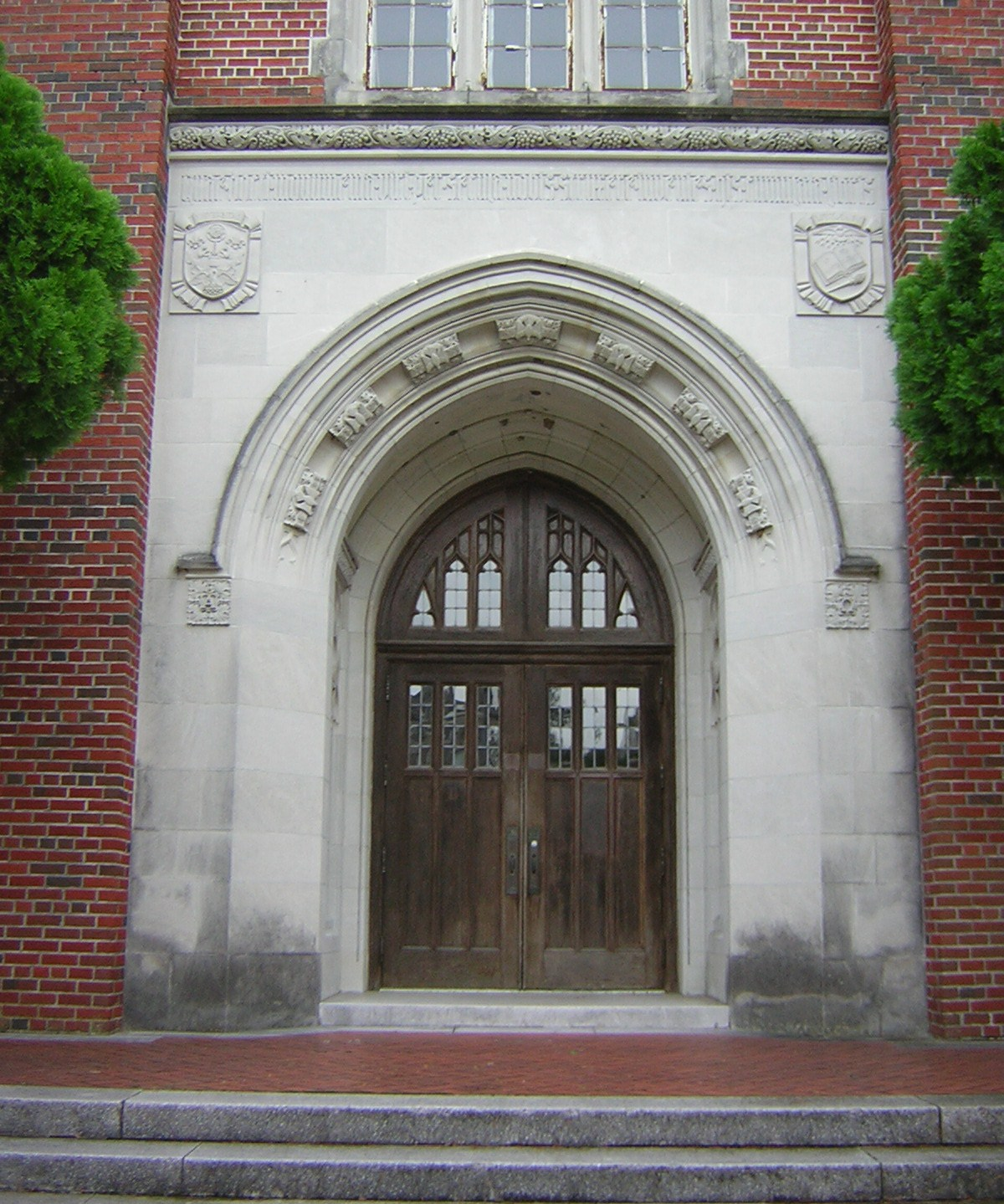
Entrance to the Memorial Library (1950), dedicated to Loyolans killed in World War II

Loyola grew steadily over the years on its uptown campus. By the end of its first decade, the university not only included the College of Arts and Sciences, but also a School of Law (1914), a School of Dentistry (1914), and a College of Pharmacy (1919).

Several years later, a School of Music was added to the growing curriculum. At the time, the university's campus consisted mainly of Marquette and Bobet Halls, with large athletic fields extending back towards the end of the campus at Freret St. Loyola has the distinction of transmitting the first radio broadcast in the Deep South, when WWL began operation as a laboratory experiment on March 31, 1922.

With the discontinuance of the football program in the 1930s, more space became available for construction of new facilities. Stallings Hall, built for the College Of Business Administration, and the Memorial Library (now known as the "Old Library") were constructed in the post World War II years, accommodating the growth of the student population.

Norman Francis entered the Law School in 1952, becoming the first African-American admitted to the university.

More expansion continued in 1964, with the addition of the Joseph A. Danna Student Center; Albert Biever Hall, a student residence hall named after the first university president; and a central heating/cooling plant. Built soon after in 1967 was Henrietta Buddig Hall, a student residence that is Loyola's tallest building at twelve stories. The last building to be added in the 1960s was the J. Edgar Monroe Science Building (now known as Monroe Hall), the largest academic building erected to date.

The College of Pharmacy closed in 1965. The School of Dentistry closed in 1971.

During the 1970s, Loyola began to make many changes, especially regarding Jesuit governance and in the academic curriculum, reflective of many universities during the same period. Reflecting the precedent for reform established by Vatican II, governance of the university shifted from a Jesuit regulated Board of Regents to a combined lay and clerical board of trustees. During this period, the Common Curriculum was developed to give students a wide breadth of knowledge in certain core areas, including Science, Math, History, and English studies. A broader trend was seen in the growth of the university during this period, seeing it gradually transform from a regional, largely commuter college to a higher national profile school that attracted students from across the United States.

In 1984 Loyola purchased the facilities of St. Mary's Dominican College, a nearby Catholic women's college which was closing down, and transformed it into the Broadway campus (after the name of its street location). Today, the Broadway campus includes Loyola's School of Law, Cabra Residence Hall, and a Department of Visual Arts.

Expansion in recent years has seen the addition of Mercy Hall, purchased in 1993, a former girl's preparatory academy; construction of Carrollton Hall, an upperclassman residence; and the J. Edgar and Louise S. Monroe Library, the latter two completed in 1999.

In 1996, the Association of Jesuit Colleges and Universities granted exclusive branding rights to Loyola University Chicago to call itself "Loyola University". This resulted in Loyola New Orleans' current trademark, Loyola University New Orleans.

=== Hurricane Katrina and aftermath ===
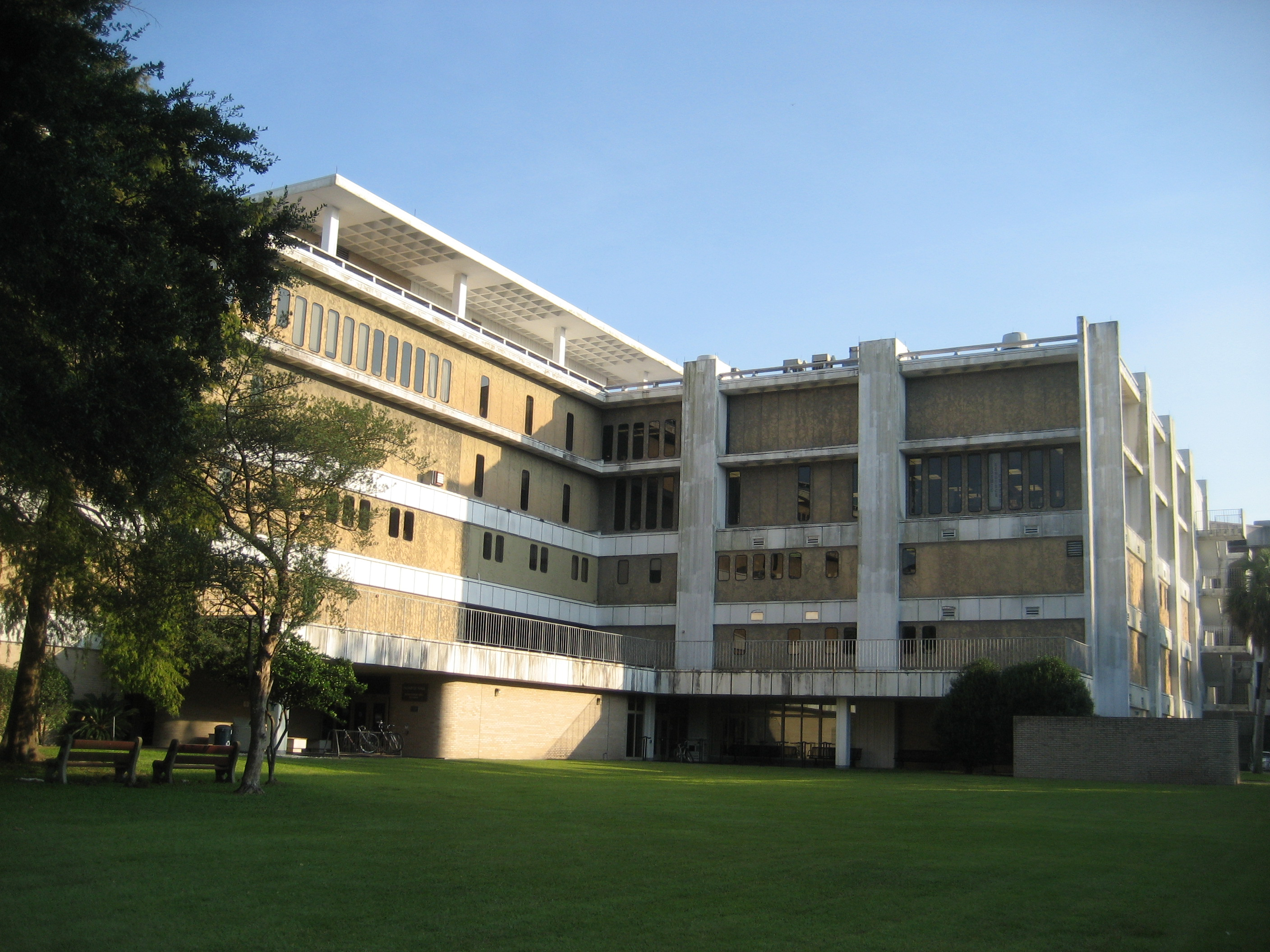
Monroe Hall, pre-renovation

In August 2005, Loyola closed its campus and evacuated its students in anticipation of Hurricane Katrina. The campus sustained minimal wind damage including broken windows but floodwaters did not breach any buildings. Due to the devastation of the city of New Orleans, Loyola canceled classes for the fall 2005 semester. Following cleanup, classes resumed with the start of the spring 2006 semester on Monday, January 9, 2006. Despite the displacement of the entire student body during the fall 2005 semester, 91 percent of Loyola's undergraduate students returned for the spring 2006 semester. Loyola held commencement ceremonies for the Class of 2006 on April 28–29, becoming the first New Orleans college to do so post-Katrina.

On April 10, 2006, president Kevin Wm. Wildes unveiled Pathways - Toward Our Second Century, Loyola's strategic post-Katrina plan. The plan restructured the university's colleges and eliminated several academic programs and faculty positions to reduce operating costs and revitalize the university. The board of trustees unanimously approved and passed the plan on May 19, 2006. In response, the faculty of the College of Arts and Sciences produced a vote of no-confidence in both President Wildes and Provost Walter Harris. In fall 2006, Loyola welcomed the class of 2010, the first post-Katrina freshman class, with 555 new students. Since the storm, Loyola has completed all physical repairs that were caused by the hurricane; and its enrollment is on a steady rise to pre-Katrina numbers.

The student-run online news service, Pack News, was established in 2012. Pack News marks the return of video-based journalism since the broadcast program was eliminated in 2007 with the university-wide Pathways elimination program after Hurricane Katrina.

Local chapters of the Alpha Delta Gamma fraternity, which opened in 1932, and the Sigma Phi Epsilon fraternity, which opened in 1983, were closed during 2012. In 2018, President Wildes announced his intention to resign as president of the university. He was succeeded by Tania Tetlow on May 2, 2018.

In 2018, after years of financial problems, the school was placed on probation by its accreditor, Southern Association of Colleges and Schools Commission on Colleges.

There have been seventeen presidents since the establishment of Loyola College in 1904, including Michael F. Kennelly (1970–1974), William J. Byron (2003-2004 (acting)), and Kevin Wm. Wildes (2004–2018). Tania Tetlow, who became president in 2018, was the university's first lay president; all of her predecessors were Jesuit priests.

University presidents

1. Albert H. Biever (1904–1913)
2. Alphonse E. Otis (1913–1919)
3. Edward A. Cummings (1919–1924)
4. Francis X. Twellmeyer (1924–1925)
5. Florence D. Sullivan (1925–1931)
6. John W. Hynes (1931–1936)
7. Harold A. Gaudin (1936–1939)
8. Percy A. Roy (1939–1945)
9. Thomas J. Shields (1945–1952)
10. W. Patrick Donnelly (1952–1961)
11. Andrew C. Smith (1961–1966)
12. Homer R. Jolley (1966–1970)
13. Michael F. Kennelly (1970–1974)
14. James C. Carter (1974–1995)
15. Bernard P. Knoth (1995–2003)
16. William J. Byron (2003–2004 (acting))
17. Kevin Wm. Wildes (2004–2018)
18. Tania Tetlow (2018–2022)
19. Xavier Cole (2023–present)

=== University seal ===
The seal, which was adopted by the university in 1929, features the coat of arms of the house of Loyola with the emblem of the Society of Jesus at the top. Central to the seal are two wolves and a golden pot, which come from St. Ignatius Loyola's family crest and symbolize generosity (having enough to give to the wolves.) Above the figures of the wolves appears the fleur-de-lis, which represents the French origin of New Orleans and Louisiana. Beneath it is a pelican feeding its young with her own blood; this ancient symbol of Christianity (Christ feeding the Church with his body and blood through the Eucharist) depicts Loyola as an institution of the state of Louisiana.

== Academics ==
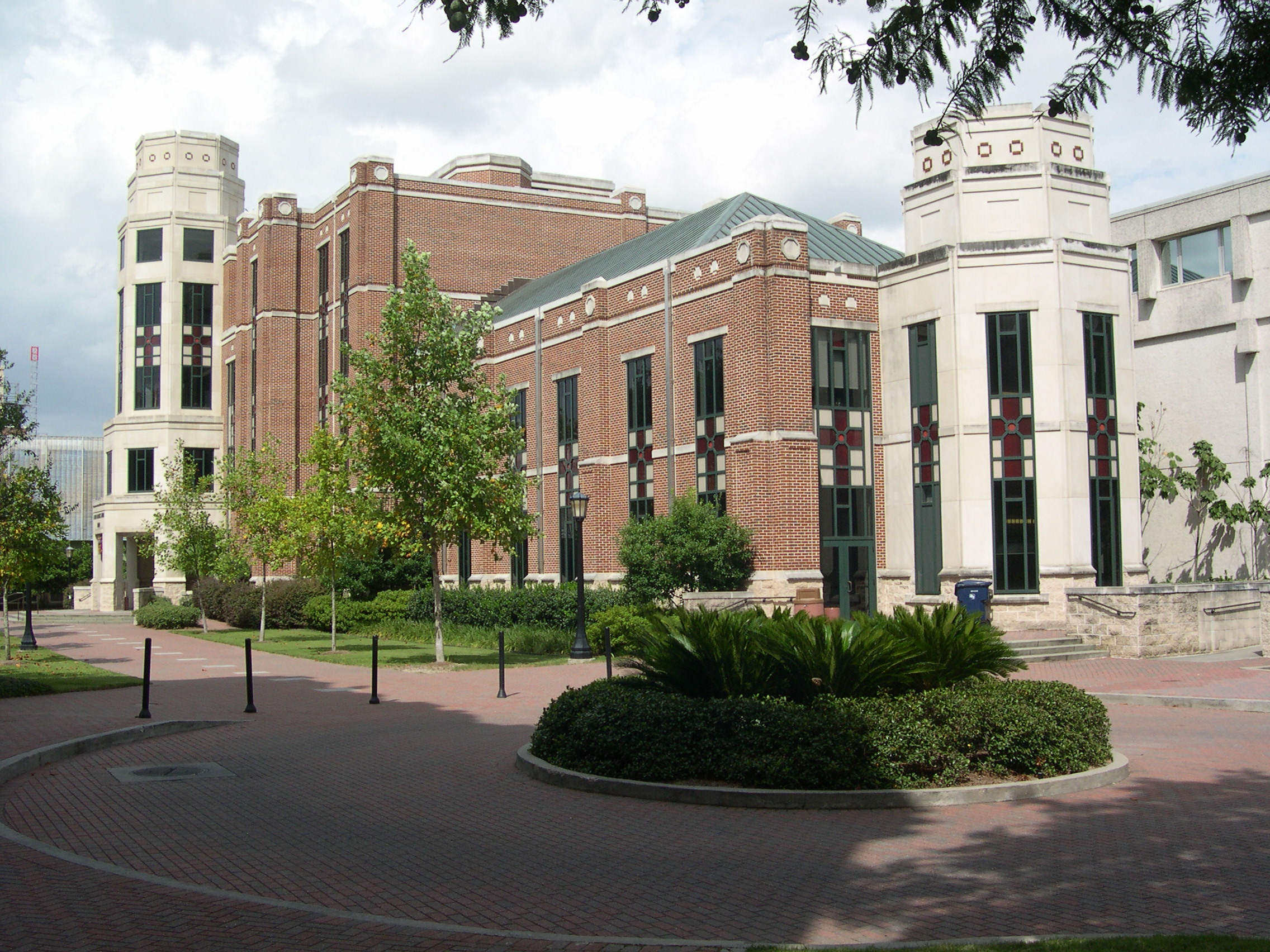
The southwest side of J. Edgar and Louise S. Monroe Library

Academic rankings

Master's
- Washington Monthly: 70

Regional
- U.S. News & World Report: 10 (South)

National
- Forbes: 443

The university enrolls 5,000 students, including 3,000 undergraduates. The student to faculty ratio is 11 to 1. The Princeton Review featured Loyola New Orleans in the 2010 edition of its annual book, The Best 371 Colleges. Loyola University New Orleans ranked 10th of the South regional universities in the 2017 U.S. News & World Report Best College Ranking. The New York-based education services company says Loyola New Orleans offers students an outstanding undergraduate education.

Loyola professors have been recognized nationally and internationally by the Pulitzer Committee, the National Science Foundation, the National Endowment for the Humanities, and by numerous other associations.

=== Colleges ===
Loyola is organized into colleges specializing in the liberal arts, social and physical sciences and certain professions. The colleges at Loyola include:

- College of Arts and Sciences
- The Joseph A. Butt, S.J., College of Business
- College of Music and Fine Arts
- College of Law
- College of Nursing and Health

==== College of Arts and Sciences ====
The College of Arts and Sciences focuses on areas concerning the natural sciences, social sciences, and liberal arts programs. Students have been awarded British Marshall, Fulbright, Goldwater, Mellon, Mitchell, and Rhodes scholarships and have been included as USA Today's top students.

==== Joseph A. Butt, S.J., College of Business ====
The College of Business began as an outgrowth of the College of Arts and Sciences and became a full-fledged college in 1947. In 1983, the College of Business was renamed in honor of Joseph A. Butt, a longtime Jesuit professor in the business college. The College of Business is accredited by the Association to Advance Collegiate Schools of Business (AACSB).

==== College of Music and Fine Arts ====
The College of Music was established when the New Orleans Conservatory of Music and Dramatic Art, which was founded by Ernest Schuyten in 1919, was incorporated into the university in 1932. It is the only Jesuit college of music in the United States. In April 2007, the Thelonious Monk Institute of Jazz Performance announced its relocation to the College of Music and Fine Arts from the campus of the University of Southern California. The music industry program was one of the first in the country and it combines both the performing and technical aspects of the music business.

==== College of Law ====
Loyola's law school opened in 1914. Co-located for many years on the main campus of Loyola, the Law School moved to the new Broadway campus in 1986, after Loyola purchased the closed campus of St. Mary's Dominican College in 1984.

==== College of Nursing and Health ====
The College of Nursing and Health is accredited by the Commission on Collegiate Nursing Education (CCNE). It also includes the Loyola Institute for Ministry.

=== Centers and institutes ===
The university houses institutes in many different disciplines:

- Twomey Center for Peace Through Justice
- Jesuit Social Research Institute (JSRI)
- Center for Environmental Communications
- Center for the Study of Catholics in the South
- Gillis Long Poverty Law Center
- Jesuit Center
- Lindy Boggs National Center for Community Literacy
- Loyola Institute of Politics
- Loyola Institute for Ministry (LIM)
- Shawn M. Donnelley Center for Nonprofit Communications

==== Jesuit Social Research Institute ====
'The esuit Social Research Institute (JSRI) is a joint effort of Loyola University New Orleans and the Society of Jesus Central and Southern Province, originating in 2007. Its main efforts are in the areas of research, policy analysis, and advocacy for justice, especially with regard to poverty, immigration, and racism issues.

The Institute publishes JustSouth Quarterly and JustSouth E-newsletter, and employs the various means of publication on and off the web along with presentations at conferences and before legislative bodies. It also makes presentations in schools and parishes. It is active in advocacy on issues pertaining to its core expertise.

In May 2016 JSRI published the "JustSouth Index", which provides a comparison of how each of the states Texas, Louisiana, Mississippi, Alabama, and Florida are doing on critical indices of economic and social welfare as compared to the 50 states.

== Campus ==
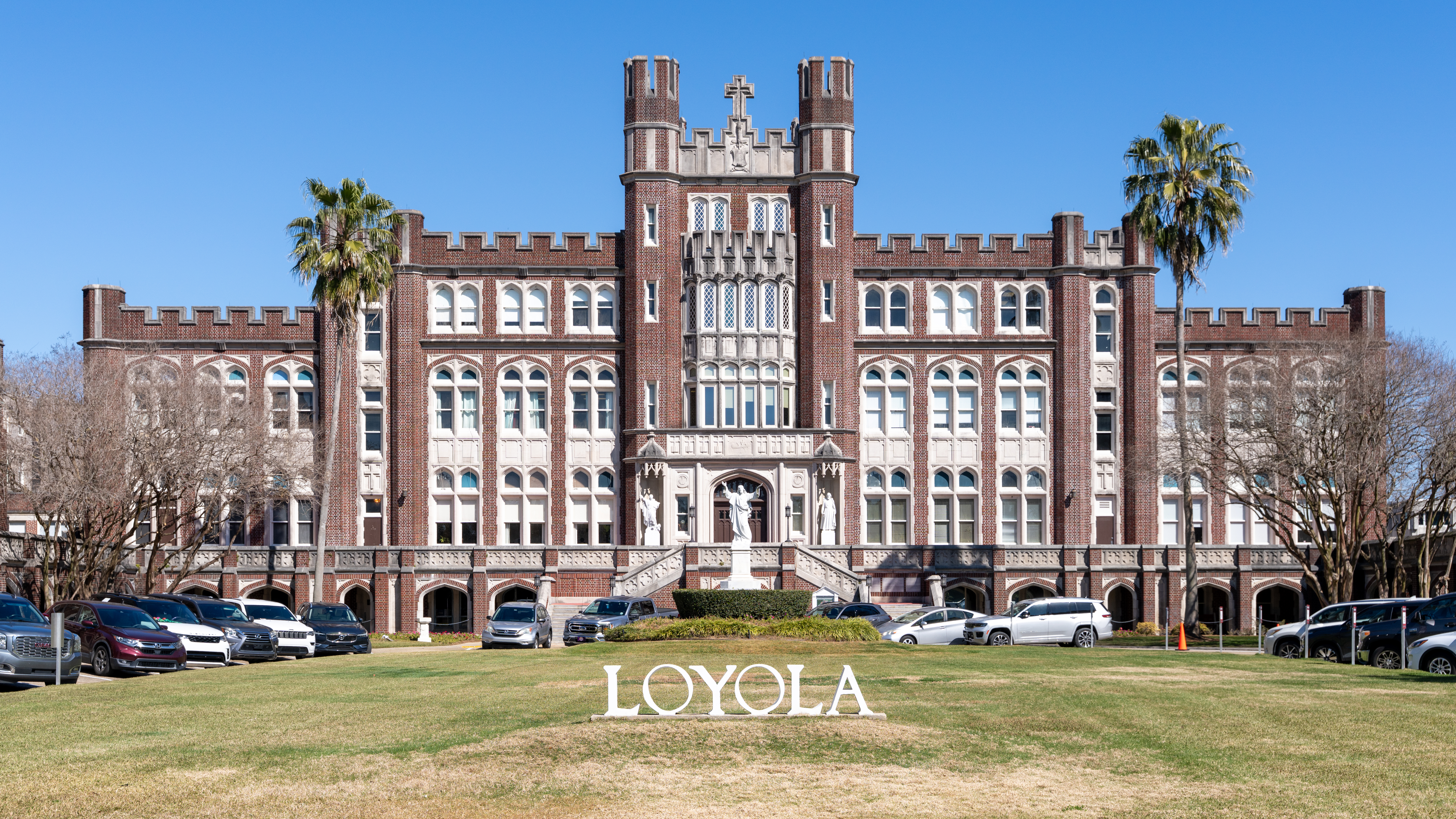
Marquette Hall

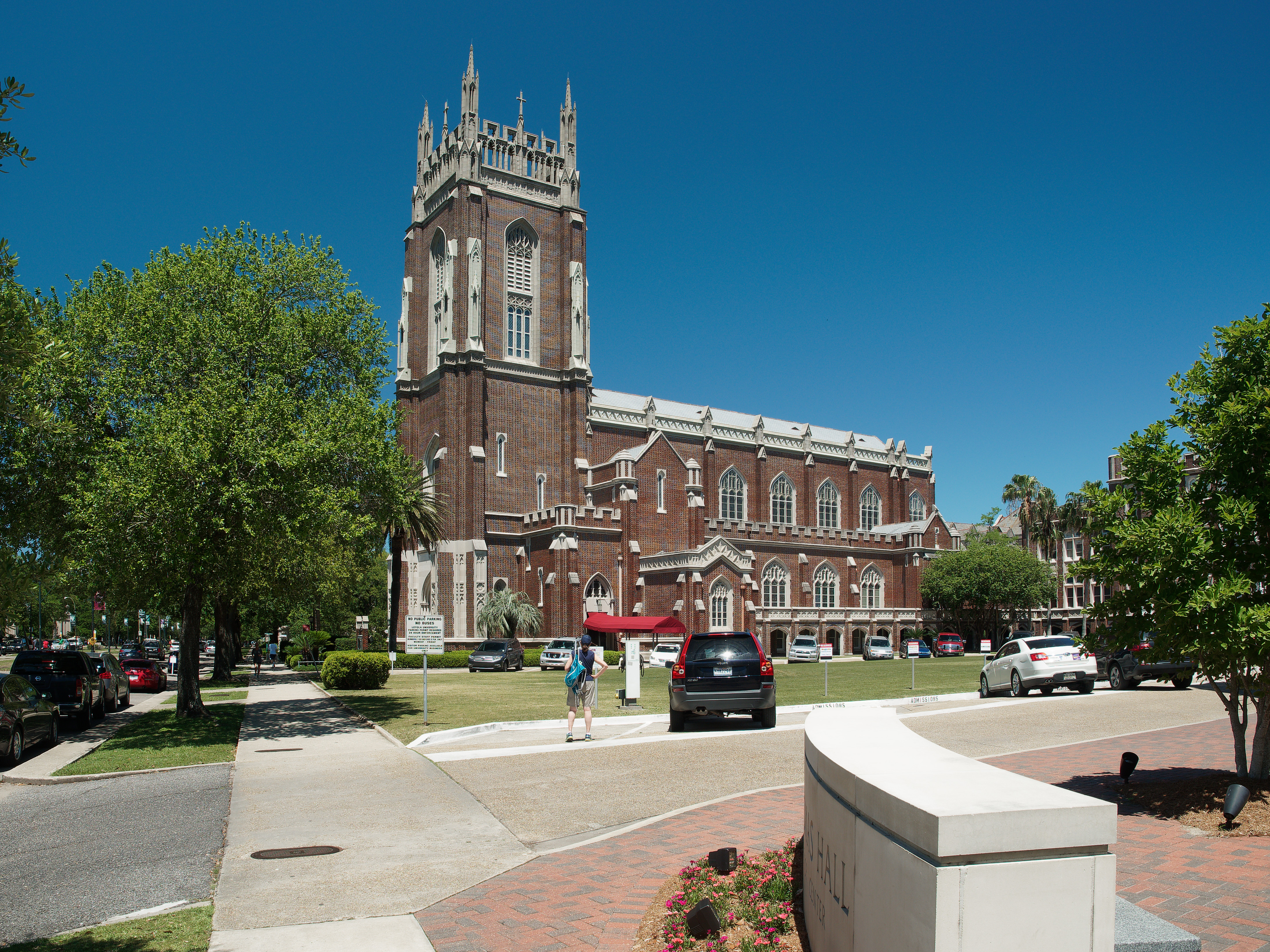
Campus and church

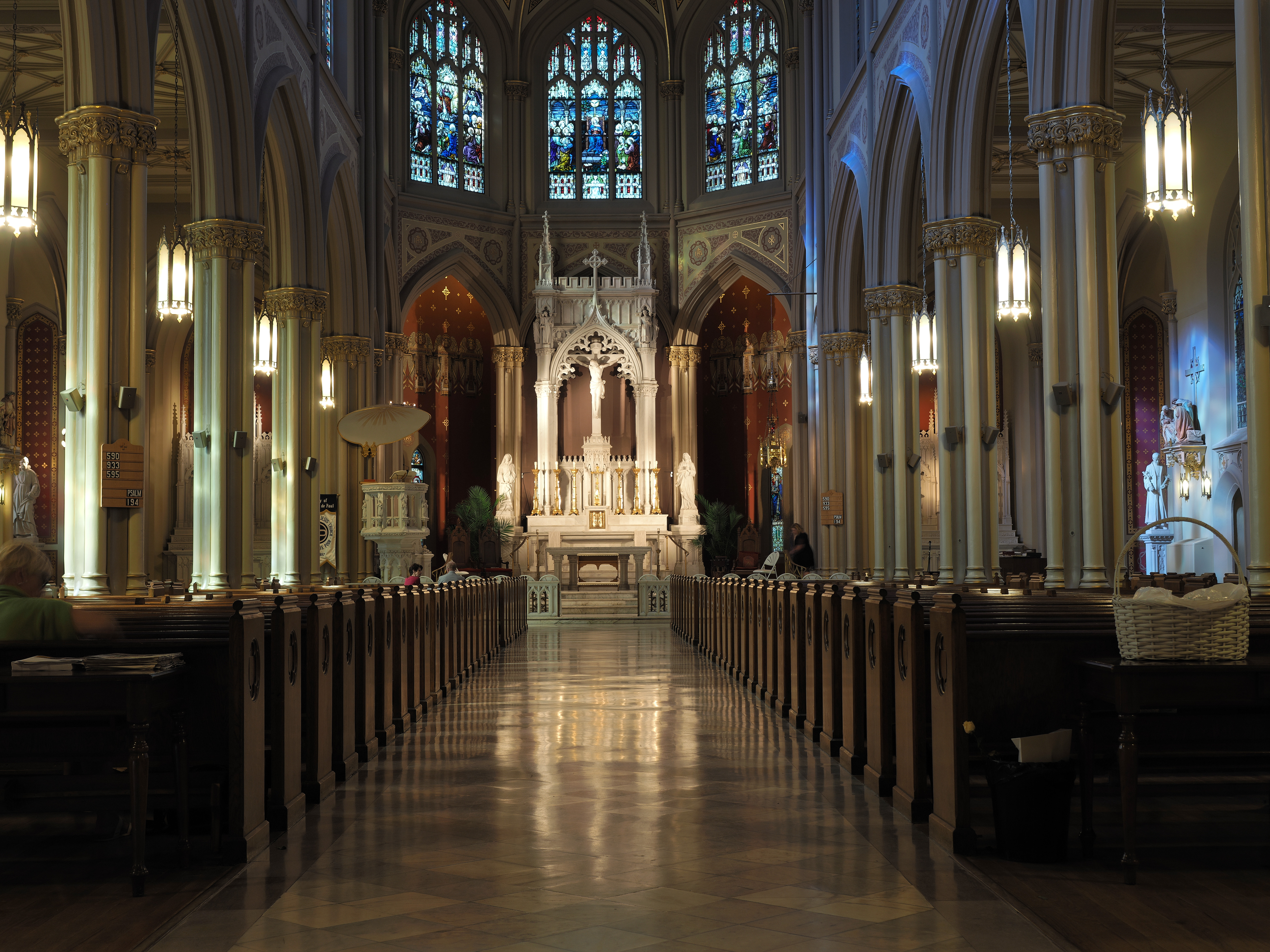
Holy Name of Jesus Church interior

Loyola is located in the historic Audubon Park District on St. Charles Avenue. Its original campus, now called the Main Campus, was founded on a tract of land purchased by the New Orleans Jesuits in 1889. The purchased portion of land was much larger than the current day campus; in fact, the original land purchase contained the land now occupied by both Loyola and Tulane universities and Audubon Place. Through the next twenty years, portions of the original land purchase were sold to different entities to raise money for the new university, resulting in the current Main Campus area of 19 acres.

By the 1950s, most of the original campus had been developed and the university looked around for areas where it could expand. In the 1960s, J. Edgar Monroe, a major benefactor of the university, donated to Loyola a large undeveloped tract of land in Metairie where the university could either expand or move its entire location. After reviewing its options, including the sale of the original campus to Tulane University, the university decided to remain on St. Charles Avenue, subsequently selling off its property in Metairie in ten years as a condition of the donation.

The Louis J. Roussel Jr., Performance Hall on the Loyola campus, which stages symphony concerts, is named for the late New Orleans businessman Louis J. Roussel Jr.

The closure of St. Mary's Dominican College in 1984 provided an opportunity for Loyola to expand its campus. After renovation of the closed college and some new construction, the Broadway Campus was opened in 1986, with several university offices and programs, the school of law most significantly, moving to the new campus.

=== Main campus ===
Loyola's first campus, the Main Campus is located on St. Charles Avenue across from Audubon Park and adjacent to Tulane University, which also fronts St. Charles. The St. Charles Streetcar passes in front of the main campus. According to The Princeton Review, Loyola students get along well with members of the local community. It is ranked #11 out of 371 Best Colleges for Great Town-Gown Relations.

The Main Campus contains the majority of the undergraduate academic divisions on campus, as well as serves as the hub of campus activities. Fronting St. Charles is Marquette Hall, the oldest campus building, which serves as the iconic image of the university. Several quadrangles organize the campus proceeding from the front of campus to its northern border at Freret Street, including the Academic quad, the Plaza De Los Martires De La Paz, or Peace Quad, named after the Salvadoran martyrs of 1989, and the Residential Quad. Other notable buildings include the Joseph Danna Student Center, J. Edgar and Louise S. Monroe Library, Bobet Hall, J. Edgar Monroe Hall, the Music and Communications Building, and Branch Knox Miller Hall.

==== Marquette Hall ====
Named after the Jesuit explorer Jacques Marquette, Marquette Hall is one of the most prominent buildings on campus. Begun in 1907, it was finished in 1910. After its completion, most of the classes of the college and later, the university were conducted in the building until the construction of Bobet Hall in the late 1920s. The university's first library, the Bobet Library, was located on the third floor of Marquette Hall until the Memorial Library was constructed in the 1950s. When the dentistry school began its operations, the fourth floor of Marquette was used partly as a cadaver dissection area, and an external winch was used to hoist the cadavers up the four floors. Today, Marquette primarily functions as an administrative building, but some classes are still conducted there. Also, the main theatre used by the Theatre Arts program is housed on the third floor of the building.

==== J. Edgar and Louise S. Monroe Library ====
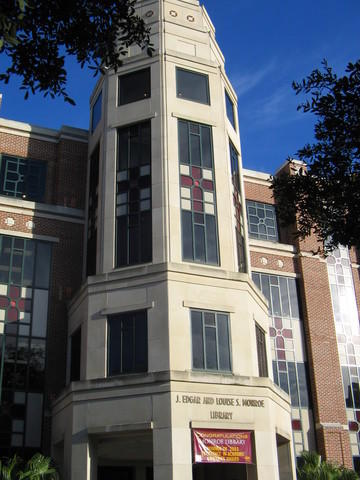
Monroe Library

The J. Edgar and Louise S. Monroe library is the main university library, constructed in 1999, replacing the Memorial Library built in 1950. The 150,000-square-foot (14,000 m^{2}) library includes 377,000 books and periodicals and online access to 36,000 journals and 27,000 e-books. Its music collection includes over 20,000 scores and recordings, and the special collections and archives include material concerning the history of Louisiana and the South, the Society of Jesus, and Loyola University New Orleans. The library has won numerous awards in its existence, including the Association of College & Research Libraries' 2003 "Excellence in Academic Libraries Award and the 2004 H.W. Wilson Award for Professional Development. More so, the library ranks 5th in the "Best College Library" category of The Princeton Review's 2010 edition of The Best 361 Colleges.

==== Weekend uses of campus ====
In previous years the Japanese Weekend School of New Orleans (ニューオリンズ日本語補習校 Nyū Orinzu Nihongo Hoshūkō), a Weekend Japanese school program, held its classes at Loyola University's main campus. Kindergarten and elementary school students used Monroe Hall and Junior high school students used Marquette Hall.

=== Broadway campus ===
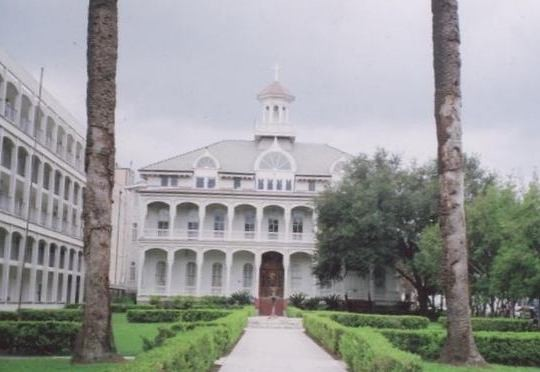
Greenville Hall, built 1889, faces St. Charles Ave on the Broadway Campus.

The former campus of St. Mary's Dominican College, the 4-acre (16,000 m^{2}) site was purchased by Loyola in 1984. Broadway Street forms its downtown border, and fronts St. Charles Avenue. The campus is located in the Greenville neighborhood, a former plantation and town annexed by New Orleans in the 19th Century. Greenville Hall, a Registered Historic Place built in 1889, forms the focus of the small campus, along with the College of Law building.

==== Law Library ====
Loyola University New Orleans' Law Library is located in the College of Law building on the Broadway Campus. It contains over 286,000 volumes and microfilm for the support of the students and faculty of the College of Law. Due to the unique tradition of civil law in Louisiana, the library has substantial collections from civil law jurisdictions from around the world, including France, Scotland, and Quebec.

=== Sustainability ===
Loyola's Statement on Environmental Responsibility details the ways in which campus operations strives to maintain its facilities in an environmentally sound and sustainable manner. Currently, 75% of all university classrooms are equipped with motion sensor lights and irrigation systems are designed with rain sensors to conserve water, both efforts supporting energy efficiency. The Loyola recycling program includes office paper, aluminum cans, and newspaper.

The student-run group Loyola University Community Action Program organizes the Environmental Action Program, which works to educate and advocate for environmental justice on campus and in the Gulf Coast region. The Student Government Association maintains a Sustainability Garden to provide the campus community with gardening space and supplies as well as sustainability information.

== Student life ==
=== Danna Student Center ===
The epicenter of Loyola's on-campus life is the Dr. Joseph A. Danna Center, built in 1964. The Danna Student Center houses many services, including the campus bookstore, lounges, and student organization and university offices, and all of the university's dining services. Loyola's main cafeteria, the Orleans Room (colloquially known as the "O.R.") is also housed in the building. In 2008, the university completed a US$3 million renovation of the Danna Student Center under the guidance of Henry R. Muñoz III, improving the organization and services of the building.

=== Student housing ===
The university requires all students from outside the metropolitan New Orleans area to live on campus their first two years. Housing options include four on-campus residence halls for students: Biever Hall, Buddig Hall, Carrollton Hall, and Cabra Hall. Biever and Buddig hall are primarily reserved for freshmen and underclassmen male and female students, respectively. Carrollton and Cabra Halls are for upperclassmen students, offering suite and apartment-style living. The Department of Residential Life manages the Residence Halls, and provides programming aimed at building community within the residence halls. The Residence Hall Association, made up of residential students, serves as a representative for students to the administration and also allocates funding to student-run projects and activities.

=== University Honors Suite ===
The Honors Suite is located on the first floor of the J. Edgar and Louise S. Monroe Library and includes the "Castle," where its conference table is available for meetings, Quiz Bowl practice and homework; and the "Tower" lounge, designed for study, discussion and the occasional nap. Both areas afford free access to the Honors printer, and are available to Honors students during all library hours. The University Honors program has doubled in size under the directorship of Naomi Yavneh Klos, who is currently the president of the National Collegiate Honors Council and chair of the Association of Jesuit Colleges and Universities Honors Consortium.

=== University Sports Complex ===
The University Sports Complex, formerly called the Recreational Sports Complex or Rec Plex, houses all the athletic facilities on Loyola's campus. It was constructed in 1987 and paid for in full by Freeport-McMoRan. The complex is situated on the fifth and sixth floors of the Freret Street parking garage.

The complex features a jogging track; indoor tennis, racquetball, and basketball courts; weight rooms; and a swimming pool.

=== Organizations ===
The student body of Loyola is governed by a student government association (SGA).

The Loyola University Community Action Program (LUCAP) was founded in 1975 by a student group led by Loyola students Robert Guasco and Mary Baudouin as an organization connecting students with community service, social justice, and advocacy work in New Orleans and abroad. LUCAP is the largest student organization on campus, due largely to its inclusive membership of any current or former project volunteer. LUCAP partners with local non-profit organizations including Habitat for Humanity, Green Light New Orleans, and the Gulf Restoration Network to provide students with opportunities to serve in their community. LUCAP successfully organized against Freeport-McMoRan in 1995 after the company donated money to Loyola University New Orleans to found the Institute for Environmental Communications, build sports facilities, and support the Twomey Center for Peace Through Justice. The organization cited Freeport's history of lack of regard for environmental quality and its history of human rights violations in the developing world. LUCAP organized a student protest which led to Freeport requesting their donation be returned. Other organizations include Circle K International, Big Brothers/Big Sisters, Peers Advocating Wellness (PAWS), and many others. Many students took a lead in rebuilding New Orleans after Hurricane Katrina through these service organizations.

Loyola is home to 15 social fraternities and sororities that encompass over 20 percent of the undergraduate population. Presently, none of the Greek organizations own official houses. Loyola's Greek organizations are governed by three councils, the Interfraternity Council, the Panhellenic Association, and the National Pan-Hellenic Council.

=== Campus publications and media ===
The student-run weekly newspaper, The Maroon, was established in 1923. It is published weekly during the spring and fall semesters. The Maroon has been nominated for the Associated Collegiate Press' National Pacemaker Award 15 times and won the award in 1983, 1986, 1998, 1999, 2006, 2015, 2021, 2022, and 2024. In 2017 Maroon staff won seven awards in the Catholic Press Association national competition, including three firsts. The Maroon is part of Loyola Student Media, the university student-media organization that publishes and sells advertising for The Maroon, The Maroon Online, Wolf Magazine, and Pack News.

Additional student publications include Wolf Magazine, Loyola's student-run magazine, which is part of Loyola Student Media. Wolf Magazine was once "The Wolf", the annual yearbook. Other student publications include ReVisions, the annual literary arts journal, Hyster, the Women's Issues Organization's zine, and Reader's Response, which publishes the single best paper from each of the English Department's literature and theory courses. Each semester, a small group of students intern for the New Orleans Review, an international journal of contemporary poetry, fiction, nonfiction, art, photography, film and book reviews, founded in 1968.

Crescent City Radio is the university's internet radio station based in New Orleans as a freeform radio station. The station broadcasts a diverse offering of locally produced entertainment, music, and talk programs ranging from listener-requested music, local music talent, and radio formats such as urban contemporary, mainstream urban, adult contemporary, classical music, swamp pop, gospel, and Latin Top 40 Pop. The station is managed by the Music Industry Studies Program of the College of Music and Fine Arts at Loyola University New Orleans.

The student-run online news service, Pack News, posts weekly online video news and entertainment updates along with individual news reports, and commentary. Since 2013, Pack News has focused its weekly news updates to covering one specific topic in depth followed by political commentary. Topics have usually favored the political left and Democratic Party. Pack News is produced by the university's Radio Television Digital News Association's student chapter and is part of Loyola Student Media except in staff hiring.

== Athletics ==
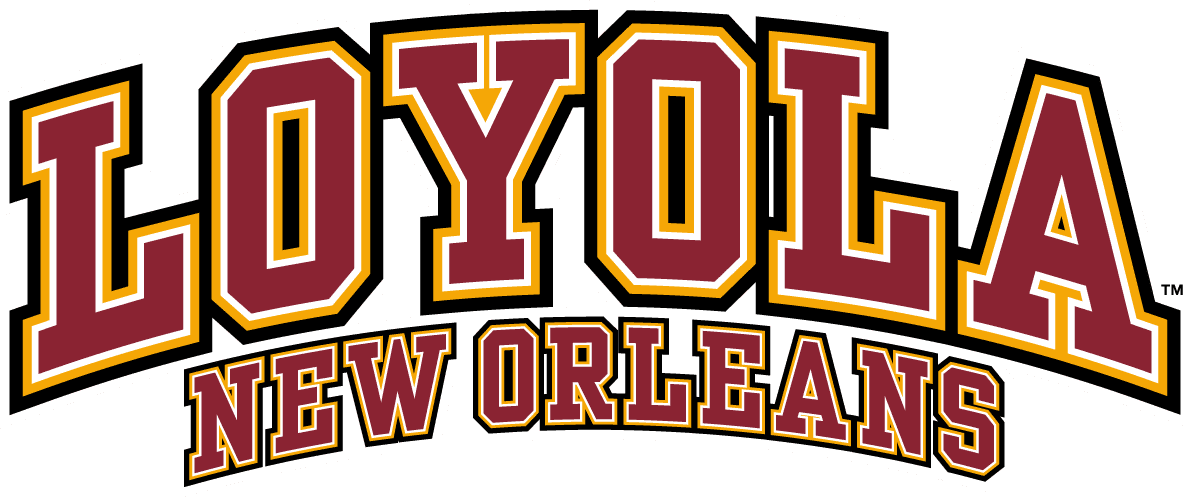
Loyola athletics wordmark

The Loyola athletic teams are called the Wolf Pack. The university is a member of the National Association of Intercollegiate Athletics (NAIA), primarily competing in the Southern States Athletic Conference (SSAC; formerly known as Georgia–Alabama–Carolina Conference (GACC) until after the 2003–04 school year) since the 2010–11 academic year. The Wolf Pack previously competed in the Gulf Coast Athletic Conference (GCAC) from 1995–96 to 2009–10.

Loyola competes in 18 intercollegiate varsity sports. Men's sports include baseball, basketball, cross country, golf, swimming, tennis and track & field; women's sports include basketball, cross country, golf, swimming, tennis, track & field and volleyball; and co-ed sports are competitive cheer, competitive dance and eSports.

== Notable faculty and alumni ==
Many notable politicians, entertainers, and figures in United States history are alumni of the university. These include current and former United States representatives, Louisiana state representatives and state senators, high ranking presidential United States Cabinet officials, a former head of state, federal and state judges, a recipient of the Presidential Medal of Freedom, former mayors, a restaurateur, news reporters, a former governor, actors, journalists, and numerous music celebrities, including G-Eazy and Harry Connick Jr.

The university is also home to a number of high-profile professors, including Harry Shearer, a voice actor for The Simpsons.

The university honours distinguished academics with "endowed professorships". In 2000, five people were recognised in this way: English Professor Katherine H. Adams, Music Professor Philip Frohnmayer, Business Professor Joseph Ganitsky, Music Professor David P. Swanzy, and English Professor Julian N. Wasserman. In 2023, a total of 40 academics had endowed chairs or professorships, including Edmondo Lupieri and Miguel H. Diaz.

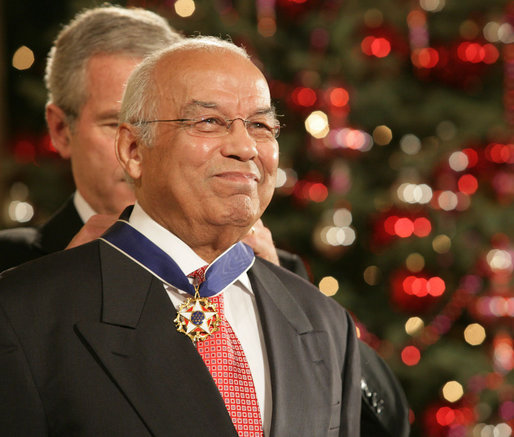
Norman Francis, president of Xavier University of Louisiana, recipient of Presidential Medal of Freedom, 2006

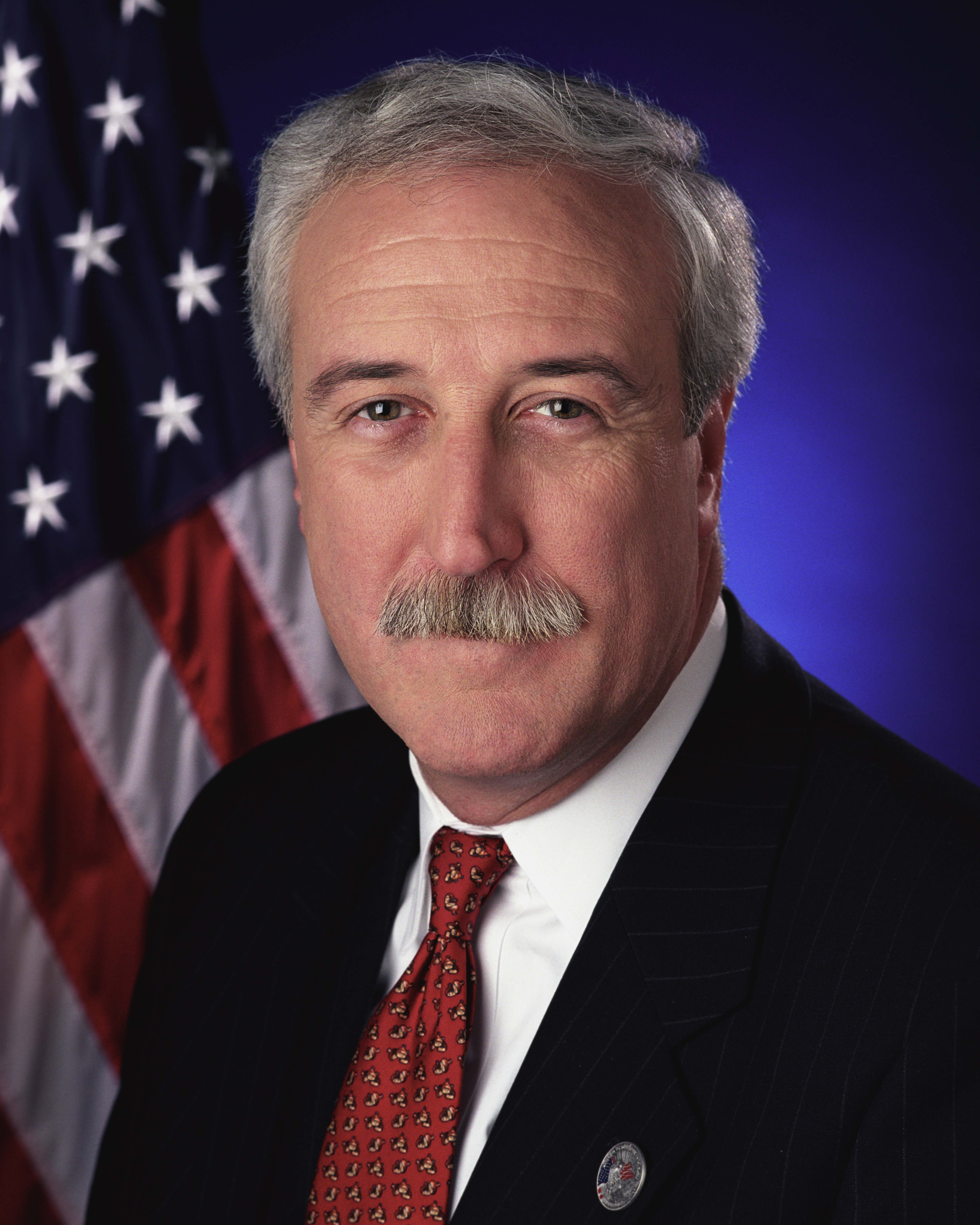
Sean O'Keefe, former Navy secretary, Louisiana State University chancellor, and NASA administrator

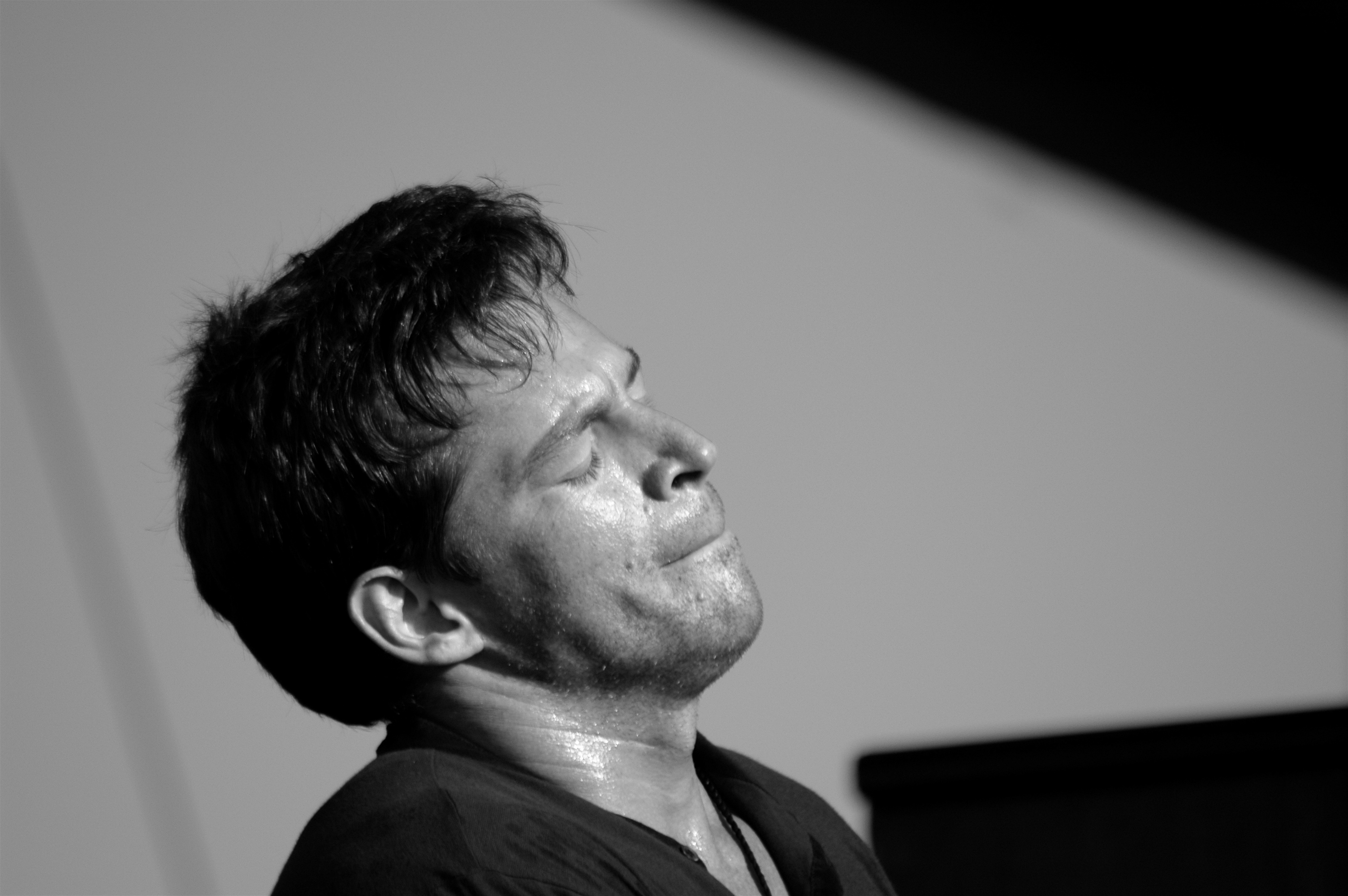
Harry Connick Jr., musician, actor, and humanitarian

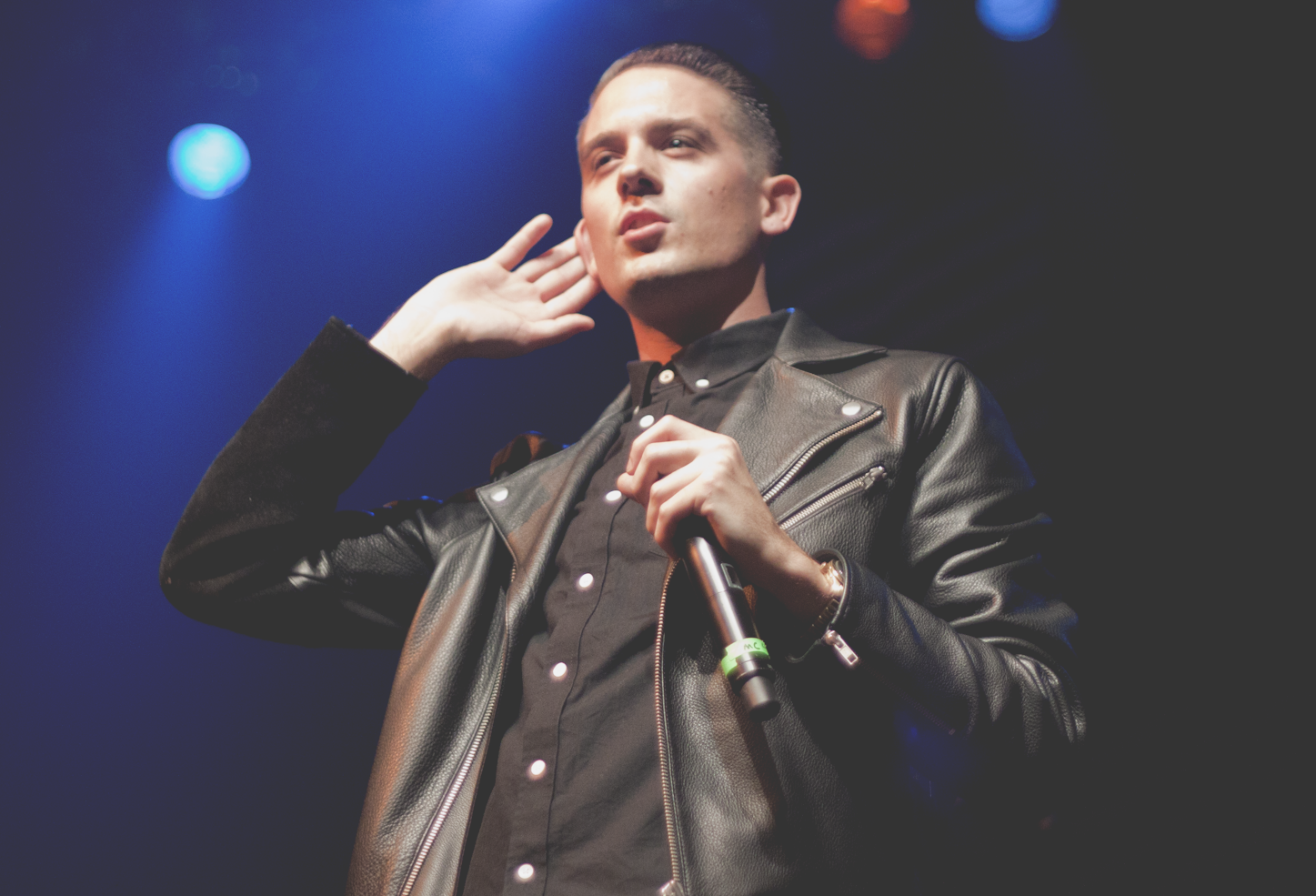
G-Eazy, musician, producer

== See also ==
- List of Jesuit sites
