= Jerry Kennelly =

Irish photojournalist

Jerry Kennelly is an Irish photojournalist and entrepreneur, and founder of Stockbyte and Tweak.com.

== Career ==
Kennelly started his career by working in his family's newspaper, Kerry's Eye, founded in 1974 by his parents, Pádraig Kennelly and Joan Kennelly, with his brothers, Padraig Jnr, Brendan and Kerry. Kennelly went on to start Newsfax in 1981 which was an independent news and photo agency serving Irish and international newspapers, magazines and broadcast media.

In 1996, Kennelly and a small team began working on the creation of Europe's first digital stock photography library. It was initially called Stockpix, later renamed Stockbyte. Stockbyte offered CDs containing 100 images launched at Macworld in San Francisco in January 1997. Two years later, Stockbyte offered online downloads of all its imagery.

Kennelly is the co-founder of several not-for-profit ventures in Ireland such as the Young Entrepreneur Programme, the Junior Entrepreneur Programme, and the Endeavour Programme. The Young Entrepreneur Programme ran for several years, during which over 5,000 teenagers took part and developed business plans under the mentorship of Ireland's entrepreneurs. The Endeavour Programme sought to help Irish start-up businesses which were mentored by leading entrepreneurs. Kennelly remains the co-founder and chairman of the Junior Entrepreneur Programme since 2010 which helps fifth and sixth class students in Ireland learn about entrepreneurship. 90,000 eleven and twelve year old children have started businesses in their classrooms as part of JEP since the programme began.

In 2011, Kennelly launched Tweak.com, for small and medium businesses to achieve graphic design and marketing materials through an online tool. In 2016, Kennelly launched Tweak Cloud which is an online application that allows brands to edit their brand assets online. Known today simply as Tweak, it has expanded into a self-service marketing application empowering brands and agencies to manage digital assets, brand templates, eCommerce merchandising and social media and integrating with their brand’s data, pricing and copy libraries.
