= Tweak =

Tweak or Tweaker may refer to:

== Computing ==
- Tweaking, the act of making small mechanical or electronic improvements
- Tweak programming environment, a graphical user interface layer for the Squeak development environment
- Tweak UI, a utility program for Microsoft Windows
- Tweakers, a Dutch technology website
- Tweak7, a Windows software tool

== Other ==
- Tweak (company), an Irish graphic design company
- Tweak (band), a South African musical group
- "Tweak" (song), by Girlset
- Tweaker (band), an American musical group
- "Tweaker" (song), by LiAngelo Ball
- Stereotypy, or tweaking, exhibiting compulsive or repetitive behaviour
- TWEAK, a cytokine encoded by the gene TNFSF12
- Tweak, a character filmed in Octonauts

== See also ==
- Tweek (disambiguation)
