= Ger Colleran =

Irish journalist

Gerard Colleran is an Irish journalist, the editor of the Irish Daily Star from 1999 to 2014, and since 2017 the editor of Kerry's Eye. In 2009, Village listed him as one of Ireland's 100 most influential people. He is a native of Mayo, County Mayo, grew up in Quin, County Clare, and was educated at the University of London and the University of Limerick. Prior to his work at the Daily Star he was the editor of The Kerryman from 1994 to 1999.
