= Kerry's Eye =

- Type: Weekly newspaper
- Format: Tabloid
- Owner: Webprint
- Founder(s): Pádraig and Joan Kennelly
- Editor: Ger Colleran
- Founded: 1974
- Language: English
- Headquarters: Ashe Street, Tralee, County Kerry, Ireland
- Circulation: c. 17,000 (print and digital, claimed) (as of 2026)
- ISSN: 1393-5682
- Website: Official website

Kerry's Eye is a weekly local newspaper in County Kerry, Ireland, published from Tralee every Thursday. It was founded in 1974 by Pádraig and Joan Kennelly and remained in the ownership of the Kennelly family until April 2026, when it was sold to the printing company Webprint. The paper has claimed a circulation of 25,000 in 2010 and weekly sales of just over 17,000 print and digital copies in 2026, in both cases without independent audit figures being cited.

== History ==
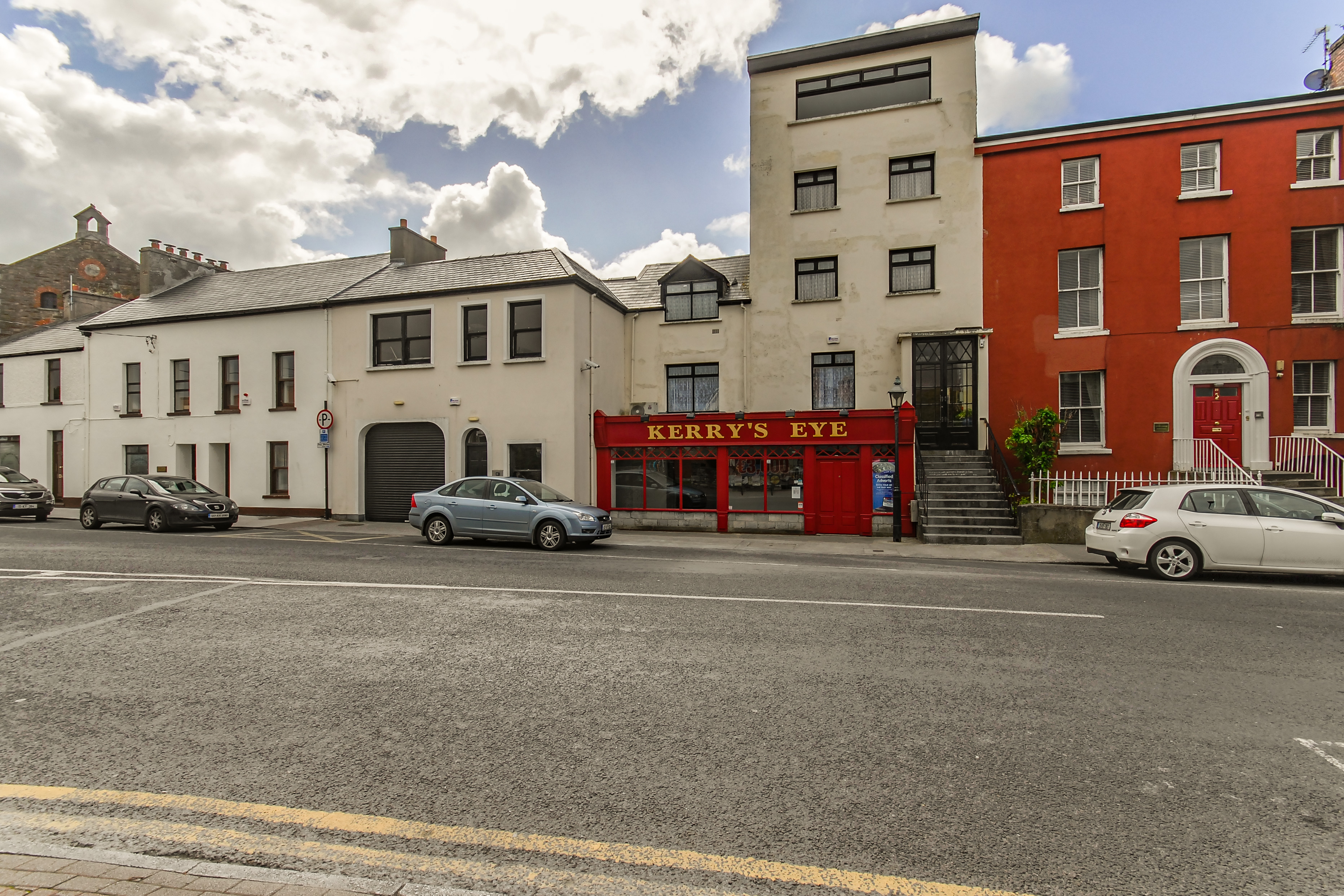
Ashe Street entrance of the Kerry's Eye newspaper office in 2015.

=== Foundation ===
Pádraig Kennelly was a pharmacist whose interest in photography developed into a photojournalism business with his wife, Joan Kennelly, who was also a photographer. Between 1953 and 1973 the couple took more than 500,000 photographs of life in Kerry; they were later digitised and collected in the Kennelly Archive, launched in 2009. In 1974 they founded Kerry's Eye in the basement of their home on Ashe Street in Tralee.

Pádraig Kennelly retired as the newspaper's editor in 2010 and was replaced by Kerry's Eye journalist Colin Lacey. Kennelly was the longest-serving editor of a regional newspaper in Ireland at the time of his retirement. He continued to write a weekly column until his death on 21 May 2011, at the age of 82.

=== Editorship and content ===
In October 2017 the former Star editor Ger Colleran was announced as the next editor of the paper, working alongside Lacey for a period before taking over in November. Colleran had been news editor and later editor of The Kerryman, the paper's main competitor. By then the paper had expanded its editions to south and north Kerry and covered courts, local news and sport with a small core of full-time and part-time reporters and columnists. According to RTÉ, an issue in 2026 ran to between 88 and 100 pages, including a 24-page sports pull-out.

Another local competitor, The Kingdom of Killarney, owned by Thomas Crosbie Holdings, ceased publication in 2011.

=== Premises and sale ===
In November 2022 the owners put the Ashe Street building and adjoining lands, a site of about 0.6 acres that includes the old Latchfords Mill, on the market through the estate agents Sherry FitzGerald Stephenson Crean. They said the paper used only a fraction of the space available and that they were looking at producing it from another location in Tralee.

In April 2026 the paper was sold to Webprint, described by RTÉ as the largest privately owned cold-set printing company in Ireland, for an undisclosed sum. Webprint, which is co-owned by Donagh and Jennifer O'Doherty, had printed the paper at its facility in Mahon, Cork, since 2017. Until the sale the paper had been owned by the founders' sons Pádraig, Brendan and Kerry Kennelly and its financial controller, Tom MacMahon. Pádraig and Brendan Kennelly were to remain actively involved, and Kerry Kennelly continued as picture editor. Pádraig Kennelly said the decision to sell was guided by the aim of securing the long-term future of the paper, which was 52 years old.

== Awards ==
Chief reporter Aidan O'Connor won the local print/online category at the Law Society of Ireland's Justice Media Awards for Kerry's Eye in 2021, for "Justice at last", and again in 2024, for an article on character references.
