= Tweek =

Tweek may refer to:

- Tweek (gamer), the handle of esports player Gavin Dempsey
- Tweek (South Park), a minor character on American TV series South Park
- An ortholog of the protein KIAA1109 in fruit flies, named for the South Park character

== See also ==
- Tweak (disambiguation)
