= Michael Kennelly =

The Reverend Michael F. Kennelly SJ

13th President of the Loyola University New Orleans
- In office 1970–1974
- Preceded by: Homer R. Jolley, S.J.
- Succeeded by: James C. Carter, S.J.

Personal details
- Born: May 22, 1914 Kilbaha, Ireland
- Died: January 3, 2011 (aged 96) New Orleans, Louisiana
- Education: Spring Hill College; National University of Ireland
- Profession: Jesuit priest, academic administrator

Michael F. Kennelly, S.J., (May 22, 1914 – January 3, 2011) was an Irish-born American Jesuit and academic administrator. He was a member of the Society of Jesus for more than seventy-seven years.

Kennelly served as the 13th president of Loyola University New Orleans from 1970 until 1974. He was also the founder of Strake Jesuit College Preparatory in Houston, Texas. Kennelly spent thirty-three of his years of his priesthood working in Tampa, Florida on three separate occasions.

== Biography ==
=== Early life ===
Kennelly was born on May 22, 1914, in Kilbaha, Moyvane, County Kerry, Ireland, to parents, Timothy and Mary Jane Kennelly, who resided in County Kerry. He had five brothers and four sisters. In 1929, his uncle invited him to attend high school in New York City. A second uncle, Rev. Patrick Ryan, further encouraged Kennelly to move to Mobile, Alabama, where he attended Spring Hill College, which had a high school on its campus at the time.

Kennelly entered the Society of Jesus, whose members are commonly known as the Jesuits, on June 9, 1933, at St. Charles College in Grand Coteau, Louisiana (Today, St. Charles College is now the Jesuit Spirituality Center at St. Charles College). He obtained his bachelor's degree in classics from Spring Hill College in 1939. He then studied at St. Mary's College, Kansas. He was ordained a Catholic priest within the Society of Jesus in 1946 while studying at St. Mary's College. Kennelly then returned to Ireland, where he received a master's degree in education in 1949 from the National University of Ireland.

Kennelly spent much of the 1940s as a postgraduate student while also working as a teacher and administrator at several Jesuit high schools. He first worked as a teacher at Jesuit High School in Tampa, Florida from 1940 until 1943. He left that position to pursue studies at St. Mary's College in Kansas. Kennelly was then appointed the principal of the former Jesuit High School in Shreveport, Louisiana, from 1948 until 1953.

=== Jesuit High School in Tampa ===
Kennelly returned to Jesuit High School in Tampa, where he served as the school's president and rector from 1953 to 1959. Kennelly spearheaded a $600,000 capital campaign to purchase 80 acres of rural farmland from a dairy rancher during his tenure as principal. The land acquisition allowed Jesuit High School to move from its former downtown Tampa location to the current campus, which is located on North Himes Avenue.

The Tampa Tribune called Kennelly the "founder" of the modern Jesuit High School campus in 2011. Kennelly designed Jesuit High School's campus with St. Anthony's chapel as its centerpiece.

=== Strake Jesuit College Preparatory ===
Kennelly founded Strake Jesuit College Preparatory in Houston, Texas. He served as the school's president and rector from 1959 until 1970, when he departed to become president of Loyola University New Orleans.

=== President of Loyola University New Orleans (1970–1974) ===
Kennelly served as the 13th President of Loyola University New Orleans. The new home of the Loyola University New Orleans College of Law was constructed during Kennelly's tenure in office. Kennelly also established the President's Council, which consisted of a group of business executives who contributed their professional experience to the university. Kennelly was a fervent opponent of recreational drugs on campus, telling the Times-Picayune in a 1974 interview that, "I've done everything in my power to wipe them from the campus, and I think I've been successful."

Kennelly stepped down as President of the university in 1974 at the age of 59, saying it was time for a younger leader, according to The Times-Picayune. He was succeeded as president by Father James C. Carter, S.J., who had been the university's provost before his promotion.

=== Florida ===
Father Kennelly became the assistant pastor of Gesu Church in downtown Miami, Florida, after leaving the Loyola presidency. Kennelly served at Gesu Church from 1974 until 1975.

Kennelly returned to Tampa in 1980, where he would live and work for twenty-two years. He became the associate pastor of Sacred Heart Catholic Church in Tampa, Florida from 1980 to 1982. He was further elevated to pastor-superior of Sacred Heart Catholic Church from 1982 until 1990. Kennelly publicly supported the opening a St. Francis House, an outreach center founded by Franciscan Sister Anne Dougherty to provide support for people with AIDS and HIV, in 1988.

Kennelly returned once again to Jesuit High School in Tampa, Florida, serving as its rector and vice president from 1990 until 1997. He then returned to Sacred Heart Church in Tampa, as the pastor emeritus and Jesuit provincial vicar from 1997 until 2002.

=== Later life ===
Kennelly moved to Ignatius Residence, a Jesuit retirement community located in the Algiers neighborhood of New Orleans, in 2003.

Father Michael Kennelly died at the Ignatius Residence in Algiers, New Orleans, Louisiana, on January 3, 2011, at the age of 96. He was the oldest Jesuit priest in the Society of Jesus' New Orleans province at the time of his death. Kennelly was survived by his sister, Mary Jane Coulon, and brother, Timothy Kennelly. A funeral mass was said on January 7, 2011, at the Most Holy Name of Jesus Church in New Orleans. Kennelly was buried at St. Charles College in Grand Coteau, Louisiana.
