= Norman Francis =

American academic (1931–2026)

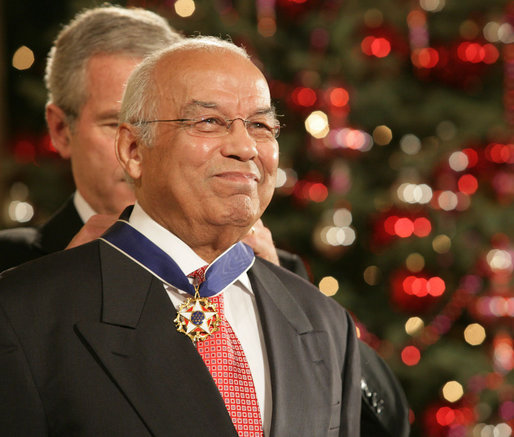
- Francis receives Presidential Medal of Freedom, 2006, from George W. Bush
- Born: Norman Christopher Francis; March 20, 1931; Lafayette, Louisiana, U.S.
- Died: February 18, 2026 (aged 94); Jefferson, Louisiana, U.S.
- Education: Xavier University of Louisiana (BS); Loyola University New Orleans (JD)
- Occupation: Lawyer
- Employer: Xavier University of Louisiana
- Known for: First Black student at Loyola University New Orleans; first lay president of Xavier.
- Board member of: UNCF, ETS
- Awards: Presidential Medal of Freedom

Norman Christopher Francis (March 20, 1931 – February 18, 2026) was an American academic who served as president of Xavier University of Louisiana from 1968 to 2015. He was the first Black and first lay president of the school, and the second African American to ever serve as president of a Catholic university in the United States.

Francis also served as the chairman of the Louisiana Recovery Authority, the state agency in charge of planning the recovery and rebuilding of Louisiana after Hurricane Katrina and Hurricane Rita. For his various avenues of service, he received the Presidential Medal of Freedom from George W. Bush in 2006, and the Laetare Medal from the University of Notre Dame in 2019. He received 35 honorary degrees from colleges and universities around the country.

== Early life ==
Francis was born in Lafayette, Louisiana, the son of poor parents, neither of whom had finished high school. His father was a barber who rode to work each day on a bicycle because the family did not own a car. He earned pocket money by shining shoes on Lafayette's main street.

His parents felt that Francis, his three sisters and his brother needed an education. Norman and his brother and sisters attended Catholic schools and his parents saw to it that the children rarely missed school. "I had to have a fever, and really be ill before I dared to try to miss school," he said. His parents also made certain that the children attended Mass on Sunday and were punctual in their religious duties. His brother, Joseph Abel Francis, would later become an auxiliary bishop who retired from active ministry in 1995 and died in 1997.

After he graduated from St. Paul High School in 1948, he turned his interest toward the military, but because of the interest of one of the teaching sisters at St. Paul High School, Francis found himself with a work scholarship to Xavier University in New Orleans.

The "work" part of this scholarship landed him in the university library, where he repaired damaged books. By his senior year he had worked himself up to night supervisor of library services. Francis was an honor student and was president of his class all four years. In his senior year he was chosen the president of the student body.. Francis earned a B.S. degree from the university in 1952. He then became the first African-American to enroll at Loyola University New Orleans, where he attended the Loyola University Law School for his J.D., a degree he received in 1955.

He said that one reason that he was accepted was because he had been active in the National Federation of Catholic Colleges, where he became acquainted with several of the Jesuit fathers on the Loyola University faculty. Francis graduated from Loyola with honors with a Doctor of Jurisprudence degree in 1955 and he began to practice law. He soon decided that the law was not for him. "I could have made a great deal of money," he said later, "but I could help only a few people. The future belongs to those who are educated, so I turned to education."

== Career ==
Francis served in the United States Army from 1956 to 1957 and became a specialist 4. He then rejoined the U.S. Attorney's Office to help integrate federal agencies. About that same time, Francis acted as counsel for the Xavier student body president, Rudolph Lombard, who had been arrested for attempting to integrate the lunch counter at McCrory's on Canal Street in New Orleans. It was those experiences that led him to choose the path of education over that of a law career.

During the turbulent times early on in the Civil Rights Movement, he returned to Xavier. Because of his scholastic record, the Sisters of the Blessed Sacrament, the religious order which conducts Xavier University, offered him the post of dean of men, which he accepted.

In 1961, while dean of men, he played a key role in Xavier's decision to house the Freedom Riders, an integrated group testing application of the Supreme Court decision banning discrimination in interstate rail and bus travel, in a campus dormitory when they were flown to New Orleans by Federal Marshals after having been attacked in three Alabama cities (Anniston, Birmingham and Montgomery).

From dean of men in 1957, Francis advanced to director of student personnel services in 1963, assistant to the president for student affairs in 1964, assistant to the president in charge of development in 1965 and executive vice president in 1967.

In 1968, the Sisters of the Blessed Sacrament promoted him to the post of president of the university, the first lay, male and black head of the university. Coincidentally, he accepted the presidency at Xavier on the same day, April 4, as the assassination of Martin Luther King Jr. in Memphis.

During the following 40 years, Francis guided Xavier University's growth in both size and dimension. The university has more than tripled its enrollment, broadened its curriculum and expanded its campus. At Xavier, Francis presided over a major expansion of campus facilities and enrollment growth of 35 percent.

On September 2, 2014, Francis announced his plan to retire from his post as Xavier's president in June 2015 after serving the university in this capacity for 47 years.

== Personal life and death ==
Francis was married to his wife Blanche from 1955 until her death in 2015. They had six children.

He was invested as a Knight of Malta in 1991, and was a member of Alpha Phi Alpha fraternity.

Francis died at Ochsner Hospital in Jefferson, Louisiana, on February 18, 2026, at the age of 94.

== Affiliations ==
Francis served as president of the United Negro College Fund and chairman of the board of directors of the Southern Association of Colleges and Schools and Educational Testing System and of the Southern Education Foundation. He was a member of the National Commission on Excellence in Education, the National Advisory Research Council of the US Department of Health and Human Resources, and the National Assessment of Higher Education Program.

He was a member of the Vatican's Pontifical Council for Justice and Peace, the advisory board of the Josephites, the executive committee of the college and University Department of the National Catholic Educational Association, the Board of Trustees of the Catholic University of America, the Board of Regents of Loyola University, and the board of directors of the National Catholic Council for Interracial Justice.

== Honors and awards ==
Francis was chairman of the board of Educational Testing Service, The Carnegie Foundation for the Advancement of Teaching and the Southern Education Foundation, and president of the American Association of Higher Education and the United Negro College Fund.

He was also a fellow of the American Academy of Arts and Sciences, received 35 honorary degrees, and was named among the 100 most effective college presidents in a poll published in the Chronicle of Higher Education.

In December 2006, Francis was awarded the Presidential Medal of Freedom.

On November 21, 2008, in New Orleans at the Ernest N. Morial Convention Center, Francis celebrated his 40th year as President of Xavier University at the 40th Anniversary Gala, themed "Legacy for a Legend". The event was hosted by Bill Cosby, and featured a performance by Grammy winner Gladys Knight.

On May 19, 2019, Francis received the University of Notre Dame's 2019 Laetare Medal at Notre Dame's 174th University Commencement Ceremony.

After the George Floyd protests of 2020, the city of New Orleans renamed a street in Francis's honor. The thoroughfare, named for Jefferson Davis (the president of the Confederacy), was renamed to Norman C. Francis Parkway, effective January 1, 2021. The road runs by the southern end of Xavier.

Selected Community Honors & Awards Received by Dr. Norman C. Francis

- Knight Commanders of the Order of St. Gregory – conferral of Papal Honor by His Holiness Pope John Paul II – January 29, 2000
- "From Whence We Came" Award – All State Insurance – February 25, 1999
- Whitney M. Young Jr. Award – Boy Scouts of America, New Orleans Area Council – December 2, 1998
- St. Martin de Porres Social Justice Award – given by the Southern Dominican Friars Province – November 17, 1998
- Junior Achievement Business Hall of Fame, 1998 Laureate – May 8, 1998
- Pioneer in Education Award (1994) – Institute for Independent Education, Washington, D.C. – October 1, 1994
- The Times Picayune Loving Cup of 1991 – Awarded annually to New Orleans citizens who have worked unselfishly for the community without expectation of public recognition or material award.
- Adjutor Hominum Award – Loyola University New Orleans, President's Council – October 1991
- Benjamin Smith Award – American Civil Liberties Union Foundation of Louisiana – 1990
- Hornblower of the Year – New Orleans Chapter of Public Relations Society of America – June 1990
- National Alumni Council of UNCF's Distinguished Service Award – February 17, 1989
- Weiss Brotherhood Award – New Orleans Chapter of the National Association of Christians and Jews – November 10, 1988
- Friends of Public Education Award – United Teachers of New Orleans – April 25, 1987
- 10th Annual Integritas Vitae Award – Loyola University – 1986
- Jefferson Parish School Board Award - February 25, 1986
- Whitney M. Young Jr. Award – Urban League of Greater New Orleans – 1982
- Monte M. Lemann Award – Louisiana Civil Service League – July 12, 1974
- Torch of Liberty Award – Anti-Defamation League – December 11, 1971

Honorary Degrees from Colleges and Universities

- Villanova University (Pennsylvania) – Doctor of Education, 1969
- College of the Holy Cross (Massachusetts) – Doctor of Laws, 1969
- Seton Hall University (New Jersey) – Doctor of Humane Letters, 1969
- St. Michaels College (Vermont) – Doctor of Laws, 1972
- Marquette University (Wisconsin) – Doctor of Laws, 1977
- St. Peter's College (New Jersey) – Doctor of Humane Letters, 1977
- Tulane University (New Orleans) – Doctor of Laws, 1980
- Loyola University (New Orleans) – Doctor of Laws, 1982
- Hamline University (Minnesota) – Doctor of Laws, 1983
- University of Pennsylvania (Pennsylvania) – Doctor of Laws, 1983
- Miami University (Ohio) – Doctor of Laws, 1985
- The Catholic University of America (District of Columbia) – Doctor of Laws, 1986
- Hunter College (New York) – Doctor of Humane Letters, 1988
- St. Vincent College (Pennsylvania) – Doctor of Humane Letters, 1988
- University of Notre Dame (Indiana) – Doctor of Laws, 1988
- Johns Hopkins University (Maryland) – Doctor of Humane Letters, 1988
- Drexel University (Pennsylvania) – Doctor of Humane Letters, 1990
- New York Medical College (New York) – Doctor of Humane Letters, 1992
- Rutgers University (New Jersey) – Doctor of Humane Letters, 1993
- University of Portland (Oregon) – Doctor of Laws, 1994
- Wheelock College (Massachusetts) – Doctor of Education, 1995
- Notre Dame Seminary (New Orleans) – Doctor of Letters, 1995
- Xavier University (Ohio) – Doctor of Humanities, 1998
- Our Lady of the Holy Cross College (New Orleans) – Doctor of Humane Letters, 1998
- Felician College (New Jersey) – Doctor of Humane Letters, 1998
