= Green Light New Orleans =

US nonprofit organization

Green Light New Orleans (GLNO) is a nonprofit organization based in New Orleans, Louisiana. The environmentally conscious organization works to reduce carbon emissions through the replacement of traditional, non-environmentally friendly bulbs with compact fluorescent lights (CFLs). Ultimately, the organization aims to remove all of the city's incandescent lights and replace them with CFL lights.

== History ==
New Orleans' low elevation and proximity to the Gulf of Mexico dubs it a high-risk flood zone, susceptible to the major effects of global warming. These risks became reality in summer of 2005, as levee failures compounded the devastation of Hurricane Katrina. Local New Orleans musician Andi Hoffmann and his band B-Goes founded Green Light New Orleans in response to this environmental disaster.

The band began by calculating the carbon output resultant of their tours and figured how many Compact Fluorescent Light bulbs (CFLs) would offset this output. For each European concert ticket attendees were asked to donate toward the cause. With overwhelming responses, the band returned to the United States and immediately established the organization.

== Mission ==
The city of New Orleans is greatly endangered by the negative repercussions of global warming. Global warming has been alleged to intensify the magnitude of tropical storms and hurricanes. Wasteful energy consumption is perhaps the largest contributor to global warming. Green Light strives to reduce energy consumption and mitigate carbon emissions through the installation of energy efficient bulbs. The ultimate objective of the organization is to remove all of the city's incandescent light bulbs and replace them with compact fluorescent lamps, which require 66 to 75 percent less electricity and last 8,000 to 10,000 hours longer.

Bulbs are supplied to homeowners and renters free of charge and are installed by the organization's volunteers. By having volunteers conduct installations, bulbs get put to immediate use. Therefore, beneficiary families immediately reduce their energy consumption and carbon emissions while also saving on utility bills. Within four years, Green Light New Orleans plans to replace all of the approximately 3 million incandescent bulbs in New Orleans residences with CFLs. GLNO has expanded outside of New Orleans. Currently, GLNO is also operating in Gramercy, Louisiana, and has another branch in upstate South Carolina (Green Light South Carolina). The organization hopes to create national awareness of its positive impacts and that similar initiatives will be adopted in other U.S. cities.

== Volunteer program ==
Volunteer efforts of Green Light New Orleans, April 3, 2010

Green Light New Orleans solicits volunteers from social activist groups such as AmeriCorps, universities, corporations, and individuals interested in being a part of green program.

Involvement with AmeriCorps*NCCCs, AmeriCorps*Delta Direct, and AmeriCorps*VISTA

AmeriCorps Being that Green Light is a young and very small non-profit, the organization utilizes the dedication of AmeriCorps volunteers for its daily operations, project coordination, and developmental ventures. There are three branches of AmeriCorps - State and National Delta Direct service members, NCCC (the National Civilian Community Corps), and VISTA (Volunteers in Service to America)- and Green Light depends on volunteers from all three branches.

== Rebuilding and education ==
Green Light educates New Orleanians with the environmental awareness needed to combat the effects of global warming; this effort not only rebuilds, but also revitalizes New Orleans through efficiency and sustainability. The free service reduces utility costs and carbon emissions simultaneously by switching low and fixed income households to energy efficient lighting. Volunteers visit the homes of New Orleans' residents and, together, they install CFLs. Green Light's strategy founds a connection between volunteers and residents that immediately puts the bulbs to use and the community dynamic into reformation.

== See also ==
- Environment of the United States
