= Christy Kenneally =

Irish writer, speaker, and TV presenter

Christy Kenneally (born 1948) is an Irish author, speaker, poet, TV presenter and scriptwriter. He is well known for his books and lectures on the subject of bereavement and dealing with loss.

== Biography ==
Kenneally was born in 1948 in Cork, Ireland. He received his Bachelor of Arts degree from the National University of Ireland and a Bachelor of Divinity from the Pontifical University of Maynooth. After graduating, he started a management training company and some of his clients have included Lotus, Motorola, Analog Devices, the Mars Corporation, and IBM.

Kenneally has worked on documentaries as both a scriptwriter and commentator. His documentary Na Déithe Caillte (The Lost Gods), was televised on TG4 and Channel 4. It explored the religions of the world and how their art, architecture, and cultures influenced empires over time. He has also presented many other television documentaries and travel programs including "Decoding Christianity," "Heaven on Earth," and "No Frontiers." Kenneally has filmed in documentaries in places such as Bangladesh, Ethiopia, Indonesia, Mali, Kenya, Egypt and Mexico.

Kenneally is also a poet. On 11 December 2011, a line from a poem he wrote called "Dear Parents", was inscribed on a plaque and placed in Glasnevin Cemetery in Dublin in remembrance of the children laid to rest at the "angels" plot. It reads: "If you would honour me then strive to live in love, for in that love I live." He read his poem at the plaque's unveiling during the annual Christmas remembrance and tree lighting ceremony that honours thousands of infant deaths and still birthed babies that have been laid to rest in the cemetery.

Kenneally has written a number of books ranging from the subject of bereavement to mystery thrillers. He is very passionate on the subjects of bereavement support, suicide prevention and postvention, mental health reform, and positive ageing to name a few. He has said "I believe there is no point in developing great policies and strategies if we don't implement them. One death by suicide is one too many. Yet every year hundreds of our citizens die by suicide and many more attempt suicide. If you take that number and consider the ripples of heartbreak that extend through families, friends, work colleagues, club mates and local communities, you get some idea of the ocean of hurt and pain that surrounds us."

Kenneally is married to Linda Finnegan, a Clinical Psychologist and Psychotherapist. They currently live in Wicklow and have two children.

== Bibliography ==
- The Remnant: A Novel (1 October 2006)
- Life After Loss: How to Help the Bereaved (31 December 1999)
- The Betrayed (4 August 2011)
- Tears of God (30 July 2012)
- Say Yes to Life: Discover Your Pathways to Happiness and Well-Being (23 May 2013)
- Sons of Cain (18 July 2013)
- Maura's Boy: A Cork Childhood (1996)
- The New Curate (1997)
