= Tweak (company) =

Tweak is an Irish-owned business, founded in 2008 by Jerry Kennelly. Kennelly is an entrepreneur from County Kerry who developed Stockbyte, which was acquired by Getty Images in 2006. Kennelly began developing Tweak two years after Stockbyte was acquired by Getty Images and was officially launched in 2011.

Tweak's headquarters are in Killorglin in County Kerry, Ireland. There are also offices in both County Dublin and New York.

There are two categories of services – Tweak and Tweak Cloud, which was launched in 2016.

Online printers use Tweak's services to provide their customers with designs. These printers include Helloprint, Flyeralarm and Druck.at.

Tweak is a free service for small and medium business.

Tweak Cloud was launched in 2016. Tweak Cloud is designed to be one platform for all of a business's digital assets for marketing in up to seven languages.

Tweak is Kennelly's second business, after Stockbyte.

== Stockbyte ==
Stockbyte was Europe's first digital stock photography library, founded by Jerry Kennelly in 1996.

Stockbyte was originally called Stockpix and was later renamed. Stockbyte originally offered CDs containing 100 images relating to a particular theme. The first products were launched at Macworld in San Francisco in January 1997. Two years later, Stockbyte and its partners offered online downloads of all of its imagery.

Stockbyte went on to work with partner agencies who licensed their images. Magazines such as Time and Newsweek carried its images on their covers and global organisations like McDonald's, Blue Cross and the Federal Bureau of Investigation licensed their imagery.

Stockbyte used business intelligence software to measure performance of images by genre in order to react of changing user demands and to capture the most important images.

In 2004, Kennelly and his team created a second brand called Stockdisc, which made images available at a lower price to Stockbyte.

In April 2006, both brands were acquired by Getty Images for $135 million. The unsuccessful bidders were Bill Gates' company Corbis and Jupiterimages Corporation.

Kennelly has since gone on to found Tweak, as mentioned above.
