= Irish Daily Star =

Newspaper

- Type: Daily newspaper
- Format: Irish Tabloid
- Owner: Reach plc
- Publisher: Reach plc
- Editor: Neil Leslie
- Founded: 29 February 1988
- Headquarters: Independent House, Talbot Street, Dublin 1, Ireland
- Circulation: 21,940 (as of May 2023)
- Website: thestar.ie and buzz.ie

The Irish Daily Star (formerly known simply as The Star) is a tabloid newspaper published in Ireland by Reach plc, which owns the British Daily Star.

The Irish Daily Star became known for its comprehensive in-depth coverage of and thorough focus on crime, often featuring sensational coverage. It also focuses heavily on celebrity matters, and has a large sports section. Between 2003 and 2011, a Sunday edition was published, as Irish Daily Star Sunday. Like its British tabloid counterpart, the Irish Daily Star has a red-top mast head.

== History ==
First published on 29 February 1988, nominally the paper was the Irish version of the UK tabloid Daily Star. It did, however, contain more Irish content than any similar Irish editions of the UK national newspapers. The tabloid had strong nationalist leanings, claiming on its slogan to be "Better... because we're Irish".

The newspaper's offices were located in Terenure, Dublin 6W, until November 2010. They then relocated to Building 4 of the Dundrum Town Centre complex. The Star employs 70 staff directly. The controlling editor of the paper for many years was Gerard Colleran, who often appears on television programmes such as Tonight with Vincent Browne. Michael O'Kane took over from Colleran as editor of the Irish Daily Star on 25 November 2011. Colleran then became managing director of the tabloid. In September 2012 the newspaper published topless photographs (taken in France) of Kate Middleton. O'Kane, as editor, defended the publication but was later suspended and proprietor Richard Desmond threatened to close down the Irish operation.

In September 2018, Reach plc, publisher of the Mirror, acquired the 50% stake formally owned by Northern & Shell.

In April 2020, the editor Eoin Brannigan left the Irish Daily Star.

In July 2020, it was announced that Independent News & Media had reached an agreement to sell their 50% stake in Independent Star to Reach plc. The agreement is subject to competition authority approval and is expected to close in late 2020.

In November 2020, the acquisition of the 50% stake owned by Independent News & Media was approved by the regulator and the minister.

== Content ==
While the Daily Star (UK) focuses almost exclusively on celebrity content, the Irish Daily Star includes mostly coverage of Irish issues and sport.

In Northern Ireland, The Irish Star features a green masthead, in order to distinguish it from the UK version which is also sold there. It also differs from the Irish Daily Star in that it features more news about Northern Ireland.

In the United States, the Irish Star features a green masthead, and features news about Ireland. IrishStar.com began in February 2023 using the tagline, The Voice of Irish America.

== Circulation ==
According to the Audit Bureau of Circulations, Ireland, the average daily circulation of the Irish Daily Star:

Year (period)	Average circulation per issue
2003 (January to December)	110,000
2005 (January to June)	108,221
2006 (January to June)	102,884
2007 (January to June)	80,349
2012 (January to June)	75,293
2012 (November)	69,017
2012 (December)	66,941
2013 (April)	60,715
2017 (July)	49,100
2017 (December)	48,686
2018 (July to December)	44,233
2019 (January to June)	41,648
2019 (July to December)	38,341
2020 (January)	35,947
2020 (May)	32,168
2023 (February)	22,490
2023 (May)	21,940
2023 (June)	21,407
2023 (November)	20,492
2023 (December)	20,101

== Business ==
The 2011 accounts showed that The Irish Daily Star made a profit of €1.44 million for 2011, this was down 63% year-on-year. Revenue was down 20% year-on-year. The company shed 20 staff in 2011, bringing its employment to 118.

Staffing numbers were down to 110 in January 2013, with 80 of those posts full-time and 9 job cuts pending.

Staff numbers reduced to 50 by 31 December 2017.

== Kate Middleton photographs and subsequent reorganisation (2012/2013) ==
The Irish Daily Star published controversial topless pictures of Catherine Middleton on 15 September 2012. St James's Palace said there could be "no motivation for this action other than greed". Editor Michael O'Kane defended the publication, saying to the BBC: "I did this as a service to our readers, I'm a little taken aback by the reaction in the UK. It only seems to be an issue in the UK because she is your future queen. But from our point of view in Ireland, Kate Middleton is just another of the fantastic line of celebrities".

In response to the publication of the topless photographs of Kate Middleton, later that day Northern & Shell, the co-owner of the Irish Daily Star, announced it was "taking immediate steps to close down the joint venture".

On 17 September 2012, editor Michael O'Kane was suspended pending an investigation into the matter. The following day, it was reported that the "Northern & Shell company was indicating that the company's focus was on exiting the publishing joint venture" rather than closure specifically. It was subsequently reported, that the contract between Northern & Shell and Independent News & Media allows either one of them to give notice of an intention to withdraw and that lawyers from Northern & Shell were trying to extricate Desmond's company from the agreement.

On 24 November 2012, Michael O'Kane resigned as editor of the Irish Daily Star. The same day, The Telegraph reported that IN&M and N&S were working together "to secure the future of the newspaper" and that there was "no change to the status of the 25-year-old joint venture" but that there will be further changes, to be announced in the future, at the paper. The following day, The Sunday Times reported that the changes will be "rationalisation" in nature and would be announced over the coming weeks.

On 10 January 2013, the reorganisation was announced. IN&M assumed full executive responsibility for the Irish Daily Star. These included pay cuts for all staff, nine staff redundancies and cost cuts of overheads. The Irish Daily Star will relocate to Talbot Street in Dublin from its current offices in Dundrum. Gerry Lennon has been appointed managing director of the Irish Daily Star in addition to his existing role of managing director of the Sunday World.

== Editors ==
- Eoin Brannigan (2017–2020)
- Des Gibson (2014 – 2017)
- Gerard Colleran (until 2011 and 2014)
- Michael O'Kane (2011–2012)
- Neil Leslie (2020 – present day)

== Contributors ==
Authors such as Donn McCleann, Gary O'Brien and Derek Foley feature on the paper's websites.

== Notes ==
1. Michael O'Kane suspended as editor on 17 September 2012 following his decision to publish topless photographs of Catherine Middleton
