= Paul Kennelly =

Australian rules footballer

Personal information
- Full name: Paul Kennelly
- Born: 27 February 1947 (age 79)
- Original team: Middle Park YCW
- Height: 180 cm (5 ft 11 in)
- Weight: 73 kg (161 lb)

Playing career^{1}
Years	Club	Games (Goals)
1967	South Melbourne	1 (0)
- ^{1} Playing statistics correct to the end of 1967.

Paul Kennelly (born 27 February 1947) is a former Australian rules footballer who played with South Melbourne in the Victorian Football League (VFL).
