= Kevin Wildes (priest) =

Kevin William Wildes, S.J. (born September 27, 1954) is an American priest of the Catholic Church who was president of Loyola University New Orleans from 2004 to 2018.

== Biography ==
Prior to joining the Jesuits, Wildes was a boxer, a sport he continued as an amateur and a teacher. Wildes entered the Society of Jesus in 1976, and was ordained a priest in 1986, completing his vows in March 2004. He holds advanced degrees in theology from the Weston Jesuit School of Theology in Cambridge, Massachusetts, and in philosophy from Fordham University and Rice University, where he received his Ph.D. in 1993. He worked at Georgetown University where he was a chaplain in residence, beginning his tradition of living in the student residences, and an important advocate for fund raising for the school. His weekly informal masses in his residence attracted a loyal following among students.

He was installed as Loyola's 16th president on July 1, 2004.

During his second year in the position, he was charged with seeing the school through Hurricane Katrina. On April 10, 2006, President Wildes unveiled Pathways - Toward Our Second Century, Loyola's strategic plan in response to the university's 15 million dollar budget deficit following Hurricane Katrina. The proposal restructured the academic colleges of Loyola and included program and personnel cuts. The Pathways plan encountered opposition from the university community. The Board of Trustees however unanimously approved and passed the plan in a meeting on May 19, 2006. On 26 September 2006, the faculty of the College of Humanities and Natural Sciences, the largest college, voted "no confidence" in President Wildes with 76% of voting faculty supporting the measure.

In August 2017, he informed Loyola's trustees that he would step down as president in June 2018.

As an author, he has published numerous works on ethics and morality, especially in the field of bioethics which he has lectured widely on. He has been called upon to give analysis on bioethics issues on nightly talk shows in Washington, and on July 22, 1997 to testify before the House Committee on Sciences on the topic of human cloning. He is Associate Director and a Senior Research Scholar at the Kennedy Institute of Ethics and frequent contributor to its journal. He served as an editor of four compendiums of bioethics essays, such as Choosing Life: A Dialogue on Evangelium Vitae. In 2000, he published Moral Acquaintances: Methodology in Bioethics.

== Writings ==
- Moral Acquaintances: Methodology in Bioethics. South Bend: University of Notre Dame Press; 2000. ISBN 0-268-03452-4.
