= Pádraig Kennelly =

Pádraig Kennelly (10 February 1929 – 21 May 2011) was an Irish journalist, editor, photographer, cameraman and publisher, who co-founded and edited the Kerry's Eye newspaper.

Kennelly originally began his career as a pharmacist. His interest in photography led him to pursue a career in photojournalism with his wife, Joan Kennelly. Together, Pádraig and Joan Kennelly took more than 500,000 photographs of daily life in County Kerry between 1953 and 1973. The photographs were subsequently digitised and published as a book. The collection was permanently collected into the Kennelly Archive, which was launched in 2009.

In 1974, Pádraig and Joan co-founded the Kerry's Eye in the basement of their home on Ashe Street in Tralee, County Kerry. He remained the paper's editor until his retirement in 2010. Kennelly was the longest serving editor of a regional Irish newspaper at the time of his retirement. He continued to write a weekly column until his death in 2011. The newspaper then had a circulation of approximately 25,000.

In early May 2011, Kennelly, though in poor health, travelled to the Irish Cultural Institute in Paris for the opening of an exhibition of the Kennellys' photographs documenting the 1969 visit of Charles de Gaulle to Ireland. Many of the photographs on display were taken by his late wife, Joan, including a photograph which was published on the front page of Paris Match.

He died at his home in Tralee, County Kerry, on 21 May 2011, at the age of 82. He was survived by his four sons: Pádraig J. Kennelly, Jerry, Brendan and Kerry. He was predeceased by his wife, photographer Joan Kennelly. His funeral mass was held at St John's Catholic Church and he was buried at Rath cemetery, outside Tralee.
