= Joan Kennelly =

Irish photographer

- Died: 2007
- Known for: Photography

Joan Kennelly (died 2007) was an Irish photographer, photojournalist and founder of the regional newspaper, Kerry's Eye.

Kennelly and her husband, Pádraig Kennelly, took more than 500,000 photographs of daily life in County Kerry between 1953 and 1973. The collection has been digitized and published as the Kennelly Archive in 2009. Joan and Pádraig Kennelly co-founded the Kerry's Eye newspaper in the basement of their home on Ashe Street in Tralee, County Kerry, in 1974.

In May 2011, an exhibition of the Kennellys' photographs documenting the visit of Charles de Gaulle and his wife, Yvonne de Gaulle, to Ireland in 1969 opened at the Irish Cultural Institute in Paris, France. Many of the most famous photographs on display were taken by Joan Kennelly. These included a photo of Charles de Gaulle standing over a kneeling congregation at a mass in Sneem, County Kerry. This particular picture was published on the front page of the French magazine, Paris Match. She died in 2007.
