= Ernley Blackwell =

Sir Ernley Robertson Hay Blackwell KCB (6 June 1868 – 21 September 1941) was a British lawyer and career civil servant. As chief legal advisor to the Cabinet, Blackwell was involved in the prosecution of Roger Casement, and authorised the circulation of his disputed Black Diaries.

== Early life ==
Blackwell was born on 6 June 1868 in St Andrews, Fife, Scotland, the youngest son of Surgeon-Major James Hay Blackwell, H.E.I.C.S., and his wife, Eliza Jane Robertson (a daughter of Andrew Robertson (d. 1868), of the Madras Civil Service, a member of a Scots gentry family; from whom Blackwell derived descent from the Royal Houses of Plantagenet, Bruce, and Stewart) of 3, Gillespie terrace, St Andrews. Blackwell was educated at Trinity College, Glenalmond, where, as captain of school, he early displayed leadership skills, combining these with sporting prowess, as captain of the 1st XI (Cricket), 1st XV (Rugby), and of the golf team.

== Law career ==
Destined for the legal profession, Blackwell was called to the Bar from the Inner Temple in 1892. Subsequently, he spent his career in Whitehall as a member of the British Civil Service, rising to senior appointments, first as Assistant Secretary at the Home Department from 1906 to 1913, and then as Legal Assistant Under-Secretary of State at the Home Office from 1913 until his retirement in 1933. He was awarded CB in the 1911 Coronation Honours.

As chief legal advisor to the Cabinet, Blackwell was involved in the prosecution of Roger Casement, and authorised the circulation of his disputed Black Diaries, advising the Cabinet in July 1916:

I see not the slightest objection to hanging Casement and afterwards giving as much publicity to the contents of his diary as decency permits so that at any rate the public in America and elsewhere may know what sort of man they are inclined to make a martyr of.

I understand that several members of the Government are inclined to the opinion that it may be inexpedient to execute Casement. I suppose it is feared that in addition to the American question the hanging of Casement may interfere with the Irish settlement. If Casement had been taken to Dublin a few days later he would of course have been courtmartialled and shot and would have been a 15th martyr. The shooting of the 14 leaders is said to have given a great impetus to the Sinn Fein movement. I am inclined to think that the rebellion itself and its results have given the impetus and that the situation today would have been much the same whether Pearse, Connolly and the rest had been shot or merely sent to Portland with a confident expectation of amnesty and early release.

Casement's value as a martyr is already a good deal discounted. His private character is by this time pretty generally known in London. The 'Daily Express' on three occasions has openly stated that he is a moral degenerate addicted to unmentionable offences and has cited his 'diaries’ in proof.

In 1918, due to worries over the large number of firearms left in private hands following World War I, and the concern that they would be used by "savage or semi-civilised tribesmen in outlying parts of the British Empire" or by an "anarchist or intellectual malcontent of the great cities whose weapons are the bomb and the automatic pistol", a Committee on Firearms Control was struck with Blackwell as its chairman. The report it issued recommended "stringent regulation" of rifles and small arms as "the number of persons who can urge any reasonable ground for possession of a revolver or pistol is extremely small [and] the danger attending the indiscriminate possession of such weapons is obvious", conclusions which led to the passage of the Firearms Act 1920.

== Later life ==
Following his retirement, Blackwell's continued interest in legal matters was shown by his 1934 appointment as chairman of the statutory committee of Britain's Pharmaceutical Society, to which he had been elected an honorary member in 1928. He exercised that position until 1939. Among other interests, he was a first-class golfer who captained The Royal and Ancient Golf Club of St Andrews in 1933. He served as the first president of The Civil Service Golfing Society from 1922 until his death. In 1924, the Club instituted The Sir Ernley Blackwell Trophy, which it still awards. He was also a member of the Zoological Society from 1914. His brother, Edward Blackwell, who was also a skilled golfer, placed second in the 1904 Amateur Championship.

== Family ==
Blackwell was married at the age of 69 to Kitty, Lady Blackwell, of 7, Hay Hill, London, W.1, who survived him. There were no children of this union.

== Death ==
Blackwell died at Radlett, Hertfordshire, England on 21 September 1941, aged 73. He was buried in the Blackwell family grave in St Andrews Eastern Cemetery, St Andrews, Fife, Scotland.
