= Murlough Bay =

Bay in Northern Ireland

Coordinates: 55.213°N 6.121°W

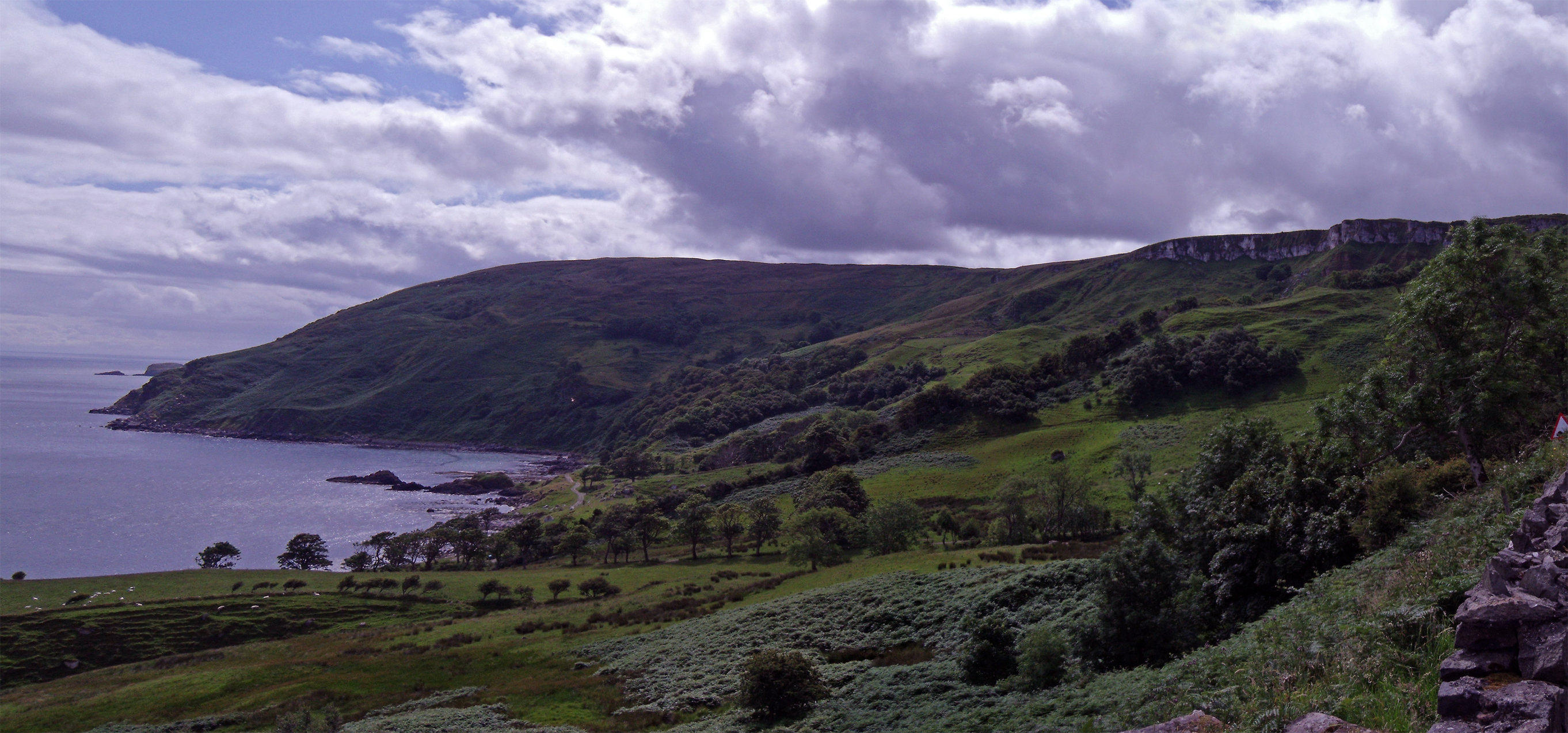
Murlough Bay, County Antrim

Murlough Bay (from Irish Murlach, meaning 'sea inlet') is a bay on the north coast of County Antrim, Northern Ireland between Fair Head and Torr Head. Known for its remote location, the area overlooks Rathlin Island and has views across the Irish Sea to the Mull of Kintyre, Islay, Jura and other Scottish islands. The local geology is typical of the Antrim topography with basalt overlaying sandstone and limestone. The area has many kilns used in the production of lime.

== History ==
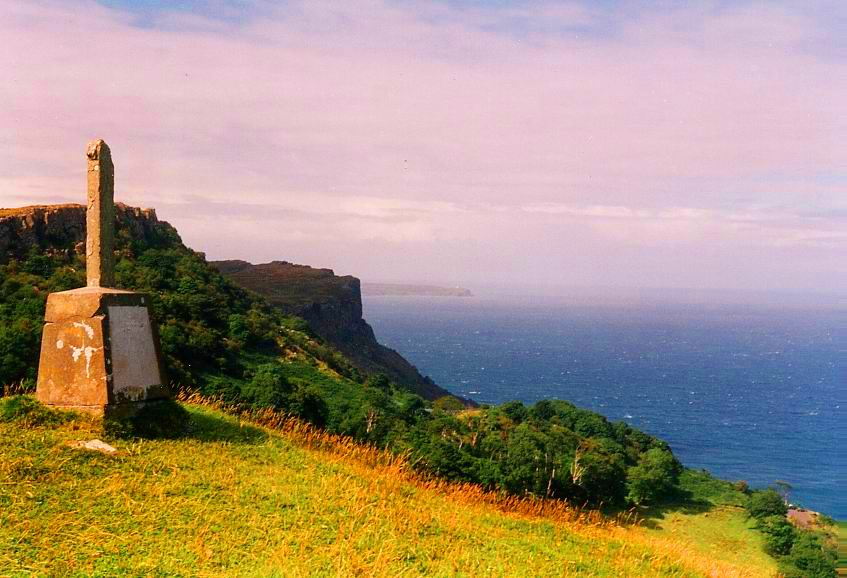
Cross erected to commemorate Sir Roger Casement

The original Gaelic name was Muir-bolc. According to the 11th century Preface to the Amra Coluim Cille, Murlough Bay was the place where Saint Columba landed after sailing from Iona to Ireland to attend the Synod of Drumceat c. 595 AD.

Although he is now buried in Dublin, Murlough Bay was the burial place of choice of Sir Roger Casement, a former British government diplomat. Knighted by King George V in 1911 and an Irish Nationalist revolutionary leader in 1916, he was executed by the government of the United Kingdom for treason in August 1916 during World War I. While awaiting execution in Pentonville prison, he sent a letter to his cousin Gertrude Bannister in which he wrote "Take my body back with you and let it lie in the old churchyard in Murlough Bay". Casement was a frequent visitor to Ballycastle, where he stayed with relatives and found a close affinity with the beauty and wildness of the location. A plinth at Murlough Bay is what remains of a more recent cross which was erected on the site to commemorate Casement. Each August, a small memorial is held here in his honour by Republican Sinn Féin.
