= Black Diaries =

Diaries purported to have been written by Roger Casement

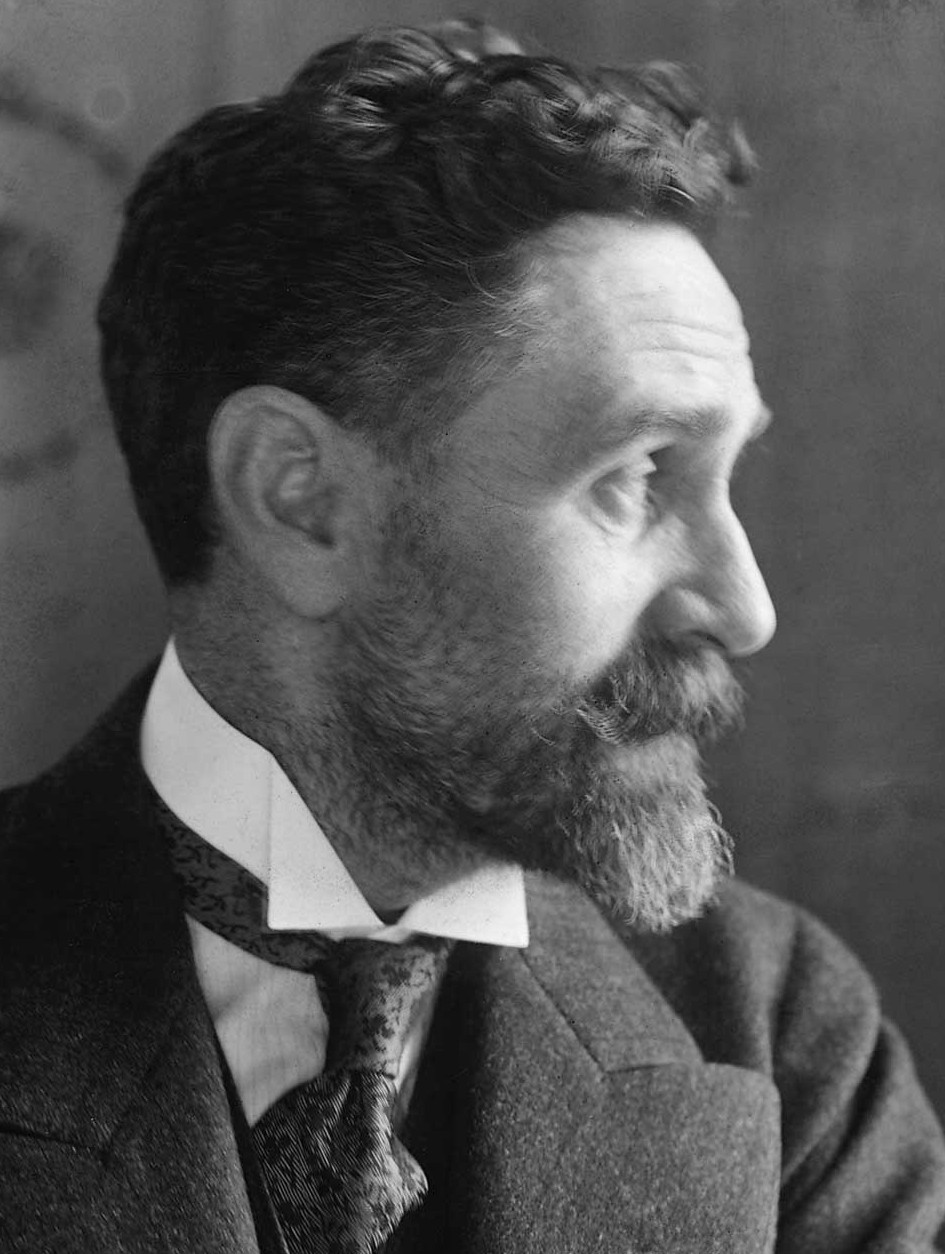
Roger Casement

The Black Diaries are diaries purported to have been written by the Irish revolutionary Roger Casement, which contained accounts of homosexual liaisons with young men, mostly prostitutes. They cover the years 1903, 1910 and 1911 (two).

Casement was charged with treason following the Easter Rising. During his trial the prosecution (F. E. Smith) suggested to the defence barrister (A. M. Sullivan) that they should jointly produce the diaries in evidence, as this would most likely cause the court to find Casement "guilty but insane", and save his life. Sullivan refused, and Casement was found guilty and condemned to death.

The British government then began to circulate copies of diary pages to block any appeals or requests for clemency, particularly from the US, that showed his "sexual degeneracy". The effect of their circulation was to dissuade some would-be supporters from joining an appeal for clemency, and Casement was hanged on 3 August 1916.

== Details ==
The term Black Diaries was coined by Peter Singleton-Gates and Maurice Girodias in their 1959 book of that name. A second set of journals kept by Casement in 1910 is known as the White Diaries or Amazon Journal.

The debate over the diaries' validity started in 1936 with William J. Maloney's book, The Forged Casement Diaries, in which he claimed to have proved that the British authorities had forged the diaries in order to discredit Casement. It was suggested that the forgeries were based on a diary written by a man whose abuses were being investigated by Casement in Peru in 1910. Casement is said to have transcribed the diary and submitted it to the Foreign Office as evidence, where it was later allegedly exploited by the secret services and presented as Casement's personal diary. However, Maloney never saw manuscript diaries or the alleged copies typed by the police. He relied on hearsay evidence given by a few of Casement's friends. Bulmer Hobson and Patrick Sarsfield O'Hegarty, two of Casement's close friends, claimed that Casement returned to London with the diary of Armando Normand, the Peruvian Amazon Company manager at Matanzas who was implicated with perpetrating vicious crimes against the Andoque and Bora populations. Hobson and O'Hegarty's accounts both noted that Casement translated this diary and sent a copy of it to the Foreign Office. This apparent diary of Normand's has not been made public.

The poet W. B. Yeats was moved by this book to write a poem, "Roger Casement", which he described as "a ferocious ballad". Another poet, Alfred Noyes, who had accepted the diaries as genuine in 1916, also criticised the establishment in a 1957 book, The Accusing Ghost or Justice for Casement.

In 1959 Peter Singleton-Gates and Maurice Girodias published The Black Diaries—a version of the diaries which they described as being based on "a bundle of documents" given to Singleton-Gates in 1922 by "a person of some authority"—in Paris, where they could not be prosecuted under the Official Secrets Act. That person was most likely Sir Basil Thomson who on his dismissal from Scotland Yard apparently removed large quantities of official papers. The diaries were released by the British government the same year, when they were made available in the Public Record Office in London.

In 1960 Roger McHugh doubted the diaries' veracity, commenting on: "suspicious internal discrepancies and contradictions which hint toward the hand of a forger and the diary's physical evolution from the descriptions of eyewitnesses in 1916 to the physical appearance of the diaries made available in 1959".

In 1965 The Trial of Sir Roger Casement, a book by H. Montgomery Hyde, was banned by the Irish Censorship of Publications Board because the purported diary extracts in it were found to be "indecent or obscene".

Casement's biography by Brian Inglis (1973–74) aired both arguments in a chapter in Part VII, "The Forgery Controversy". Inter alia, Inglis pondered why any putative forgers in the two-month window between Casement's arrest and trial had created 3 diaries and a cash register, ".. when a single diary would have sufficed". ".. a single mistake in any of them would have destroyed the whole ugly enterprise".

In 1993 a Home Office expert Dr. David Baxendale made a report featured in a BBC Radio 4 documentary. Dr. Baxendale stated that "the bulk of the handwriting in there is the work of Roger Casement". With reference to alleged interpolations he stated: "the handwriting of all the entries which were of that nature correspond closely with Mr Casement's handwriting." Baxendale’s opinion was broadcast to coincide with the open release of the diaries in the National Archives.

In 1994 Eoin O'Máille analysed the use of words in the two 1910 diaries, to establish if both were written by Casement, but the result was criticised for using "a computer programme which was designed to tell the 'reading age' of North American schoolchildren ... Linguistic analysis is something a little more subtle than that!"

In 2002 a forensic examination of the diaries was commissioned by Bill McCormack, Professor of Literary History at Goldsmiths College, University of London. The documents were examined by Audrey Giles, a leading forensic handwriting examiner, who concluded, according to a report in The Guardian, that "the handwriting, ink, paper, pen strokes and pencillings were all genuine." McCormack published a book on Maloney and the diaries in 2002. The Giles Report was published in 2005.

Also in 2002 Professor Daniel Vangroenweghe's examination of Casement's time in the Congo was published. He is a Belgian historian of the Congo Free State period, and argues closely that the use of Kikongo slang, and some entries about people and places in 1903, could not have been known in London in 1916. Finally he quotes from the unpublished autobiography of John Harris, who was shown the diary in 1916: "I was so firmly convinced, that the diary was not Roger Casement's handiwork. Alas, when it was put before me and I had examined certain parts, my confidence was shaken. Then I came upon two or three facts only known in Europe to Casement and myself, and then my hopes were scattered...".

Two US forensic-document examiners later peer-reviewed the 2005 Giles Report; both were critical of it. James Horan stated, "As editor of the Journal of Forensic Sciences and The Journal of the American Society of Questioned Document Examiners, I would not recommend publication of the Giles Report because the report does not show how its conclusion was reached. To the question, 'Is the writing Roger Casement's?' on the basis of the Giles Report as it stands, my answer would have to be I cannot tell." Marcel Matley, a second document examiner, stated, "Even if every document examined were the authentic writing of Casement, this report does nothing to establish the fact."

In 2016 16 Lives: Roger Casement by Angus Mitchell summarised his long held views that the diaries were forgeries. He also edited the Amazon Journal of Roger Casement and included a number of footnotes which express some of these views. One of these notes states "The latter [the black diary] portray Casement's state of mind as muddled, inaccurate and exaggerated. It should be remembered that as well as writing thousands of words of his journal each day, Casement also copied out in longhand the statements made by the Barbadians. In the seventy-five days covered by his Putumayo Journal, Casement wrote a total of around 250,000 words averaging well over three thousand words each day." Mitchell also refuted the allegations that Casement had a sexual relationship with Andrés O'Donnell. (Note: "Although Casement certainly found O'Donnell the least offensive of the Section Chiefs he had encountered thus far, it is wholly untenable that his feelings towards the men went beyond this.")

In 2016 the University of Notre Dame published Paul Hyde's monograph, which concludes that both sides of the dispute have outstanding issues to address: "the dominant and 'official' theory of the authenticity of the Black Diaries, in force for almost one hundred years, has almost no explanatory power whatsoever. It fails to answer the most basic and persistent questions ... Those who believe that the Black Diaries are forged do not have their belief supported by facts proven beyond reasonable doubt."

All the diaries, including for the first time the 1911 volume which contained the most prolonged sexual narrative, were published by Jeffrey Dudgeon the same year. A second, extended, paperback and electronic edition was published in 2016.

The Peruvian writer Mario Vargas Llosa, in the epilogue to his novel The Dream of the Celt which is based on Casement's life, expresses his opinion – "as a writer, and claiming no expertise" – that Casement did write the diaries, but that much of their content described his erotic fantasies rather than actual sexual experiences.

In 2019, Paul Hyde published Anatomy of a Lie; decoding Casement with a foreword by the Casement scholar Angus Mitchell. This presents new evidence and arguments against authenticity and includes the earlier Dis-covering Casement concerning the absence of witness testimony. Hyde continued publishing in Village and in 2024 an article appeared based on what Hyde identified as contradictory entries relating to the purchase of a motorbike in a ledger that formed part of the diaries. Dudgeon then published in Village stating that manuscript diaries were shown to two named witnesses. In March 2025, Hyde published another article fiercely critical of Dudgeon, citing Home Office documents verifying that both alleged 'witnesses' saw only police typescripts.
