= Jeff Dudgeon =

Northern Irish politician and activist

Jeffrey Dudgeon MBE

Member of Belfast City Council
- In office 22 May 2014 – 6 May 2019
- Preceded by: Bob Stoker
- Succeeded by: Sarah Bunting
- Constituency: Balmoral

Personal details
- Born: January 1946 (age 80) Belfast, Northern Ireland
- Party: UUP (since 2011); UKUP (1995–98); Labour Integrationist (1979); NILP (1970s)
- Education: Magee University College; Trinity College, Dublin
- Profession: Historian

Jeffrey Edward Anthony Dudgeon MBE (born January 1946) is a Northern Irish politician, historian and gay political activist. A member of the Ulster Unionist Party (UUP), Dudgeon was a Belfast City Councillor for the Balmoral DEA from 2014 to 2019.

== Career ==
At the 1979 general election he stood as a "Labour Integrationist" candidate for Belfast South.

He is best known for bringing the case Dudgeon v United Kingdom to the European Court of Human Rights; this successfully challenged Northern Ireland's laws criminalising consensual sexual acts between men in private.

Dudgeon was elected onto Belfast City Council at the 2014 local elections as the UUP representative for Balmoral. During the 2014 to 2019 council term, he was one of three openly gay politicians elected to the City Council, along with Mary Ellen Campbell of Sinn Féin and Julie-Anne Corr of the Progressive Unionist Party; at the 2019 local government election, all three lost their seats. He has also published a study of Roger Casement's Black Diaries, which accepted them as genuine.

He contested the 2011 Seanad election in the Republic of Ireland for the University of Dublin constituency. He was eliminated on the 9th count with 258 votes.

At the 2023 Northern Ireland local elections, Dudgeon stood as the UUP candidate in the Botanic DEA on Belfast City Council, but was unsuccessful.

== Personal life ==
He is originally from East Belfast, and attended Campbell College then Magee University College and Trinity College, Dublin. He has a long-term partner.

== Honours ==
As part of the 2012 New Year Honours, Dudgeon was appointed a Member of the Order of the British Empire (MBE) for "services to the Lesbian, Gay, Bisexual and Transgender community in Northern Ireland".
