= Rahoneen =

Townland (administrative area) in County Kerry, Ireland

Coordinates: 52.320°N 9.813°W

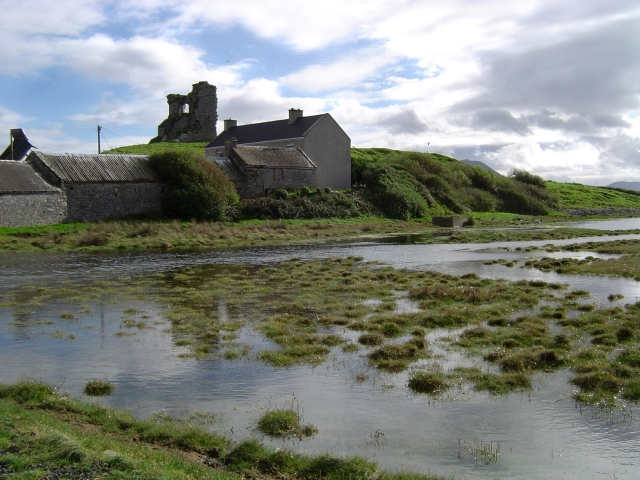
Ruined tower house and farm buildings at Rahoneen

Rahoneen (Irish: Ráth Eoghainín) is a small townland in the civil parish of Ardfert in County Kerry, Ireland. It is approximately 1.17 square kilometres (0.45 sq mi) in area and, as of the 2011 census, had a population of 29 people.

Evidence of ancient settlement in the area includes a ringfort at Rathcrihane (Ráth Creacháin; 'ringfort of Creachán'). This ringfort, also known as McKenna's Fort, became known as Casement's Fort after Roger Casement was captured in the area in 1916. Casement was discovered at McKenna's Fort on 21 April 1916. He had been put ashore from U19 at nearby Banna Strand as part of a plan to transport a consignment of German weapons ahead of the 1916 Easter Rising.

A ruined tower house, in Rahoneen townland, overlooks Carrahane Bay. The tower house, known as Rahoneen Castle, was historically associated with the Bishop of Ardfert. Writing in 1841, the topographer John O'Donovan (1806–1861) suggested that the castle was destroyed during the 17th-century Cromwellian invasion of Ireland.
