= The Dream of the Celt =

Novel by Mario Vargas Llosa

- Spanish edition
- Author: Mario Vargas Llosa
- Original title: El sueño del celta
- Translator: Edith Grossman
- Language: Spanish
- Genre: Historical novel
- Publisher: Alfaguara (Spanish); Faber and Faber (UK) and Farrar, Straus and Giroux (US)
- Publication date: 3 November 2010
- Publication place: Peru, Spain
- English publication date: 2012
- Media type: Print (hardcover and paperback)
- Pages: 464 pages
- ISBN: 978-1616052461 (Spanish)

The Dream of the Celt (Spanish: El sueño del celta) is a novel by Peruvian writer and 2010 Nobel laureate in literature Mario Vargas Llosa.

The novel was presented to the public November 3, 2010 during a special ceremony held in the Casa de América museum and cultural center in Madrid, that same day it appeared in bookstores. It has been a bestseller in Spain and was the most popular title at the XXIV Feria Internacional del Libro de Guadalajara. An English translation by Edith Grossman was published in 2012.

The book is a novelization of the life of Anglo-Irish diplomat and Irish patriot Roger Casement (1864–1916). The title is itself the title of a poem written by the subject. The Nobel Prize committee in announcing Vargas Llosa's selection in the following fashion: "[it is] for his cartography of structures of power and his trenchant images of the individual's resistance, revolt, and defeat," seemed to simultaneously anticipate and chart the author's course in his latest work, while clearly referencing some of his most acclaimed earlier novels.

Though remembered mainly in the Irish context, Roger Casement for a time played an important role in the history of Peru, Vargas Llosa's own country, helping to expose and put an end to terrible exploitation of Native Americans in Peru's Amazon region, known as the Putumayo genocide.

== Theme and structure ==
The Dream of the Celt combines elements of the historical novel with those of the journalistic chronicle; the main human and historical themes explored are those relating to the colonial subjugation and enslavement (via a process of systematic terror and torture) of the native inhabitants of the Congo Basin and the Peruvian Amazon during the latter part of the 19th and early part of the 20th century. The novel naturally and purposefully invites comparison with Joseph Conrad's Heart of Darkness (the direct appearance of Conrad in the novel leaves little doubt in this regard).

It is within this larger context that the complex and ultimately tragic story of British consul Roger Casement unfolds. The most notable events of this vita being his exposure to and his first-hand accounts of the systematic tortures inflicted on the native inhabitants of the Congo and Peru by European commercial concerns; his attainment of a British knighthood for these same humanitarian endeavors; his subsequent transformation into a radical fighter for Irish independence, collaboration with the German military, and participation in the Easter Rising; his arrest, prosecution, and conviction for treason by the British; the late revelations of a submerged history of pederastic activities as per his own secret diaries; his execution by hanging.

The story is told in alternating chapters, with the odd chapters detailing the last three months of Casement's life (in 1916), and the even chapters encompassing the protagonist's experiences up to that time; the latter are themselves divided into three parts, each one named after a specific colonial geography and reality to which Casement was exposed: "Congo," "Amazonia," "Ireland." Ultimately, odd and even chapters converge on a final structural and dramatic point, which is also the final point (and, in a sense, purpose) of Casement's life.

Excerpt from The Dream of the Celt:

Today I began the return to Boma. I had planned to remain on the Upper Congo for a couple of weeks longer. But, in truth, I have more than enough material to show what is taking place here. I am afraid that if I continue to examine the depths to which human infamy and shamefulness can descend I will simply not be able to write my Report. I am on the shores of madness. A normal human being cannot submerge himself for so many months in this hell without losing his mind, without succumbing to some mental derangement. Sleepless, some nights, I feel it happening to me. Something is breaking in my mind. I live in constant anguish. If I keep brushing elbows with what goes on here I too will find myself laying the lash, chopping off hands, and murdering Congo natives between lunch and dinner without feeling the slightest pangs of conscience or loss of appetite; for this is what happens to Europeans in this God-forsaken country. [pp. 108-109, Editorial Alfaguara, 2010]
