= Chapter =

Chapter or Chapters may refer to:

== Books ==
- Chapter (books), a main division of a piece of writing or document
- Chapter book, a story book intended for intermediate readers, generally age 7–10
- Chapters (bookstore), Canadian big box bookstore banner

== Buildings and divisions ==
- Chapter (religion), an assembly of members in a religious order
- Chapter house, a building attached to a cathedral or collegiate church
- Chapter house (Navajo Nation), an administrative division on the Navajo Nation
- Chapter (Navajo Nation), the most local form of government on the Navajo Nation
- Chapter Arts Centre, a cultural centre in Cardiff, Wales
- Every fraternity and sorority has a membership, the meeting of which is known as a chapter

== Music ==
- Chapter Music, a record label
- "Chapter", 2004 song by Psapp from the album Tiger, My Friend
- Chapters, a 1991 album by Cheryl Pepsii Riley
- Chapters (Amorphis album), a 2003 album by Amorphis
- Chapters (Anekdoten album), a 2009 album by Anekdoten
- Chapters (Forever Changed album), a 2006 album by Forever Changed
- Chapters (Paradox album), a 2015 album by Paradox
- Chapters (Yuna album), a 2016 album by Yuna

== Organization ==
- A local division of within organizations, such as non-profits, trade unions, or fraternities and sororities

== Other ==
- Chapters (film), a 2012 Malayalam drama film

== See also ==
- The Chapters, a band from Dublin
- Capitulum (disambiguation)
