= Roger Casement =

Irish diplomat, activist, nationalist and poet (1864–1916)

- Ruairí Mac Easmainn
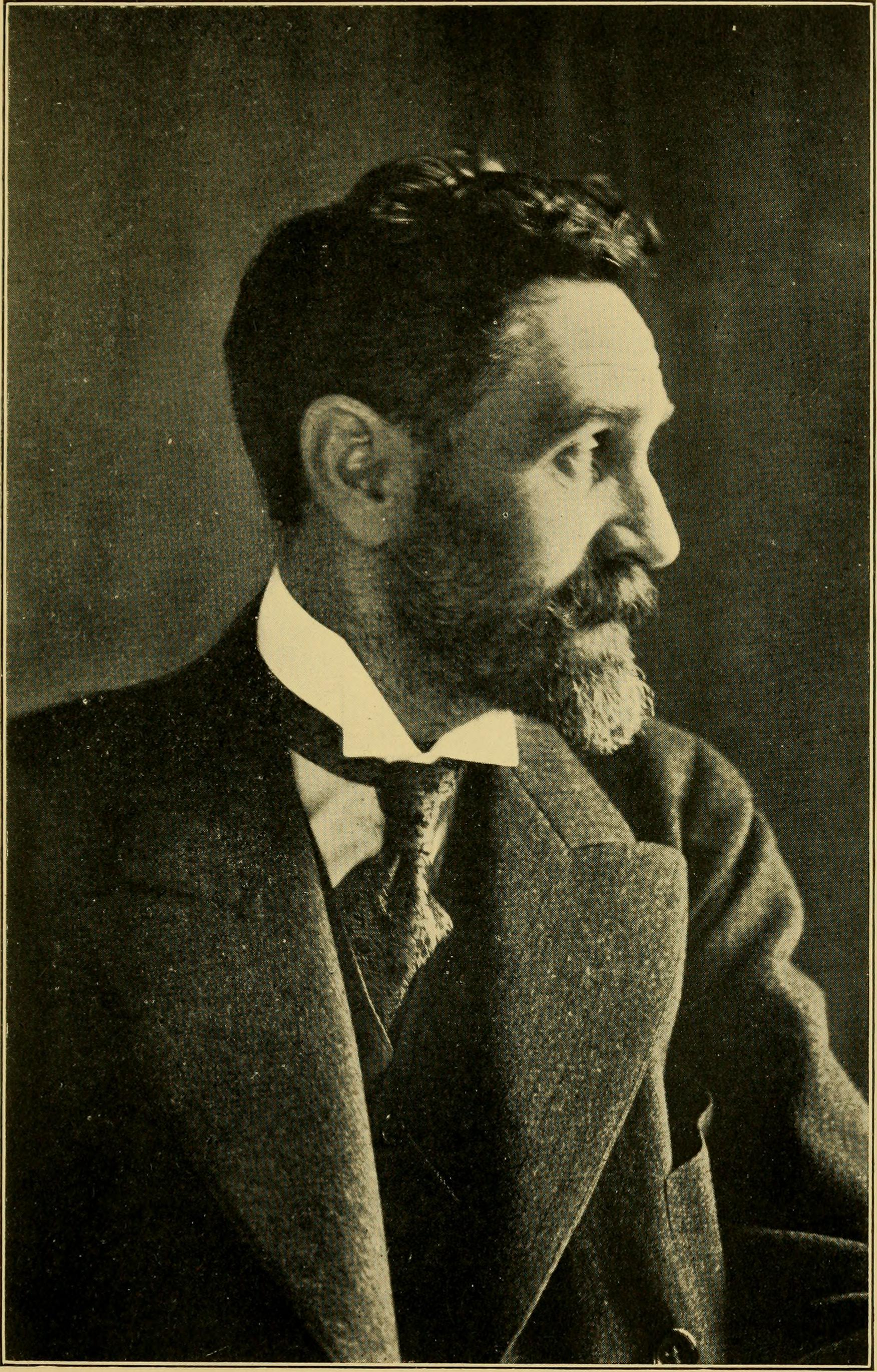
- Born: 1 September 1864; Sandycove, County Dublin, Ireland
- Died: 3 August 1916 (aged 51); Pentonville Prison, London, England
- Cause of death: Execution by hanging
- Monuments: Casement Monument at Ballyheigue Beach; Roger Casement Statue at Dún Laoghaire Baths
- Citizenship: Irish
- Occupations: Diplomat, poet, humanitarian activist
- Organisation: British Foreign Office
- Title: a knighthood for his efforts on behalf of the Amazonian Indians, having been appointed Companion of the Order of St Michael and St George (CMG) in 1905 for his Congo work.
- Movement: Irish nationalism; Anti-imperialism
- Parents: Roger Casement (father); Anne Jephson (mother)
- Military service
- Burial place: Glasnevin Cemetery, Dublin
- Allegiance: Irish Republic
- Branch: Irish Volunteers
- Service years: 1913-1916
- Memorials: Tralee Casement railway station; Casement Aerodrome

Roger David Casement (Irish: Ruairí Dáithí Mac Easmainn; 1 September 1864 – 3 August 1916), known as Sir Roger Casement, CMG, between 1911 and 1916, was a diplomat and Irish nationalist executed by the United Kingdom for treason during World War I.

He worked for the British Foreign Office as a diplomat, becoming known as a humanitarian activist, and later as a poet and Easter Rising leader. Described as the "father of twentieth-century human rights investigations", he was honoured in 1905 for the Casement Report on the Congo Free State and knighted in 1911 for his important investigations of human rights abuses in the rubber industry in Peru.

In Africa as a young man, Casement first worked for commercial interests before joining the British Colonial Service. In 1891 he was appointed as a British consul, a profession he followed for more than 20 years. Influenced by the Second Boer War and his investigation into colonial atrocities against indigenous peoples, Casement grew to mistrust imperialism. After retiring from consular service in 1913, he became more involved with Irish republicanism and other separatist movements.

During World War I, he made efforts to gain German military aid for the 1916 Easter Rising that sought to gain Irish independence. He was arrested, convicted and executed for high treason. He was stripped of his knighthood and other honours. Before, during and after the trial, British security agents and police showed typescripts prepared by the Metropolitan police to influential persons. These were said to be official copies of his private journals which detailed homosexual activities. Given prevailing views and existing laws on homosexuality, this material undermined support for clemency. Disputes have continued about these diaries; a private handwriting comparison study in 2002 concluded that Casement had written the diaries, but this was contested by several scholars.

== Early life ==
=== Family and education ===
Casement was born in Dublin and lived in very early childhood at Doyle's Cottage, Lawson Terrace, Sandycove, a terrace that no longer exists, but that was on Sandycove Road between what is now Fitzgerald's pub and The Butler's Pantry delicatessen.

His father, Captain Roger Casement of the (King's Own) Regiment of Dragoons, was the son of Hugh Casement, a Belfast shipping merchant who went bankrupt and later moved to Australia. Captain Casement had served in the 1842 Afghan campaign. He travelled to Europe to fight as a volunteer in the Hungarian Revolution of 1848 but arrived after the Surrender at Világos. After the family moved to England, Roger's mother, Anne Jephson (or Jepson), had him secretly baptised at the age of three as a Catholic in Rhyl, Wales. However, the priest who arranged his baptism in 1916 clearly stated that the baptism had been in Aberystwyth, 80 miles (130 km) from Rhyl. Confusion over the location of his baptism can be explained by Casement mistaking the placename after 48 years. Casement was later raised as a Protestant and remained such throughout his adult life.

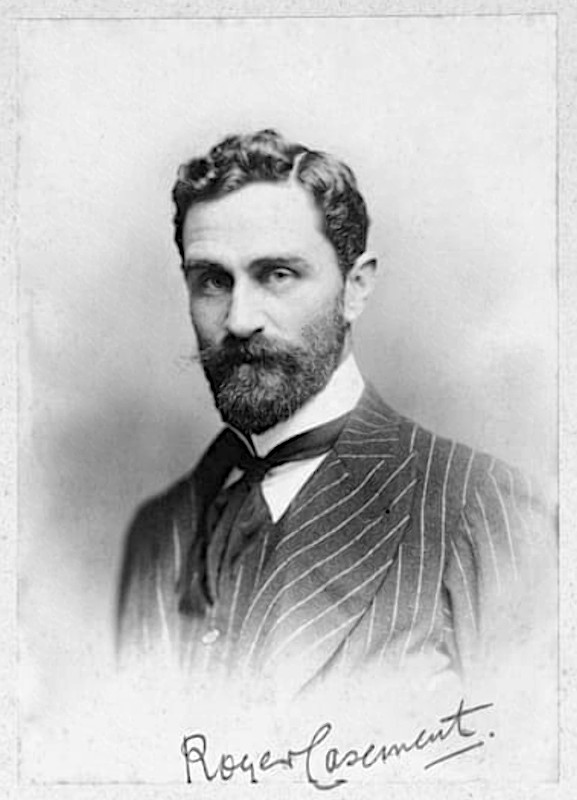
c. 1910

According to an 1892 letter, Casement believed his mother was descended from the Jephson family of Mallow, County Cork, but the Jephson family's historian provides no evidence of this. The family lived in England in genteel poverty; Roger's mother died when he was nine. His father took the family back to Ireland to County Antrim to live near paternal relatives. When Casement was 13 years old, his father died in Ballymena, and he was left dependent on the charity of relatives, the Youngs and the Casements. He was educated at the Diocesan School, Ballymena (later the Ballymena Academy). He left school at 16 and went to England to work as a clerk with Elder Dempster, a Liverpool shipping company headed by Alfred Lewis Jones.

Roger Casement's brother, Thomas Hugh Jephson Casement (1863–1939), had a roving life at sea and as a soldier, and later helped establish the Irish Coastguard Service. He was the inspiration for a character in Denis Johnston's play The Moon in the Yellow River. He drowned in Dublin's Grand Canal on 6 March 1939, having threatened suicide.

=== Observations of Casement ===
In a 1938 comment on Casement, which may have been coloured by knowledge of his subsequent fate, diplomat Ernest Hambloch, who knew Casement for three weeks in 1910, describes an "unexpected" figure: tall, ungainly; "elaborately courteous" but with "a good deal of pose about him, as though he was afraid of being caught off his guard". "An easy talker and a fluent writer", he could "expound a case, but not argue it". “His greatest charm was his voice, which was very musical". The eyes were "kindly", but not given to laughter: "a sense of humour might have saved him from many things".

Joseph Conrad's first impressions of Casement, from an encounter in the Congo in 1890 he judged "a positive piece of good luck", were that he "thinks, speaks well, [and is] most intelligent and very sympathetic". Later, after Casement's arrest and trial, Conrad—by then a naturalized British subject—revoked and contradicted his original judgment of a quarter century earlier: "Already in Africa, I judged he was a man, properly speaking, of no mind at all. I don't mean stupid. I mean that he was all emotion. By emotional force (Putumayo, Congo report, etc.) he made his way, and sheer temperament—a truly tragic personality: all but the greatness of which he had not a trace. Only vanity. But in the Congo it was not yet visible."

== British diplomat and human rights investigator ==
=== The Congo and the Casement Report ===
Casement worked in the Congo for Henry Morton Stanley and the African International Association from 1884; this association became known as a front for King Leopold II of Belgium in his takeover of what became the so-called Congo Free State. Casement worked on a survey to improve communication and recruited and supervised workmen in building a railroad to bypass the lower 220 miles (350 km) of the Congo River, which is made unnavigable by cataracts, in order to improve transportation and trade to the Upper Congo. During his commercial work, he learned African languages.

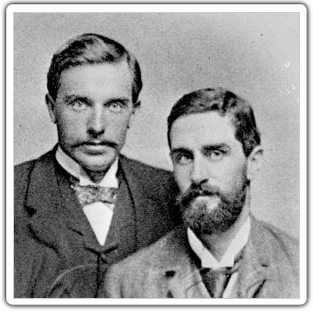
Roger Casement (right) and his friend Herbert Ward, whom he met in the Congo Free State

In 1890 Casement met Joseph Conrad, who had come to the Congo to pilot a merchant ship, Le Roi des Belges ('King of the Belgians'). Both were inspired by the idea that "European colonisation would bring moral and social progress to the continent and free its inhabitants 'from slavery, paganism and other barbarities.' Each would soon learn the gravity of his error." Conrad published his short novel Heart of Darkness in 1899, exploring the colonial ills. Casement later exposed the conditions he found in the Congo during an official investigation for the British government. In these formative years, he also met Herbert Ward, and they became longtime friends. Ward left Africa in 1889, and devoted himself to a career in art and sculpture, producing works that centered on Congolese subjects and culture.

Casement joined the Colonial Service, under the authority of the Colonial Office, first serving overseas as a clerk in British West Africa. In August 1901 he transferred to the Foreign Office service as British consul in the eastern part of the French Congo. In 1903 the Balfour Government commissioned Casement, then its consul at Boma in the Congo Free State, to investigate the human rights situation in that colony of the Belgian king, Leopold II. Setting up a private army known as the Force Publique, Leopold had squeezed revenue out of the people of the territory through a reign of terror in the harvesting and export of rubber and other resources. In trade, Belgium shipped guns and other materials to the Congo, used chiefly to suppress the local people.

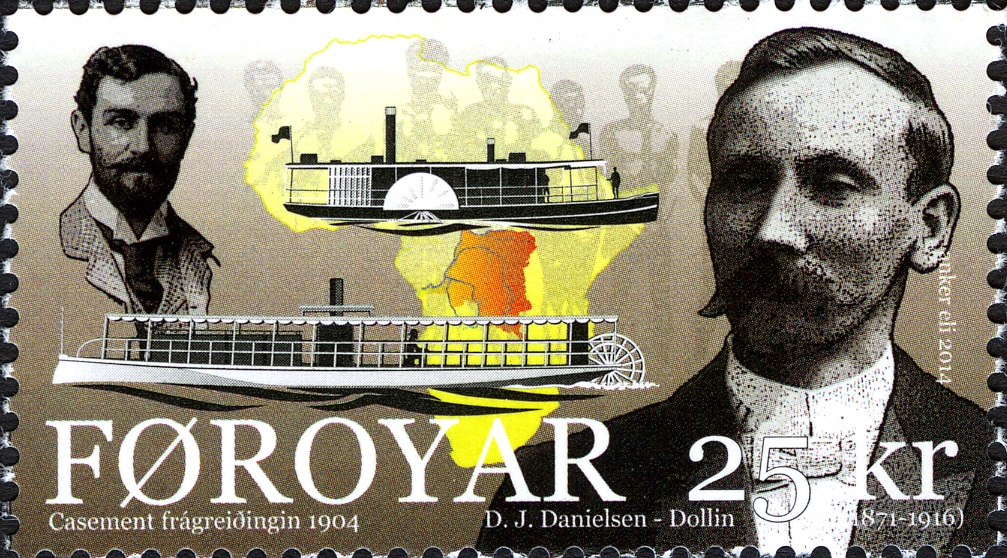
2014 Faroe Islands stamp depicting Casement and Daniel Jacob Danielsen, his Faroese boat captain and assistant

Casement travelled for weeks in the upper Congo Basin to interview people throughout the region, including workers, overseers and mercenaries. He delivered a long, detailed eyewitness report to the Crown that exposed abuses: "the enslavement, mutilation, and torture of natives on the rubber plantations". It became known as the Casement Report of 1904. King Leopold had held the Congo Free State since 1885, when the Berlin Conference of European powers and the United States effectively gave him free rein in the area.

Leopold had exploited the territory's natural resources (mostly rubber) as a private entrepreneur, not as king of the Belgians. Using violence and murder against men and their families, Leopold's private Force Publique had decimated many native villages in the course of forcing the men to gather rubber and abusing them to increase productivity. Casement's report provoked controversy, and some companies with a business interest in the Congo rejected its findings, as did Casement's former boss, Alfred Lewis Jones.

When the report was made public, opponents of Congolese conditions formed interest groups, such as the Congo Reform Association, founded by E. D. Morel with Casement's support, and demanded action to relieve the situation of the Congolese. Other European nations followed suit, as did the United States. The British Parliament demanded a meeting of the 14 signatory powers to review the 1885 Berlin Agreement defining interests in Africa. The Belgian Parliament, pushed by Socialist leader Emile Vandervelde and other critics of the king's Congolese policy, forced Léopold to set up an independent commission of inquiry. In 1905, despite Leopold's efforts, it confirmed the essentials of Casement's report. On 15 November 1908, the parliament of Belgium took over the Congo Free State from Leopold and organised its administration as the Belgian Congo.

=== Portugal ===
In July 1904 Casement was appointed as Consul in Lisbon. This was seen in London as a comfortable and better paid promotion after his arduous service in Africa. Casement had responded that while he would take up the assignment, "it might relieve the Foreign Office of some embarrassment were I to resign from the Service."

In the event Casement found the undemanding and routine nature of consular work in a European capital to lack the challenge and satisfaction of his earlier postings. Poor health gave grounds for his returning to Britain after only a few months.

=== Peru: Abuses against the Putumayo Indians ===
In 1906 the Foreign Office sent Casement to Brazil: first as consul in Santos, then transferred to Pará, and lastly promoted to consul-general in Rio de Janeiro. He was attached as a consular representative to a commission investigating reports about an enslaved workforce collecting rubber for the Peruvian Amazon Company (PAC), which had been registered in Britain in 1907 and had a British board of directors and numerous stockholders. In September 1909, a journalist named Sidney Paternoster wrote in Truth, a British magazine, of abuses against PAC workers as well as Peruvians competing against Colombians in the disputed region of the Peruvian Amazon. The article was titled "The Devil's Paradise: A British-Owned Congo".

In addition, the British consul at Iquitos had said that Barbadians, considered British subjects as part of the empire, had been ill-treated while working for PAC, which gave the government a reason to intervene (ordinarily it could not investigate the internal affairs of another country). These Barbadians were exploited into indebtedness to the Company, and used as enforcers against the Company's enslaved indigenous workforce. (Note: Some of the ways the company exploited these Barbadians, include wage theft, charging extortionate prices for the goods necessary to survive, violating agreed terms of a signed contract, encouraging unrestricted gambling, and more.) American civil engineer Walter Hardenburg had told Paternoster of witnessing a joint PAC and Peruvian military action against a Colombian rubber station, which they destroyed, stealing the rubber. He also saw Peruvian Indians whose backs were marked by severe whipping, in a pattern called the "Mark of Arana" (the head of the rubber company), and reported other abuses.

PAC, with its operational headquarters in Iquitos, dominated the city and the region. The area was separated from the main population of Peru by the Andes, and it was 1,900 miles (3,100 km) from the Amazon's mouth at Pará. The British-registered company was effectively controlled by the archetypal rubber baron Julio César Arana and his brother. Born in Rioja, Arana had climbed out of poverty to own and operate a company harvesting great quantities of rubber in the Peruvian Amazon, which was much in demand on the world market. The rubber boom had led to expansion in Iquitos as a trading centre, as all the company rubber was shipped down the Amazon River from there to the Atlantic port. Numerous foreigners had flocked to the area seeking their fortunes in the rubber boom, or at least some piece of the business. The rough frontier city, including both respectable businesses and the vice district, was highly influenced by the PAC and Arana.

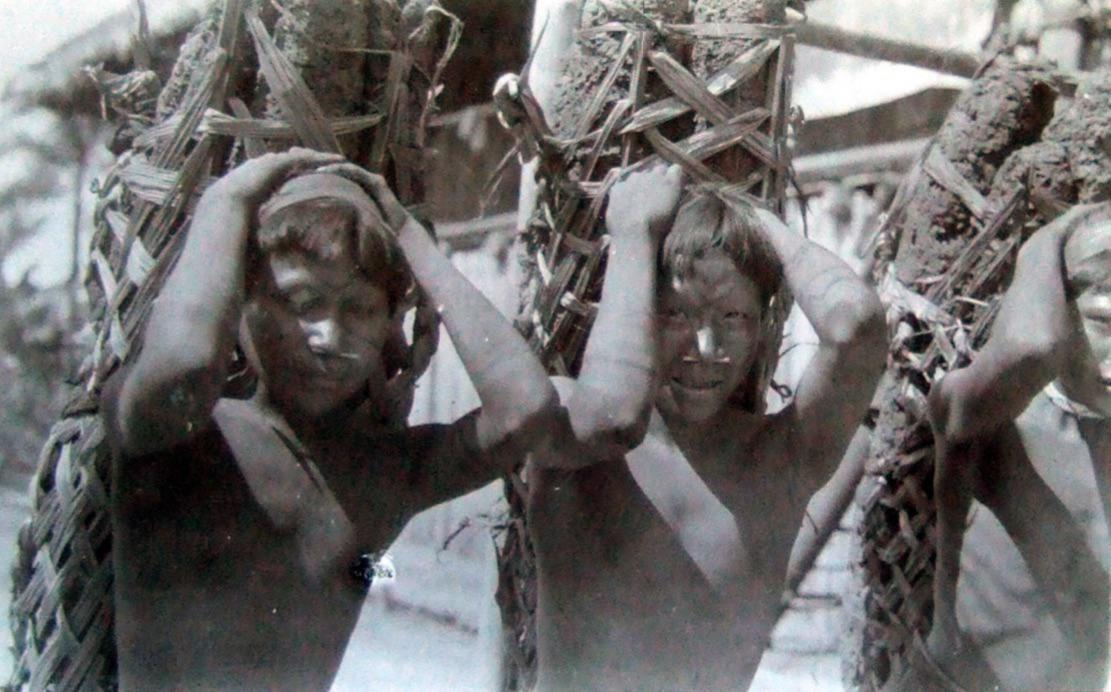
Enslaved natives with a load of rubber weighing 75 kilos, having journeyed 100 kilometers with no food given

Casement travelled to the Putumayo District, where the rubber was harvested deep in the Amazon Basin, and explored the treatment of the local Indians of Peru. The isolated area was outside the reach of the national government and near the border with Colombia, which periodically made incursions in competition for the rubber. For years, the Indians had been forced into unpaid labour by field staff of the PAC, who exerted absolute power over them and subjected them to near starvation, (Note: In his Putumayo report, Casement wrote that "[d]eliberate starvation was again and again resorted to, but this not where it was desired merely to frighten, but where the intention was to kill.) severe physical abuse, rape of women and girls by the managers and overseers, terrorization and casual murder. Casement found conditions as inhumane as those in the Congo. On 23 October 1910, regarding those conditions, he wrote that "It far exceeds in depravity and demoralisation the Congo regime at its worst". With "the only redeeming feature" he could identify with being that the Putumayo genocide affected thousands, whereas Leopold's state affected millions.

Casement made two lengthy visits to the region, first in 1910 with a commission of commercial investigators. During his first journey in the Putumayo, he met several people connected to the company's most infamous actions, including Armando Normand and Victor Macedo. Casement wrote in his journal that Normand and Macedo actively tried to discredit his investigation and bribe the Barbadian employees. Casement believed that Macedo and Normand would do anything to save themselves and thought that they might have the Barbadians arrested in Iquitos for libel. (Note: Macedo threatened the Barbadian employees during Casement's investigation in 1910. Casement's journal states "He has threatened the Barbados men here with being shot—with 'having them shot' if they told anything on him—and he has been the principal directing Agent in a series of appalling crimes committed on the native population whereby the Company's 'workers' have been reduced in numbers and in physical capacity for work.") Casement even speculated that if he went to Matanzas alone, which was Normand's station, he might have "died of fever" and no one would have known. This alludes to previous suggestions that if Casement had not come to the Putumayo on an official mission, he might have been murdered. On his return to Iquitos, a French trader Casement had previously met, told Casement that if he hadn't come in an official manner, the Company "would have got away with" him up there and his death would be blamed on the Natives. Casement interviewed both (some of) the Putumayo natives and men who had abused them, including thirty Barbadians, three of whom had also suffered from inhumane conditions imposed by the company. When the report was publicised, there was public outrage in Britain over the abuses.

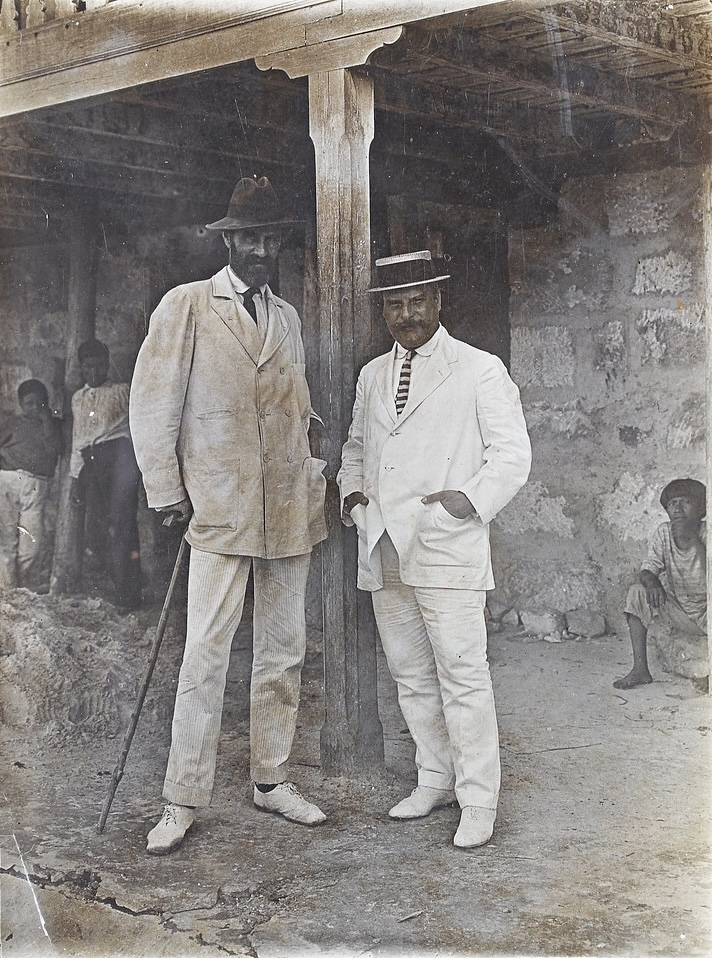
Roger Casement and Juan A. Tizón at La Chorrera in 1910

Casement's report has been described as a "brilliant piece of journalism", as he wove together first-person accounts by both "victims and perpetrators of atrocities ... Never before had distant colonial subjects been given such personal voices in an official document." After his report was made to the British government, some wealthy board members of the PAC were horrified by what they learned. Arana and the Peruvian government promised to make changes. In 1911, the British government asked Casement to return to Iquitos and Putumayo to see if promised changes in treatment had occurred. In a report to the British foreign secretary, dated 17 March 1911, Casement detailed the rubber company's continued use of pillories to punish the Indians:

Men, women, and children were confined in them for days, weeks, and often months. ... Whole families ... were imprisoned—fathers, mothers, and children, and many cases were reported of parents dying thus, either from starvation or from wounds caused by flogging, while their offspring were attached alongside them to watch in misery themselves the dying agonies of their parents.

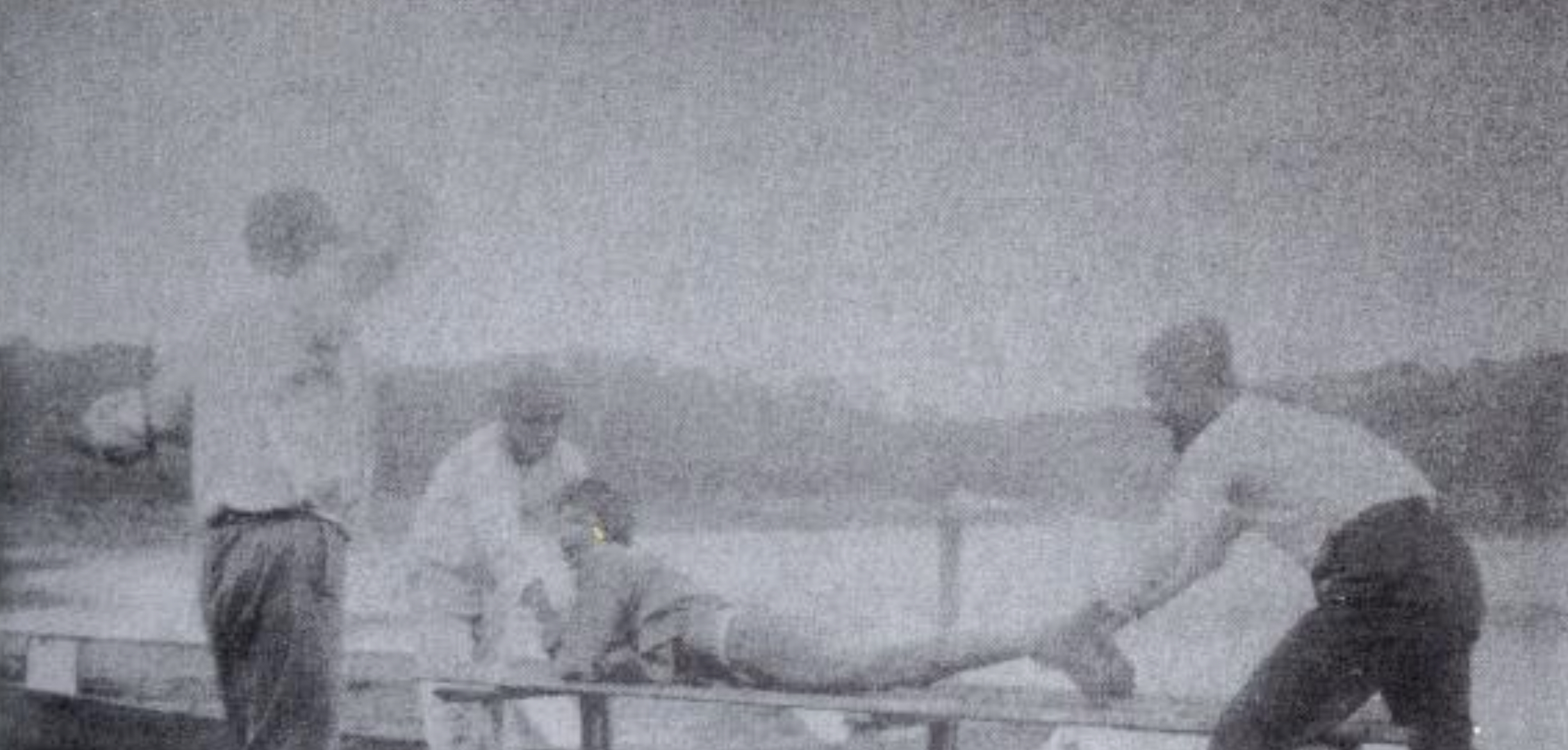
Flogging of a Putumayo native, carried out by the employees of Julio César Arana

Some of the company men exposed as killers in his 1910 report were charged by Peru, while most fled the region and were never captured. In 1911, Casement tried to have one man in particular arrested, Andrés O'Donnell, after he was discovered living comfortably in Barbados. O'Donnell had worked for Arana as the manager of Entre Rios for seven years, and hundreds of natives died under his administration. Casement noted that he was the "least criminal of the chief agents" and "I don't think he killed Indians for pleasure or sport—but only to terrorize for rubber". An extradition order was issued by Peru however it was found to be faulty, so O'Donnell was released on a legal technicality. He later escaped to Panama, and then the United States. Others, such as Armando Normand and Augusto Jiménez Seminario, were arrested but escaped from jail before the conclusion of trials in court.

Between September and November 1911, Casement attempted to secure the arrest of Alfredo Montt and José Inocente Fonseca, which Casement referred to as two of the "worst Criminals on the Putumayo". At the time, the pair were working for a Brazilian firm named Edwards & Serra at the settlement of Santa Theresa, around 40 miles from Benjamin Constant on the Javary River's confluence with the Solimões River. They also had around ten Boras people with them, trafficked from the rubber station of La Sabana, part of La Chorrera's agency. (Note: "and it is on the forced labour of these people that they [,Montt and Fonseca,] now rely for their subsistence.") Casement managed to get Brazilian authorities to issue an arrest warrant and order of expulsion from Brazilian territory; however, Casement wrote this was "not put into execution by the police officer dispatched for that purpose from Manaos". The instructions delivered to local authorities detailed that they would accompany Casement, detain Montt and Fonseca, then travel to the Peruvian port of Nazareth, located on Peru's border with Brazil, where Peruvian authorities could arrest the pair. Casement observed that on the day of his arrival at Benjamin Constant, the officer sent from Manaos, José P. de Campos, gathered with the commander of the local police and Señor Serra of the Edwards & Serra firm. Casement became convinced that Serra bribed these two figures of authority, as Campos left four days after his arrival at Benjamin Constant instead of beginning his pursuit immediately while Montt and Fonseca were warned that authorities were actively seeking them. Montt and Fonseca managed to evade further attempts to secure their arrest by Peruvian and Brazilian authorities.

After his return to Britain, Casement repeated his extra-consular campaigning work by organising interventions by the Anti-Slavery and Aborigines' Protection Society and Catholic missions in the region. Some entrepreneurs had smuggled out cuttings from rubber plants and began cultivation in southeast Asia in colonies of the British Empire. The scandal of the PAC caused major losses in business to the company, and rubber demand began to be met by farmed rubber in other parts of the world. With the collapse of business for PAC, most foreigners left Iquitos and it quickly returned to its former status as an isolated backwater. For a period, the rubber patrons that depended on the Putumayo Indians for their workforce, were largely left alone. Arana was never prosecuted as head of the company. He lived in London for years, then returned to Peru. Despite the scandal associated with Casement's report and international pressure on the Peruvian government to change conditions, Arana later had a successful political career. He was elected a senator and died in Lima, Peru in 1952, aged 88.

Casement wrote extensively both for his private record and for the Foreign Office and the anti-slavery cause. In 1910 he wrote a long and detailed personal account of his day-to-day experience in the Putumayo investigation. This is known today as "The Amazon Journal" as edited and published by Angus Mitchell. The original manuscript is kept in the National Library of Ireland; it contains no sexual references whatsoever. The Black Diaries have seven conflicting versions of their provenance furnished by British officials. In 1911 Casement received a knighthood for his efforts on behalf of the Amazonian Indians (Note: Casement's sentiments on this subject may be examined through the following quote, written as a reply to Gerald Spicer: "if you ever attempt to 'Sir Roger' me again I'll enter into an alliance with the Aranas and Pablo Zumaeta to cut you off someday in the woods of St. James' Park, and convert you into a rubber worker to our joint profit.") having been appointed Companion of the Order of St Michael and St George (CMG) in 1905 for his Congo work.

== Irish revolutionary ==
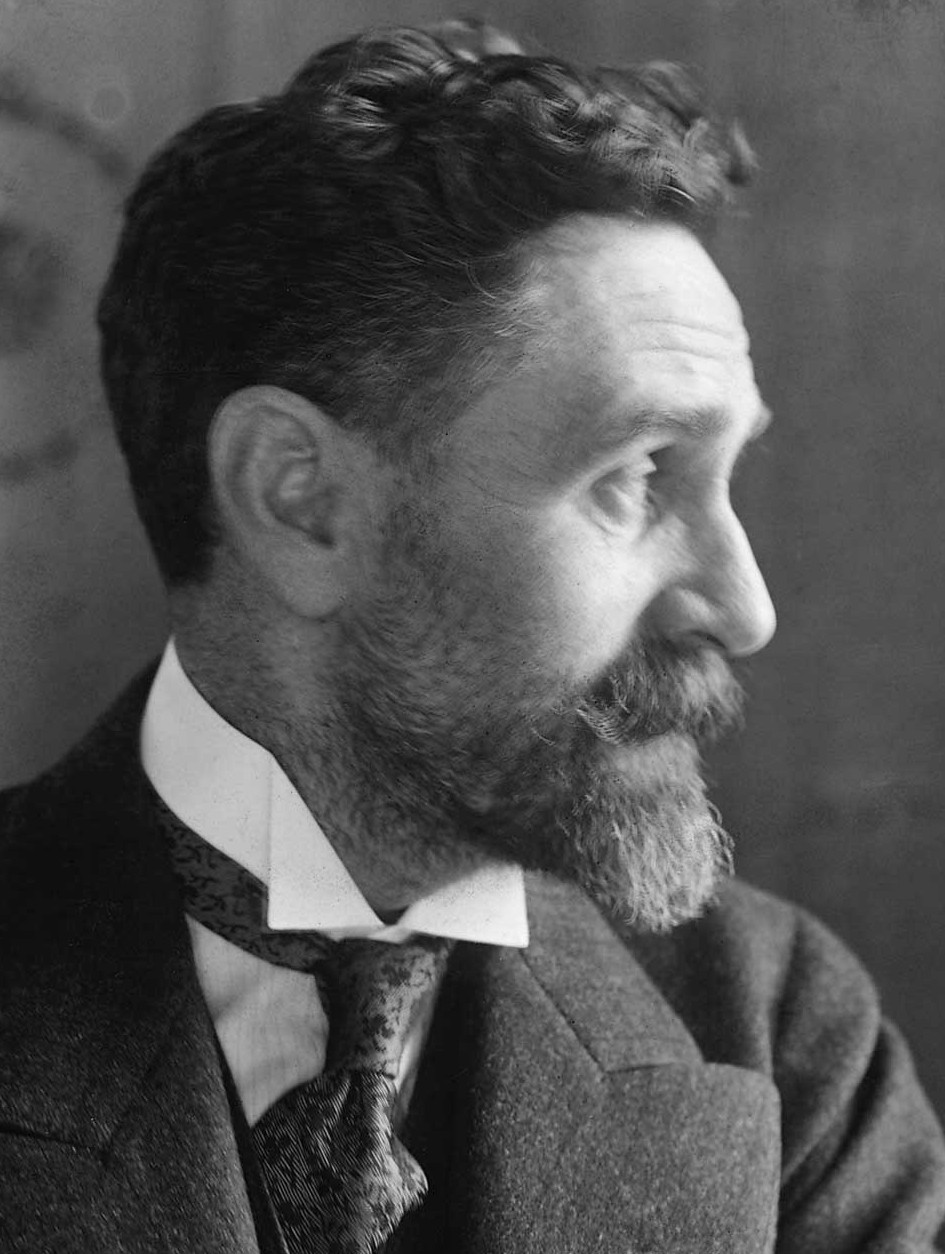
Casement attempted to smuggle weapons from Germany for the Easter Rising.

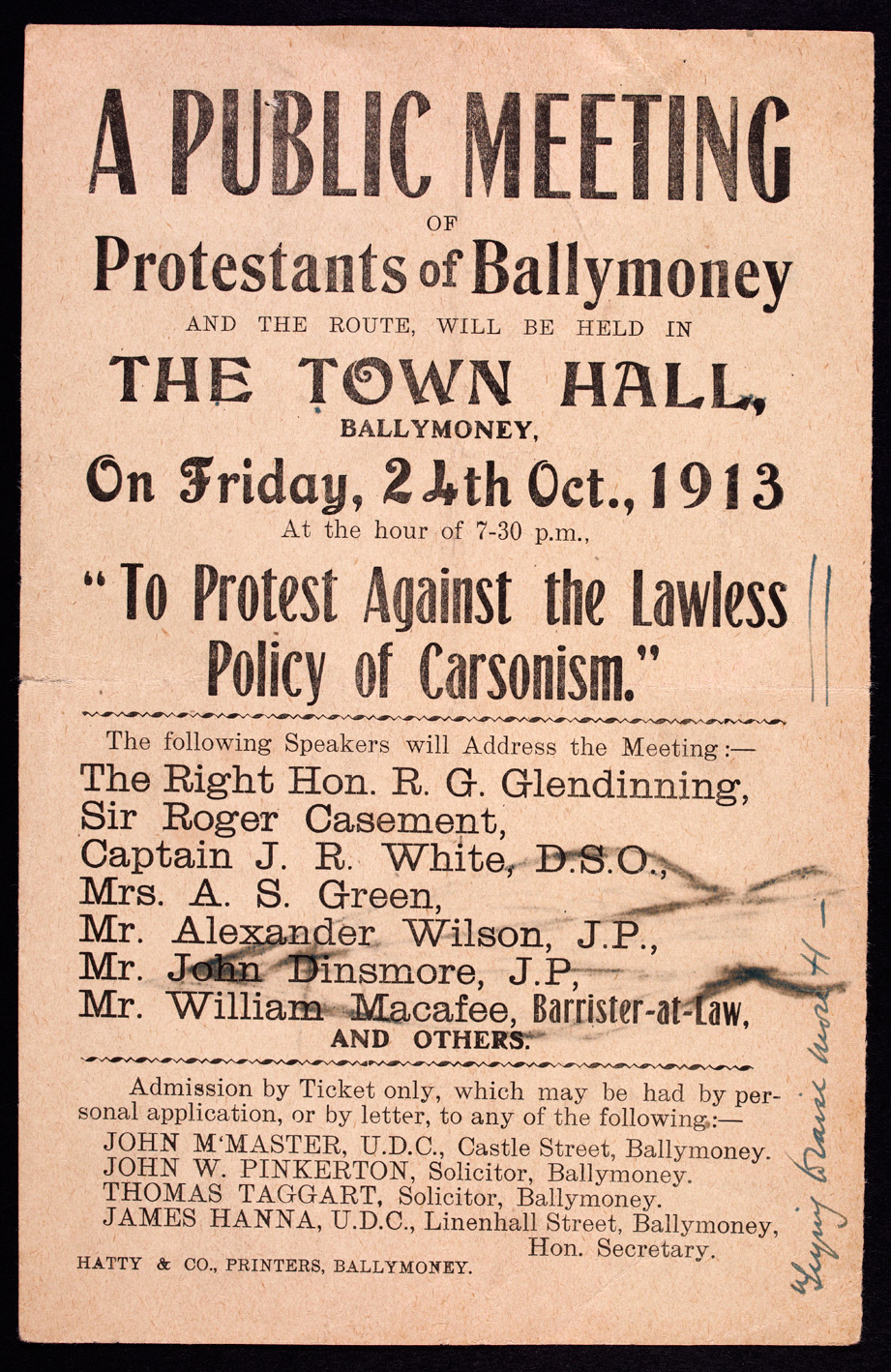
Poster advertising public meeting "Against the Lawless Policy of Carsonism"

=== Return to Ireland ===
In Ireland in 1904, on leave from Africa from that year until 1905, Casement joined the Gaelic League, an organisation established in 1893 to preserve and revive the spoken and literary use of the Irish language. He met the leaders of the powerful Irish Parliamentary Party (IPP) to lobby for his work in the Congo. He did not support those, like the IPP, who proposed Home Rule, as he believed that the House of Lords would veto such efforts. Casement was more impressed by Arthur Griffith's new Sinn Féin party (founded 1905), which called for an independent Ireland (through a non-violent series of strikes and boycotts). Its sole imperial tie would be a dual monarchy between Britain and Ireland, modelled on the policy example of Ferenc Deák in Hungary. Casement joined the party in 1905.

In a letter to Mrs. J. R. Green, (the Irish historian Alice Stopford Green) dated 20 April 1906 Casement reflected on his conversion to the national cause as someone who had "accepted imperialism" and had been close to an "ideal" Englishman:

It is a mistake for an Irishman to mix himself up with the English. He is bound to do one of two things—either to go to the wall if he remains Irish or to become an Englishman himself. You see I very nearly did become one once. At the Boer War time, I had been away from Ireland for years, out of touch with everything native to my heart and mind, trying hard to do my duty, and every fresh act of duty made me appreciably nearer the ideal of the Englishman. I had accepted Imperialism. British rule was to be accepted at all costs, because it was the best for everyone under the sun, and those who opposed that extension ought rightly to be 'smashed.' I was on the high road to being a regular Imperialist jingo—although at heart underneath all, and unsuspected almost by myself, I had remained an Irishman. Well, the war, [i.e., the Boer War] gave me qualms at the end—the concentration camps bigger ones—and finally, when up in those lonely Congo forests where I found Leopold I found also myself, the incorrigible Irishman.

=== Ulster ===
In the north, through his sister, Nina, in Portrush, and his close friends in London, Robert Lynd and Sylvia Dryhurst, Casement was drawn into the orbit of Francis Joseph Bigger. A wealthy Presbyterian solicitor, at his house on the northern shore of Belfast Lough, Ard Righ, Bigger hosted not only the poets and writers of the "Northern Revival", but also, and critically for Casement, Ulster Protestants committed to taking the case for an Irish Ireland to their co-religionists. These included Ada McNeil, with whom Casement helped organise the first Feis na nGleann ('Festival of the Glens') at Waterfoot (County Antrim) in 1904, Bulmer Hobson (later of the IRB), the Nationalist MP Stephen Gwynn, and the Gaelic League activist Alice Milligan.

On the Irish interplay between religious factions and independence, Casement wrote to Bulmer Hobson in 1909: "The Irish Catholic, man for man, is a poor crawling coward as a rule. Afraid of his miserable soul and fearing the priest like the Devil". Freedom could come to Ireland ".. only through Irish Protestants, because they are not afraid of any Bogey".

Casement retired from the British consular service in the summer of 1913. In October he spoke at a Protestant assembly at Ballymoney Town Hall organised by Captain Jack White (who, in the midst of the Dublin lock-out, with James Connolly had begun organising a workers' militia, the Irish Citizen Army). On a platform with Ada McNeill, the historian Alice Stopford Green, and the veteran tenant-right activist J. B. Armour, he spoke to the motion disputing the claim of Edward Carson and his unionists "to represent the Protestant community of North East Ulster", and condemning the prospect of "lawless resistance" to Home Rule.

Enthused by the meeting, which had been covered by all the London and Irish papers, Casement resolved to replicate the Ballymoney meeting across Ulster, starting with Coleraine. But the Unionist-controlled council refused to allow the group access to the local Town Hall, and nothing came of it. Meanwhile, an anti-Home Rule meeting addressed by Carson's lieutenant Sir James Craig, then organising the Ulster Volunteers, not only filled the Ballymoney Town Hall but had the crowd spilling out into the surrounding streets. In the event, the Ballymoney Protestant "Protest Against the Lawless Policy of Carsonism" proved to be the only meeting of its kind held anywhere in Ulster.

Already in November 1913, Casement had begun focussing on responding to "Carsonism" in kind: he became a Gaelic League member of the Provisional Committee of the Irish Volunteers launched at a meeting in the Rotunda in Dublin. At the same time White and Connolly at the ITGWU formed the Irish Citizen Army. In April 1914, he had been together with Alice Milligan in Larne shortly after Craig had had German guns run through the port, a feat Casement told her nationalists would have to match.

=== America and Germany ===
In July 1914, Casement journeyed to the United States to promote and raise money for the Volunteers among the large and numerous Irish communities there. Through his friendship with men such as Bulmer Hobson, a member both of the Volunteers and of the secret Irish Republican Brotherhood (IRB), Casement established connections with exiled Irish nationalists, particularly Clan na Gael.

Elements of the suspicious Clan did not trust Casement completely, as he was not a member of the IRB and held views that they considered too moderate but others, such as John Quinn, regarded him as extreme. Devoy, initially hostile to Casement for his part in conceding control of the Irish Volunteers to John Redmond, was won over in June, and Joseph McGarrity, another Clan leader, became devoted to Casement and remained so from then on. The Howth gun-running in late July 1914, which Casement had helped to organise and (with a loan from Alice Stopford Green) finance, further enhanced his reputation.

In August 1914, at the outbreak of World War I, Casement and John Devoy arranged a meeting in New York with the western hemisphere's top-ranking German diplomat, Count Bernstorff, to propose a mutually beneficial plan: if Germany would sell guns to the Irish revolutionaries and provide military leaders, the Irish would revolt against England, diverting troops and attention from the war with Germany. Bernstorff appeared sympathetic. Casement and Devoy sent an envoy, Clan na Gael president John Kenny, to present their plan personally. Kenny, while unable to meet the German Emperor, did receive a warm reception from the German ambassador to Italy Hans von Flotow, and from Prince von Bülow.

In October 1914, Casement sailed from New York for Germany via Norway, travelling in disguise with a false passport and seeing himself as an ambassador of the Irish people. While the journey was his idea, Clan na Gael financed the expedition. Casement was carrying a large sum of money and sensitive documents. As a precaution he was accompanied by Adler Christensen, a young Norwegian immigrant returning to visit his family. The ship was boarded by the Royal Navy, detained and searched during which time Christensen concealed the money and documents entrusted to him. Casement was undetected. During their brief stop in Christiania, Adler Christensen, was taken to the British legation, where he was questioned about his travelling companion. He gave no information. Later he made a second visit this time on Casement's instructions and was informed that he would be rewarded if Casement were "knocked on the head". British diplomat Mansfeldt Findlay, sent a top secret memorandum to the Foreign Office alleging that Christensen had intimated a homosexual relationship with Casement. He continued to advise London that Christensen had, "implied that their relations were of an unnatural nature and that consequently he had great power over this man". On Casement's instructions, Christensen set about the entrapment of Findlay, which he finally achieved in December 1914 when Findlay handwrote the authorized bribe of £5,000 on official notepaper (equivalent to £606,100 in 2023), also guaranteeing immunity and free passage to the US in return for information leading to the capture of Roger Casement. Christensen returned to Berlin soon after with the original document which he delivered to a German official.

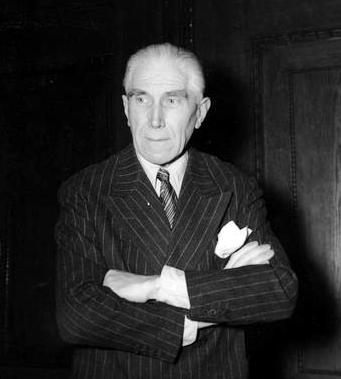
Franz von Papen. Papen was key in organising the arms shipments.

Findlay's handwritten letter of 1914 is kept in University College Dublin, and is viewable online.

In November 1914, Casement negotiated a declaration by Germany which stated:

The Imperial Government formally declares that under no circumstances would Germany invade Ireland with a view to its conquest or the overthrow of any native institutions in that country. Should the fortune of this Great War, which was not of Germany's seeking, ever bring in its course German troops to the shores of Ireland, they would land there not as an army of invaders to pillage and destroy but as the forces of a Government that is inspired by goodwill towards a country and people for whom Germany desires only national prosperity and national freedom.

Casement spent most of his time in Germany seeking to recruit an Irish Brigade from among more than 2,000 Irish prisoners-of-war taken in the early months of the war and held in the prison camp of Limburg an der Lahn. His plan was that they would be trained to fight against Britain in the cause of Irish independence. Fifty-two of the 2,000 prisoners volunteered for the Brigade. Contrary to German promises, they received no training in the use of machine guns, which at the time were relatively new and unfamiliar weapons. An anonymous but detailed account of Casement's unwelcoming reception at the camp appears in The Literary Digest. American Ambassador to Germany James W. Gerard mentioned the effort in his memoir "My Four Years in Germany":

The Germans collected all the soldier prisoners of Irish nationality in one camp at Limburg not far from Frankfurt a[m]. M[ain]. There efforts were made to induce them to join the German army. The men were well treated and were often visited by Sir Roger Casement who, working with the German authorities, tried to get these Irishmen to desert their flag and join the Germans. A few weaklings were persuaded by Sir Roger who finally discontinued his visits, after obtaining about thirty recruits, because the remaining Irishmen chased him out of the camp.

On 27 December 1914, Casement signed an agreement in Berlin with Arthur Zimmermann in the German Foreign Office, renouncing all his titles in a letter to the British Foreign Secretary dated 1 February 1915.

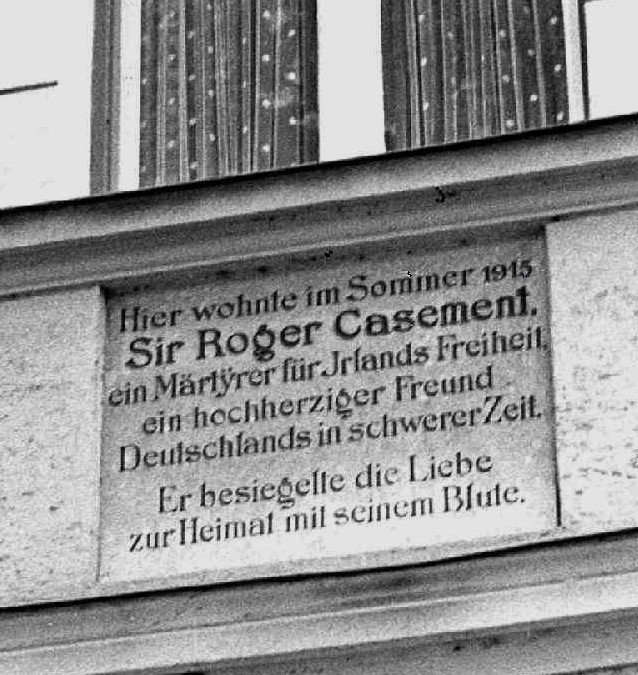
Plaque commemorating Casement's stay in Bavaria during the summer of 1915

During World War I, Casement is known to have been involved in the German-backed plan by Indians to win their freedom from the British Raj, the "Hindu–German Conspiracy", recommending Joseph McGarrity to Franz von Papen as an intermediary. The Indian nationalists may also have followed Casement's strategy of trying to recruit prisoners of war to fight for Indian independence.

Both efforts proved unsuccessful. In addition to finding it difficult to ally with the Germans while held as prisoners, potential recruits to Casement's brigade knew they would be liable to the death penalty as traitors if Britain won the war. In April 1916, Germany offered the Irish 20,000 Mosin–Nagant 1891 rifles, ten machine guns and accompanying ammunition, but no German officers; it was a fraction of the quantity of the arms Casement had hoped for, with no military expertise on offer. Estimates of the weapons shipment hover around the 20,000 mark. The BBC gives the figure the German government originally agreed to ship as "25,000 captured Russian rifles, and one million rounds of ammunition". The German weapons never reached Ireland. The British had intercepted German communications coming from Washington and suspected that there was going to be an attempt to land arms at Ireland, although they were not aware of the precise location. The ship transporting the arms—the German cargo vessel Libau, disguised as a Norwegian vessel, Aud-Norge, under Captain Karl Spindler—was apprehended by HMS Bluebell on the late afternoon of Good Friday. About to be escorted into Queenstown (present-day Cobh), County Cork, on the morning of 22 April, Captain Spindler scuttled the ship by pre-set explosive charges. All of the crew were German sailors, though their clothes and effects, plus charts and books, were Norwegian, and the surviving crew became prisoners of war.

As John Devoy had either misunderstood or disobeyed Pearse's instructions that the arms were under no circumstances to land before Easter Sunday, the Irish Transport and General Workers' Union (TGWU) members set to unload the arms under the command of Irish Citizen Army officer and trade unionist William Partridge were not ready. The IRB men sent to meet the boat drove off a pier and drowned.

=== Landing and capture ===
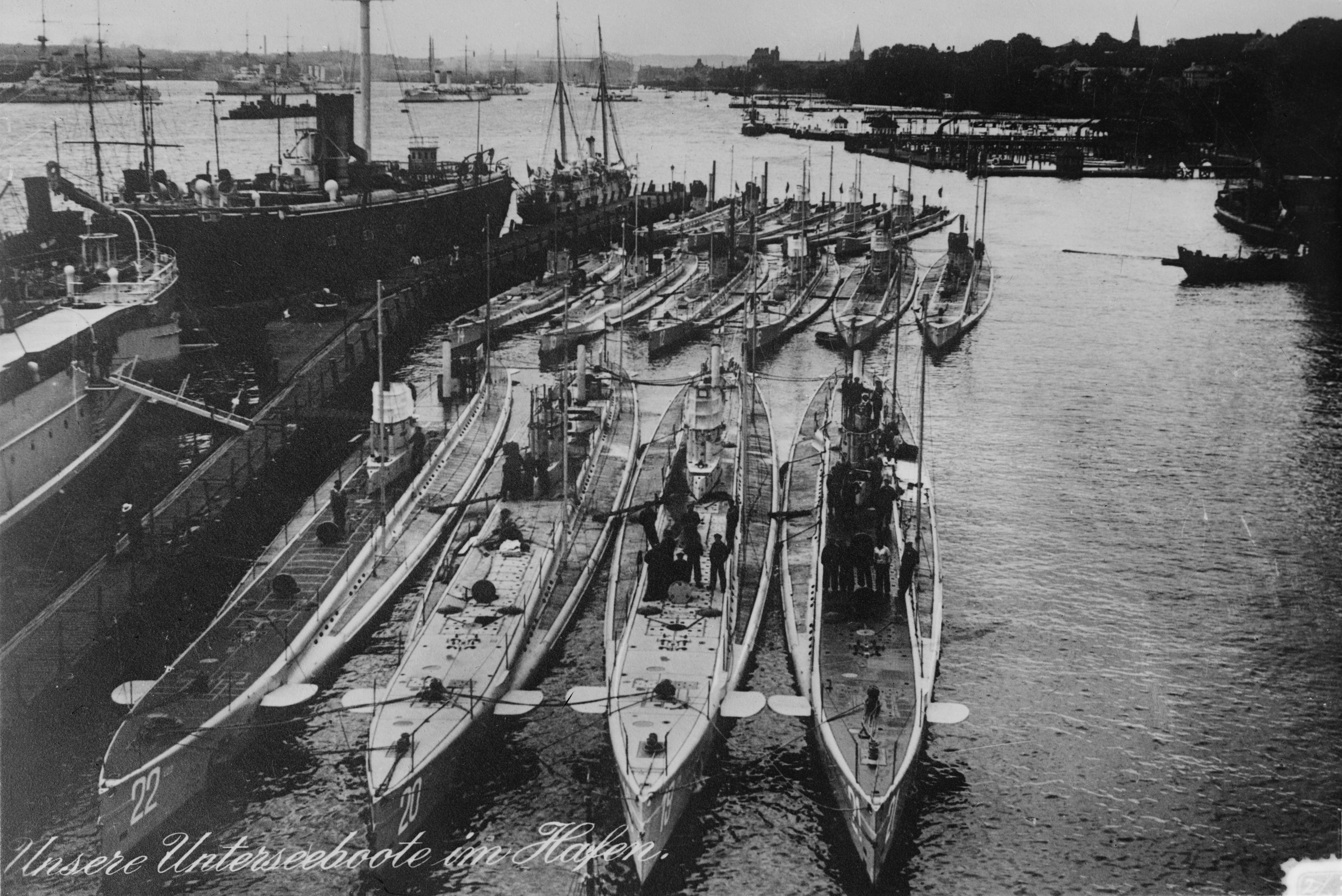
German U-boat SM U-19, second from the right. c. 1914

Casement confided his personal papers to Dr Charles Curry, with whom he had stayed at Riederau on the Ammersee, before he left Germany. He departed with Robert Monteith and Sergeant Daniel Beverley (Bailey) of the Irish Brigade in a submarine, initially SM U-20, which developed engine trouble, and then SM U-19, shortly after the Aud sailed. According to Monteith, Casement believed the Germans were toying with him from the start and providing inadequate aid that would doom a rising to failure.

Casement did not learn about the Easter Rising until after the plan had been fully developed. He wanted to reach Ireland before the shipment of arms and convince Eoin MacNeill (who he believed was still in control) to cancel the rising. Casement sent John McGoey, a recently arrived Irish-American, through Denmark to Dublin, ostensibly to advise what military aid was coming from Germany and when, but with Casement's orders "to get the Heads in Ireland to call off the rising and merely try to land the arms and distribute them". McGoey did not reach Dublin, nor did his message. His fate was unknown until recently. Evidently abandoning the Irish Nationalist cause, he joined the Royal Navy in 1916, survived the war, and later returned to the United States, where he died in an accident on a building site in 1925.

In the early hours of 21 April 1916, three days before the rising began, the German submarine put Casement and his two companions ashore at Banna Strand in Tralee Bay, County Kerry – the boat used is now in the Imperial War Museum in London. Suffering from a recurrence of the malaria that had plagued him since his days in the Congo, and too weak to keep up with Monteith and Bailey, Casement was discovered by a sergeant of the Royal Irish Constabulary at McKenna's Fort, an ancient ring fort in Rahoneen, Ardfert now known as Casement's Fort. When three pistols were discovered hidden nearby, the RIC arrested Casement on a charge of illegally bringing weapons into the country.

Casement was eventually to face charges of high treason, sabotage and espionage against the Crown. He sent word to Dublin about the inadequate German assistance. The Kerry Brigade of the Irish Volunteers might have tried to rescue him over the next three days, but its leadership in Dublin held that not a shot was to be fired in Ireland before the Easter Rising was in train and therefore ordered the Brigade to "do nothing" – a subsequent internal inquiry attached "no blame whatsoever" to the local Volunteers for failing to attempt a rescue. "He was taken to Brixton Prison to be placed under special observation for fear of an attempt at suicide. There were no staff at the Tower [of London] to guard suicidal cases." (Note: Sir Basil Thomson headed Scotland Yard's Criminal Investigation Division during WWI)

=== Trial and execution ===
Casement's trial at bar opened at the Royal Courts of Justice on 26 June 1916 before the Lord Chief Justice (Viscount Reading), Mr Justice Avory, and Mr Justice Horridge. The prosecution had trouble arguing its case. Casement's crimes had been carried out in Germany and the Treason Act 1351 seemed to apply only to activities carried out on English (or arguably British) soil. A close reading of the Act allowed for a broader interpretation: the court decided that a comma should be read into the unpunctuated original Norman-French text, crucially altering the sense so that "in the realm or elsewhere" referred to where acts were done and not just to where the "King's enemies" might be. Afterwards, Casement himself wrote that he was to be "hanged on a comma", leading to the well-used epigram.

During his trial, the prosecution (F. E. Smith), who had admired Casement's work while he was a British consul, informally suggested to the defence barrister (A. M. Sullivan) that they should jointly offer the typescripts produced by the Metropolitan Police in evidence; these were said to be official copies of Casement's secret diaries. The prosecution assumed that Sullivan hoped to save Casement's life with a verdict of "guilty but insane". However, Sullivan refused to agree and Casement was subsequently found guilty and sentenced to be hanged. Before, during and after the trial and appeal, British intelligence showed the police typescripts to the press and to influential persons. These portrayed Casement as a "sexual deviant" with numerous explicit accounts of homosexual activity. Scandalous rumours aroused public opinion against him and influenced those notables who might otherwise have tried to intervene. Given societal norms and the illegality of homosexuality at the time, support for Casement's reprieve declined in some quarters. The typescripts remained secret until published in 1959 as the Black Diaries. Bound diaries said to be the originals are kept in the British National Archives, whilst most of the other exhibits from the trial are in the Crime Museum in London.

Casement unsuccessfully appealed against his conviction and death sentence. Those who pleaded for clemency for Casement included Sir Arthur Conan Doyle, who was acquainted with Casement through the work of the Congo Reform Association, poet W. B. Yeats, and playwright George Bernard Shaw. Joseph Conrad could not forgive Casement, nor could Casement's long-time friend, the sculptor Herbert Ward, whose son Charles had been killed on the Western Front that January, and who would change the name of Casement's godson, who had been named after him. Members of the Casement family in Antrim contributed discreetly to the defence fund, although they had sons in the British Army and Navy. A United States Senate appeal against the death sentence was rejected by the British cabinet on the insistence of prosecutor F. E. Smith, an opponent of Irish independence.

Casement's knighthood was forfeited on 29 June 1916. On the day of his execution by hanging at Pentonville Prison, 3 August 1916, Casement was received back into the Catholic Church at his request. He was attended by two Catholic priests, Dean Timothy Ring and Father James Carey, from the East London parish of SS Mary and Michael. The latter, also known as James McCarroll, said of Casement that he was "a saint ... we should be praying to him [Casement] instead of for him". At the time of his death he was 51 years old.

=== State funeral ===
Casement's body was buried in quicklime in the prison cemetery at the rear of Pentonville Prison, where he had been hanged, though his last wish was to be buried at Murlough Bay on the north coast of County Antrim, in present-day Northern Ireland. During the decades after his execution, successive British governments refused many formal requests for repatriation of Casement's remains. For example, in September 1953, Taoiseach Éamon de Valera, on a visit to Prime Minister Winston Churchill in Downing Street, requested the return of the remains. Churchill said he was not personally opposed to the idea but would consult with his colleagues and take legal advice. He ultimately turned down the Irish request, citing "specific and binding" legal obligations that the remains of executed prisoners could not be exhumed. De Valera disputed the legal advice and responded:

So long as Roger Casement's remains remain within British prison walls, when he himself expressed the wish that it should be transferred to his native land, so long there will be public resentment here at what must appear to be, at least, the unseemly obduracy of the British Government.

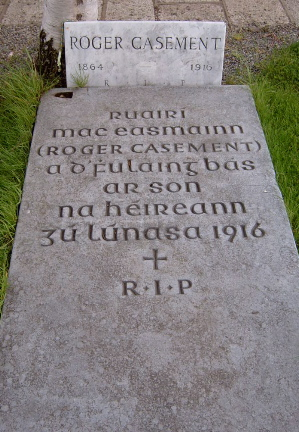
Roger Casement's grave in Glasnevin Cemetery. The capstone reads "Roger Casement, who died for the sake of Ireland, 3rd August 1916".

De Valera received no reply. Finally, in 1965, Casement's remains were repatriated to Ireland. Despite the annulment, or withdrawal, of his knighthood in 1916, the 1965 UK Cabinet record of the repatriation decision refers to him as "Sir Roger Casement". Contrary to Casement's wishes, Prime Minister Harold Wilson's government had released the remains only on condition that they could not be brought into Northern Ireland, as "the government feared that a reburial there could provoke Catholic celebrations and Protestant reactions."

Casement's remains lay in state at the Church of the Sacred Heart (near Arbour Hill Prison) in Dublin city for five days, close to the graves of other leaders of the 1916 Easter Rising, but would not be buried beside them. After a state funeral, the remains were buried with full military honours in the Republican plot in Glasnevin Cemetery in Dublin, alongside other Irish republicans and nationalists. The 82-year-old de Valera, who was then the President of Ireland and the last surviving leader of the Easter Rising, attended the ceremony, along with an estimated 30,000 others.

Founded in 2013, the Roger Casement Commemoration and Re-interment Association (RCC&RA) organised for the re-interment of Casement in accordance with his last wish. In October 2026, the association submitted an application to Dublin City Council and Glasnevin Cemetery for his exhumation and a licence to move Casement's remains to Murlough Bay, County Antrim.

== The Black Diaries ==
British officials have claimed that Casement kept the Black Diaries, a set of diaries covering the years 1903, 1910 and 1911 (twice). Jeffrey Dudgeon, who published an edition of all the diaries said, "His homosexual life was almost entirely out of sight and disconnected from his career and political work." If genuine, the diaries reveal Casement was a homosexual who had many partners, had a fondness for young men and mostly paid for sex.

In 1916, before Casement's conviction for high treason, British intelligence showed police typescripts (alleged copies of Casement's diaries allegedly in police possession) to influential individuals in a campaign to destroy his reputation and to undermine sympathy for him. At a time of strong conservatism, not least among Irish Catholics, publicising the typescripts and Casement's alleged homosexuality undermined support for him. The question of whether the diaries are genuine or forgeries has been much disputed. The diaries were declassified for limited inspection (by persons approved by the Home Office) in August 1959. The manuscript diaries which were not shown in 1916 may today be seen at the British National Archives in Kew. Historians and biographers of Casement's life have taken opposing views. Roger McHugh (in 1976) and Angus Mitchell (since the 1990s) regard the diaries as forged.

In 1997, The Lilliput Press in Dublin, published The Amazon Journal of Roger Casement, edited by Angus Mitchell. In addition to other correspondence, it reproduces Casement's "Putomayo Journal" covering the period between 23 September and 6 December 1910. Having been submitted to a parliamentary Select Committee in Westminster, the journal had in the public domain but, according to Mitchell, "had been almost entirely overlooked". Apart from various stylistic and narrative discrepancies (the journal gives a darker, more vivid account of the slavery Casement observed in the Amazonian region) there is the question of why Casement would have "kept two diaries for the same period, each containing information about the same events". Mitchell revised his earlier acceptance of the Black Diaries. He regards the existence of the Putamayo Journal is a fatal flaw in the case for their authenticity.

In 2019 Paul R. Hyde published Anatomy of a lie: Decoding Casement, a controversial investigation of the diaries which cited much official evidence and concluded that the bound diaries were forged after Casement's death. Hyde's central argument is that there is no independent witness evidence that the manuscript diaries physically existed in 1916. This argument has two sources; none of the studies and biographies pleading authenticity cite any names of independent persons who saw manuscript diaries in 1916; official UK government files also fail to cite such names but do verify that many named persons were shown the police typescripts.

=== The Giles Report ===
A private investigation of the Black Diaries was commissioned by Professor William J. McCormack of Goldsmiths College, jointly funded by the BBC and RTÉ, and carried out by Dr. Audrey Giles. The results of this handwriting investigation were announced by McCormack at a London press conference on March 12, 2002. He stated that the diaries were authentic "without any reason to suspect either forgery or interpolation by any other hand".

Two US document examiners independently reviewed the Giles Report; both were critical of it. James Horan stated, "As editor of the Journal of Forensic Sciences and The Journal of the American Society of Questioned Document Examiners, I would NOT recommend publication of the Giles Report because the report does not show HOW its conclusion was reached." and "To the question, 'Is the writing Roger Casement's?' on the basis of the Giles Report as it stands, my answer would have to be I cannot tell." Document examiner Marcel Matley wrote, "Even if every document examined were the authentic writing of Casement, this report does nothing to establish the fact".

An appraisal of the Giles Report for History Ireland argues that investigation "cannot claim scientific validity" because from the outset it was seeking verification not falsification. The examiners were not "looking for weaknesses, contradictions, anomalies" as should axiomatic for forensic review of the evidence.

=== Vargas Llosa and Dudgeon ===
Mario Vargas Llosa presented a mixed account of Casement's sexuality in his 2010 novel, The Dream of the Celt, suggesting that Casement wrote partially fictional diaries of what he wished had taken place in homosexual encounters. Dudgeon proclaimed in a 2013 article that Casement needed to be "sexless" to fit his role as a Catholic martyr in the nationalist movement of the time. Dudgeon writes, "The evidence that Casement was a busy homosexual is in his own words and handwriting in the diaries, and is colossally convincing because of its detail and extent."

== Legacy ==
=== Landmarks, buildings, and organisations ===
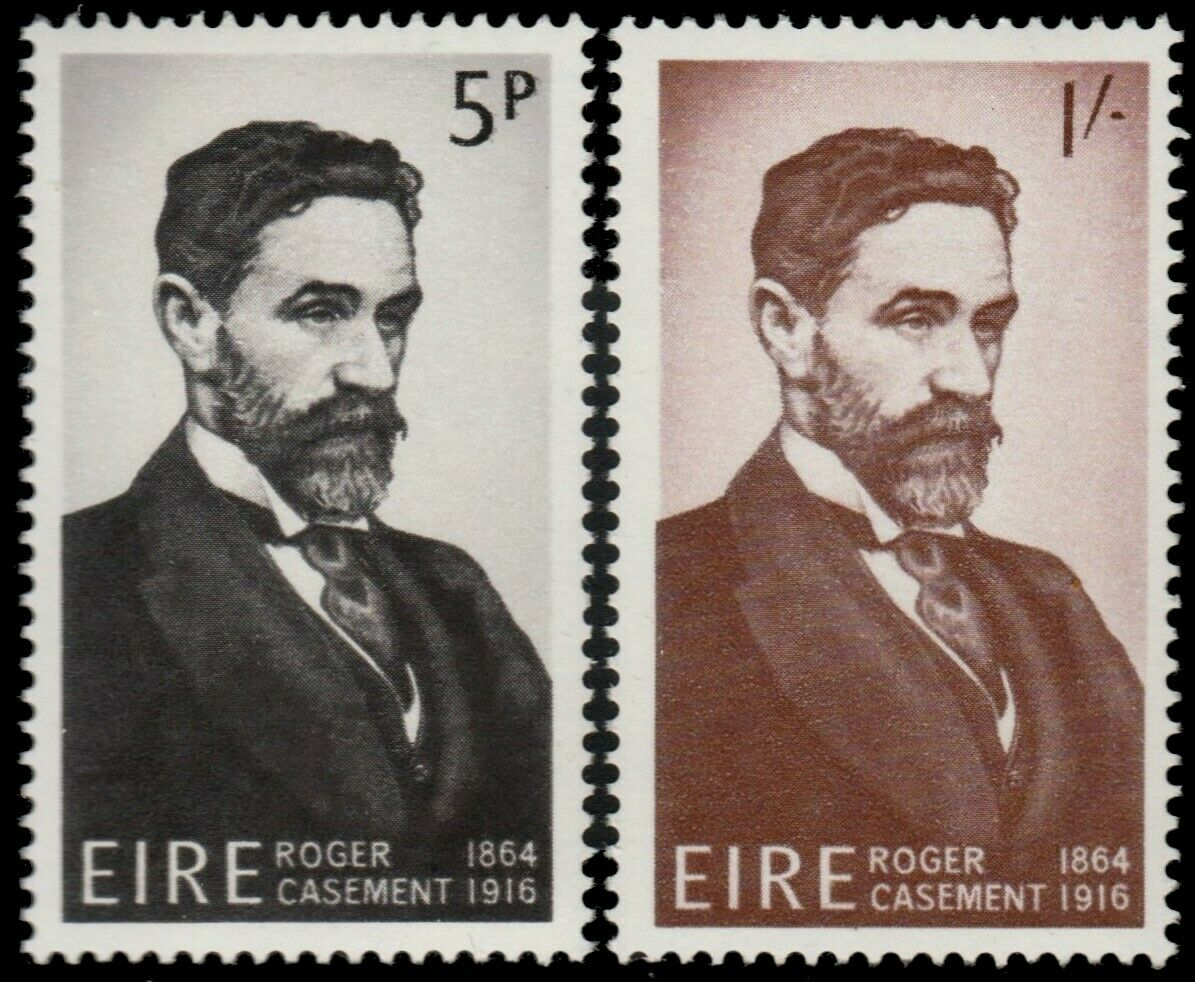
1966 Ireland stamps commemorating the 50th anniversary of Casement's death

- Casement Park, the Gaelic Athletic Association ground on Andersonstown Road in west Belfast.
- Several Gaelic Athletic Association clubs, for instance Roger Casements GAA Club (Coventry, England), Roger Casements GFC (Toronto, Canada), and Roger Casements GAC (Portglenone, Northern Ireland)
- Gaelscoil Mhic Easmainn (Irish for Casement), an Irish-speaking national school in Tralee, County Kerry
- Casement Heights, an estate named after him in Árd Easmuinn, Dundalk
- Casement Aerodrome, the Irish Air Corps base in Baldonnel
- Tralee Casement railway station, near the site of Casement's landing on Banna Strand
- Roger Casement Park, an estate in the Cork suburb of Glasheen
- Roger Casement Street and its adjacent estate, in Clonakilty
- A monument at Banna Strand, open to the public at all times
- A statue in Ballyheigue, County Kerry
- A statue at Dún Laoghaire Baths
- Casement Road, Park, Drive and Grove in Finglas, County Dublin.

=== Representation in culture ===
Casement has been the subject of ballads, poetry, novels, and TV series since his death, including:

- The ballad "Lonely Banna Strand" tells the story of Casement's role in the prelude to the Easter Rising, his arrest, and his execution.
- Arthur Conan Doyle used Casement as an inspiration for the character of Lord John Roxton in the 1912 novel, The Lost World.
- W. B. Yeats wrote a poem, The Ghost of Roger Casement, demanding the return of Casement's remains, with the refrain, "The ghost of Roger Casement/Is beating on the door"
- Roger Casement is featured in La Chaussée des Géants (1922) by Pierre Benoit.
- Agatha Christie refers to Casement and the 1916 Uprising in her 1941 novel N or M?
- Brendan Behan, in his autobiographical novel Borstal Boy (1958), speaks of the respect his family had for Casement.
- In 1960, "Sir Roger Casement" was the first episode of Granada Television's On Trial series, produced by Peter Wildeblood. Casement was played by Peter Wyngarde
- Casement is the subject of the play Prisoner of the Crown, which was written by Richard Herd and Richard Stockton; it premiered at the Abbey Theatre in Dublin on 15 February 1972
- A German TV series, Sir Roger Casement (1968), was made about his time in Germany during World War I.
- In 1973, BBC Radio aired a radio play by David Rudkin entitled Cries from Casement as His Bones Are Brought to Dublin
- The Dream of the Celt by Mario Vargas Llosa is a historical novel based on Roger Casement's life, translated from the Spanish by Edith Grossman in 2012.
- American noise rock band ...And You Will Know Us by the Trail of Dead released an instrumental entitled "The Betrayal of Roger Casement & the Irish Brigade" on their 2008 Festival Thyme EP
- Dying for Ireland (2012) is a biographical novel by Alan Lewis, which presents a fictional reimagining of Casement's prison memoirs, based on his writings, histories and biographies.
- A one-act play, Shall Roger Casement Hang?, based mainly on his interrogation at Scotland Yard, was performed for the first time at the Tron Theatre in Glasgow in May 2016.
- The Trial of Roger Casement is a graphic novel by Fionnuala Doran
- Roger Casement is discussed in W. G. Sebald's novel The Rings of Saturn.
- Valiant Gentlemen is a historical novel based on Casement's friendship with Herbert Ward and his wife Sarita Sanford, by Sabina Murray, Grove/Atlantic, 2016.
- Roger Casement – Heart of Darkness (1992) is a documentary by Kenneth Griffith on the life of Roger Casement. The name refers to Joseph Conrad's novel of that name, written after Conrad met Casement in Congo.
- The Ghost of Roger Casement (2002) is a documentary that investigates the authenticity of the forensic examination of the Black Diaries.
- The Newly Discovered Paintings of Roger Casement, Volume 1 (2016) is an exhibition of Paintings and Drawings attributed to Casement, and a pseudo academic press release by Irish conceptual artist Stephen Hall first exhibited at The Cul De Sac Gallery in London, UK.

== Bibliography ==
=== By Roger Casement ===
- 1910. Roger Casement's Diaries: 1910. The Black and the White. Sawyer, Roger, ed. London: Pimlico. ISBN 0-7126-7375-X
- 1910. The Amazon Journal of Roger Casement. Mitchell, Angus, ed. Anaconda Editions.
- *Casement, Roger (2003). Mitchell, Angus (ed.). Sir Roger Casement's Heart of Darkness: The 1911 Documents. Irish Manuscripts Commission. ISBN 978-1-874280-98-9.
- 1914. The Crime against Ireland, and How the War May Right it. Berlin: no publisher.
- 1914. Ireland, Germany and Freedom of the Seas: A Possible Outcome of the War of 1914. New York & Philadelphia: The Irish Press Bureau. Reprinted 2005: ISBN 1-4219-4433-2
- 1914–16 'One Bold Deed of Open Treason: The Berlin Diary of Roger Casement', Mitchell, Angus ed., Merrion
- 1915. The Crime against Europe. The Causes of the War and the Foundations of Peace. Berlin: The Continental Times.
- 1916. Gesammelte Schriften. Irland, Deutschland und die Freiheit der Meere und andere Aufsätze. Diessen vor München: Joseph Huber Verlag. 2nd expanded edition, 1917.
- 1918. Some Poems. London: The Talbot Press/T. Fisher Unwin.
- Slavery in Peru: Message from the President of the United States Transmitting Report of the Secretary of State, with Accompanying Papers, Concerning the Alleged Existence of Slavery in Peru. United States. Department of State. 1913.

=== Secondary Literature, and other materials cited in this entry ===
- Carroll, Rory (2026). A Rebel and a Traitor: A Fugitive, the Manhunt and the Birth of the IRA. HarperCollins. ISBN 978-0008696955.
- Clayton, Xander: Aud, Plymouth 2007.
- Daly, Mary E., ed. 2005. Roger Casement in Irish and World History, Dublin, Royal Irish Academy
- Doerries, Reinhard R., 2000. Prelude to the Easter Rising: Sir Roger Casement in Imperial Germany. London & Portland. Frank Cass.
- Dudgeon, Jeffrey, 2002. Roger Casement: The Black Diaries with a Study of his Background, Sexuality and Irish Political Life. Belfast Press (includes first publication of 1911 diary); 2nd paperback and Kindle editions, 2016; 3rd paperback and Kindle editions, 2019, ISBN 978-1-9160194-0-9.
- Dudgeon, Jeffrey, July 2016. Roger Casement's German Diary 1914–1916 including 'A Last Page' and associated correspondence. Belfast Press, ISBN 978-0-9539287-5-0.
- Eberspächer, Cord/Wiechmann, Gerhard. "Erfolg Revolution kann Krieg entscheiden". Der Einsatz von S.M.H. Libau im irischen Osteraufstand 1916 ("Success revolution may decide war". The use of S.M.H. Libau in the Easter Rising 1916), in: Schiff & Zeit, Nr. 67, Frühjahr 2008, S 2–16.
- Goodman, Jordan, The Devil and Mr. Casement: One Man's Battle for Human Rights in South America's Heart of Darkness, 2010. Farrar, Straus & Giroux; ISBN 978-0-374-13840-0
- Hardenburg, Walter (1912). The Putumayo, the Devil's Paradise; Travels in the Peruvian Amazon Region and an Account of the Atrocities Committed Upon the Indians Therein. London: Fischer Unwin.
- Harris, Brian, "Injustice", Sutton Publishing. 2006; ISBN 0-7509-4021-2
- Hochschild, Adam, King Leopold's Ghost.
- Hyde, H. Montgomery, 1960. Trial of Roger Casement. London: William Hodge. Penguin edition 1964.
- Hyde, H. Montgomery, 1970. The Love That Dared not Speak its Name. Boston: Little, Brown (in UK The Other Love).
- Inglis, Brian, 1973. Roger Casement, London: Hodder and Stoughton. Republished 1993 by Blackstaff Belfast and by Penguin 2002; ISBN 0-14-139127-8.
- Lacey, Brian, 2008. Terrible Queer Creatures: Homosexuality in Irish History. Dublin: Wordwell Books.
- MacColl, René, 1956. Roger Casement. London, Hamish Hamilton.
- Mc Cormack, W. J., 2002. Roger Casement in Death or Haunting the Free State. Dublin: UCD Press.
- Minta, Stephen, 1993. Aguirre: The Re-creation of a Sixteenth-Century Journey Across South America. Henry Holt & Co. ISBN 0-8050-3103-0.
- Mitchell, Angus, 2003. Casement (Life & Times Series). Haus Publishing Limited; ISBN 1-904341-41-1.
- Mitchell, Angus, 2013. Roger Casement. Dublin: O'Brien Press; ISBN 978-1-84717-608-0.
- Mitchell, Angus, 2026. Casement (Life & Times). Haus Publishing Limited.
- Ó Síocháin, Séamas and Michael O’Sullivan, eds., 2004. The Eyes of Another Race: Roger Casement's Congo Report and 1903 Diary. University College Dublin Press; ISBN 1-900621-99-1.
- Ó Síocháin, Séamas, 2008. Roger Casement: Imperialist, Rebel, Revolutionary. Dublin: Lilliput Press.
- Reid, B.L., 1987. The Lives of Roger Casement. London: The Yale Press; ISBN 0-300-01801-0.
- Sawyer, Roger, 1984. Casement: The Flawed Hero. London: Routledge & Kegan Paul.
- Singleton-Gates, Peter, & Maurice Girodias, 1959. The Black Diaries. An Account of Roger Casement's Life and Times with a Collection of His Diaries and Public Writings. Paris: The Olympia Press. First edition of the Black Diaries.
- Thomson, Basil, 1922. Queer People (chapters 7–8), an account of the Easter Uprising and Casement's involvement from the head of Scotland Yard at the time. London: Hodder and Stoughton.
- Wolf, Karin, 1972. Sir Roger Casement und die deutsch-irischen Beziehungen. Berlin: Duncker & Humblot; ISBN 3-428-02709-4.
